= Litobrenthia =

Scientific classification
- Domain: Eukaryota
- Kingdom: Animalia
- Phylum: Arthropoda
- Class: Insecta
- Order: Lepidoptera
- Family: Choreutidae
- Genus: Litobrenthia; Diakonoff, 1978

Genus of moths

Litobrenthia is a genus of moths in the family Choreutidae.

== Species ==
- Litobrenthia angustipunctata Budashkin & Li, 2009
- Litobrenthia grammodes Diakonoff, 1979
- Litobrenthia japonica (Issiki, 1930)
- Litobrenthia luminifera (Meyrick, 1912)
- Litobrenthia stephanephora Diakonoff, 1979
- Litobrenthia tetartodipla (Diakonoff, 1978)

== Former species ==
- Litobrenthia carola (Meyrick, 1912)
- Litobrenthia coronigera (Meyrick, 1918)
- Litobrenthia cyanaula (Meyrick, 1912)
- Litobrenthia leptocosma (Meyrick, 1916)
