= P. crocea =

P. crocea may refer to:

- Palicourea crocea, a flowering plant
- Papillaria crocea, an Australian moss
- Parathelphusa crocea, a freshwater crab
- Peristernia crocea, a sea snail
- Phiale crocea, a jumping spider
- Pleurothallis crocea, a flowering plant
- Potentilla crocea, a flowering plant
- Pseudanarta crocea, a North American moth
- Pseudosciaena crocea, a croaker native to the western Pacific
- Pterocera crocea, a sea snail
- Pyrrocoma crocea, a perennial plant
