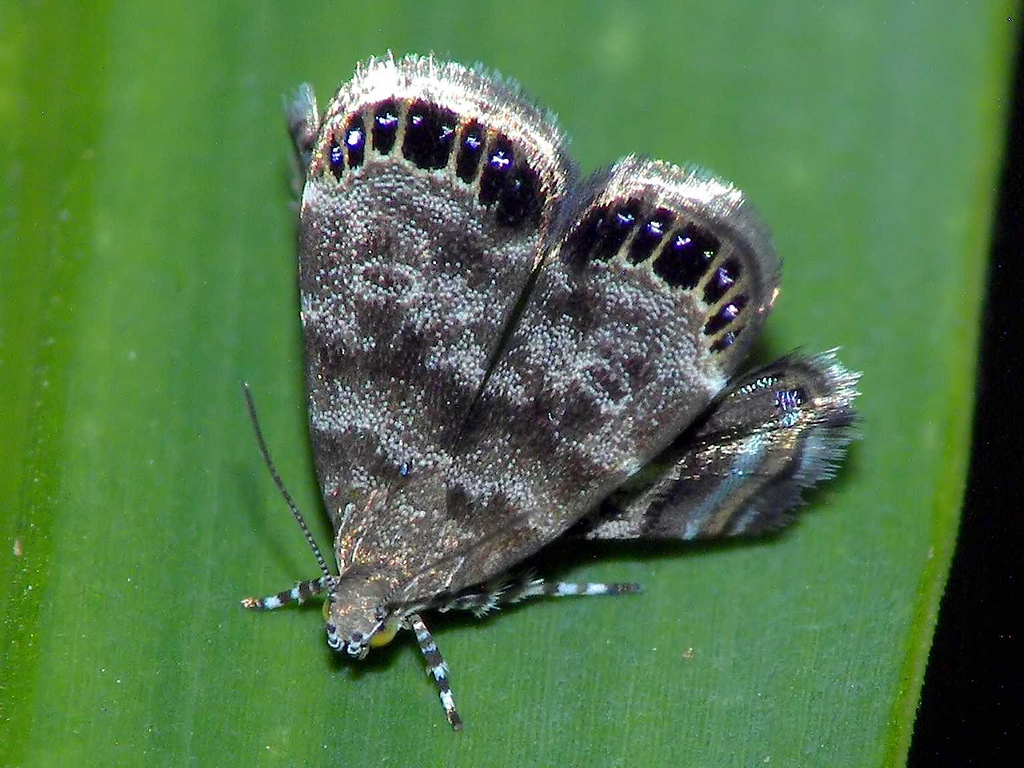
- Unidentified species of Brenthia

Scientific classification
- Kingdom: Animalia
- Phylum: Arthropoda
- Clade: Pancrustacea
- Class: Insecta
- Order: Lepidoptera
- Family: Choreutidae
- Subfamily: Brenthiinae
- Genus: Brenthia; Clemens, 1860

Synonyms
- Microaethia Chambers, 1878

= Brenthia =

Genus of moths

Brenthia is a genus of moths in the family Choreutidae.

== Species ==
- Brenthia acmogramma Meyrick, 1915 (from Bolivia)
- Brenthia albimaculana (Snellen, 1875)
- Brenthia anisopa Diakonoff, 1968
- Brenthia ardens Meyrick, 1912 (from Assam, India)
- Brenthia buthusalis (Walker, 1863)
- Brenthia caelicola Meyrick, 1910
- Brenthia carola Meyrick, 1912 (from Assam, India)
- Brenthia catenata Meyrick, 1907 (from Poona, India)
- Brenthia ceutholychna Meyrick, 1915 (from British Guyana/Peru)
- Brenthia chrysosperma Meyrick, 1931 (from Brazil, Tefé)
- Brenthia confluxana (Walker, 1863) (from Amazonas, Cuba, Jamaica, W.Indies)
- Brenthia coronigera Meyrick, 1918 (from Bengal)
- Brenthia cubana Heppner, 1985
- Brenthia cyanastra Meyrick, 1909 (from Bolivia, Songo)
- Brenthia cyanaula Meyrick, 1912 (From India, Bengal & Calcutta)
- Brenthia dendronympha Meyrick, 1937 (from India)
- Brenthia dicentrota Meyrick, 1930 (from Uganda)
- Brenthia diplotaphra Meyrick, 1938 (from Papua, Kokoda)
- Brenthia elachista Walsingham, 1900
- Brenthia elongata Heppner, 1985 (Puerto Rico, Virgin islands)
- Brenthia entoma Diakonoff, 1982
- Brenthia episotras Meyrick, 1920 (from Brazil, Obidos)
- Brenthia eriopis Meyrick, 1920 (from Brazil, Obidos)
- Brenthia excusana (Walker, 1863)
- Brenthia formosensis Issiki, 1930
- Brenthia gamicopis Meyrick, 1930 (from Uganda)
- Brenthia gregori Heppner, 1985 (from Cuba & Virgin islands)
- Brenthia harmonica Meyrick, 1918 (from the Philppines)
- Brenthia heptacosma Meyrick, 1920 (from Brazil, Para)
- Brenthia hexaselena Meyrick, 1909 (from Bolivia, Songo)
- Brenthia hibiscusae Heppner, 1985 (Cuba and Puerto Rico; Venezuela)
- Brenthia leptocosma Meyrick, 1916 (from Mauritius/Réunion)
- Brenthia leucatoma Meyrick, 1918
- Brenthia logistics Meyrick, 1909 (from Bolivia, Songo)
- Brenthia luminifera Meyrick, 1912 (from Assam, India)
- Brenthia malachitis Meyrick, 1909 (from Bolivia, Songo)
- Brenthia melodica Meyrick, 1922 (from Fiji)
- Brenthia monolychna Meyrick, 1915 (British Guiana, Bartica)
- Brenthia moriutii Arita, 1987
- Brenthia nephelosema Diakonoff, 1978
- Brenthia ochripalpis Meyrick, 1920 (from Brazil, Rio Trombetas)
- Brenthia octogemmifera Walsingham, 1897
- Brenthia ocularis (Felder & Rogenhofer, 1875)
- Brenthia paranympha Meyrick, 1912 (from Assam, India)
- Brenthia pavonacella Clemens, 1860
- Brenthia pileae Arita, 1971
- Brenthia pleiadopa Meyrick, 1921
- Brenthia quadriforella Zeller, 1877
- Brenthia salaconia Meyrick, 1910
- Brenthia salinata Meyrick, 1918 (from India)
- Brenthia sapindella Busck, 1934 (from Cuba)
- Brenthia spintheristis Meyrick, 1910
- Brenthia stenorma Meyrick, 1915 (from Parana, Brazil)
- Brenthia stimulans Meyrick, 1920 (from Brazil: Para, Obidos & Santarém)
- Brenthia strophalora Meyrick, 1912 (from India)
- Brenthia stylophora Meyrick, 1920 (from Brazil, Obidos)
- Brenthia thoracosema Diakonoff, 1982
- Brenthia trilampas Meyrick, 1918 (from the Philippines)
- Brenthia trilitha Meyrick, 1907
- Brenthia trimachaera Meyrick, 1927
- Brenthia virginalis Meyrick, 1912
- Brenthia yaeyamae Arita, 1971
