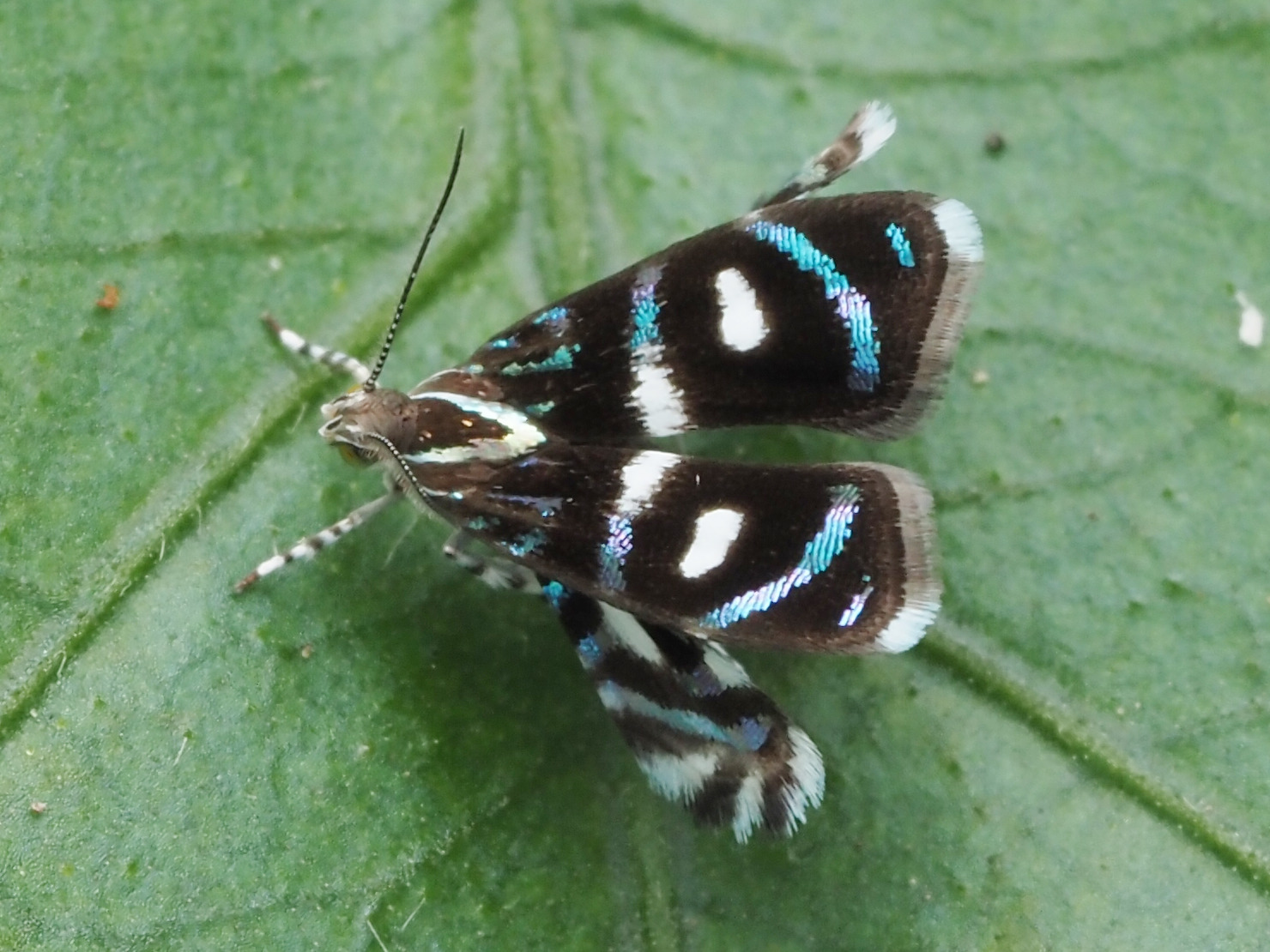
- Video showing Brenthia hexaselena mimicking its predator, a jumping spider in posture, coloration and movement

Scientific classification
- Kingdom: Animalia
- Phylum: Arthropoda
- Class: Insecta
- Order: Lepidoptera
- Family: Choreutidae
- Genus: Brenthia
- Species: B. hexaselena

Binomial name
- Brenthia hexaselena Meyrick, 1909

Synonyms
- Brenthia bicaudella Walsingham, 1914

= Brenthia hexaselena =

Species of moth

Brenthia hexaselena is a species of moth of the family Choreutidae. It is found in Costa Rica. It is a rare example of a prey animal mimicking its predator.

== Mimicry ==
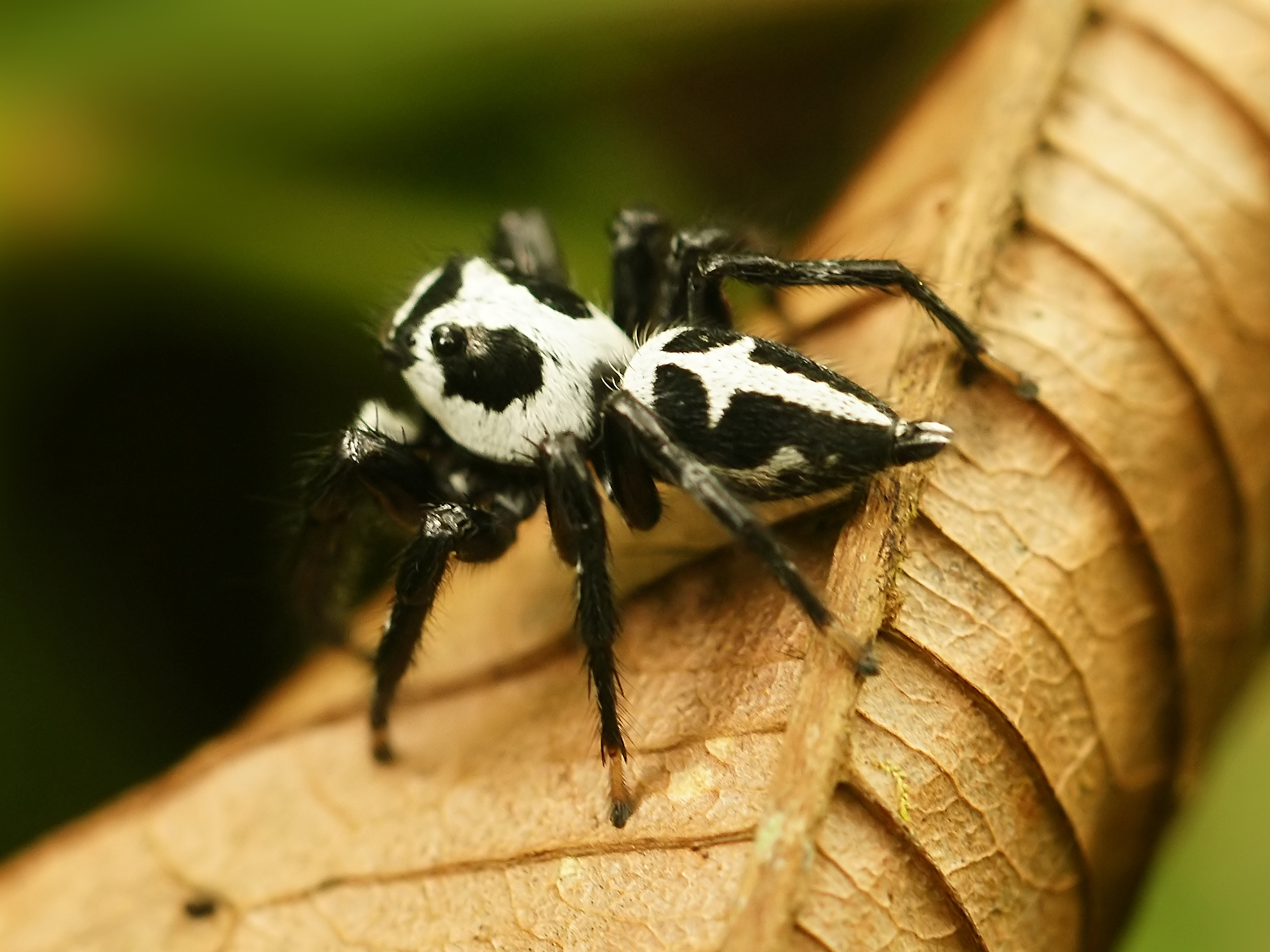
The jumping spider Phiale formosa, a predator of the Brenthia moth, is unusually mimicked by the moth

Adults mimic their predators.
