= Brenthia ardens =

Scientific classification
- Kingdom: Animalia
- Phylum: Arthropoda
- Class: Insecta
- Order: Lepidoptera
- Family: Choreutidae
- Genus: Brenthia
- Species: B. ardens

Binomial name
- Brenthia ardens Meyrick, 1912

Species of moth

Brenthia ardens is a species of moth of the family Choreutidae. It was described by Edward Meyrick in 1912. It is found in Assam, India.
