= Brenthia entoma =

Scientific classification
- Domain: Eukaryota
- Kingdom: Animalia
- Phylum: Arthropoda
- Class: Insecta
- Order: Lepidoptera
- Family: Choreutidae
- Genus: Brenthia
- Species: B. entoma

Binomial name
- Brenthia entoma Diakonoff, 1982

Species of moth

Brenthia entoma is a species of moth of the family Choreutidae. It was described by Alexey Diakonoff in 1982. It is found in Sri Lanka.

== Description ==
The wingspan of the adult male is 8 mm. The head and thorax are glossy fuscous. Palpus moderately long and gray fuscous. Antenna black. Abdomen fuscous bronze with a black anal tuft. Forewings dark fuscous bronze. Costa with a fuscous-black suffusion. A white patch found at one-third of the costa and a small wedge-shaped white mark found at four-fifths of the costa. A wedge-shaped mark is continued across the wings towards the dorsum by a slender white line. One metallic-violet dot and two violet dots are found on the forewings. Cilia fuscous. Hindwing dark fuscous bronze. Cilia dark fuscous.
