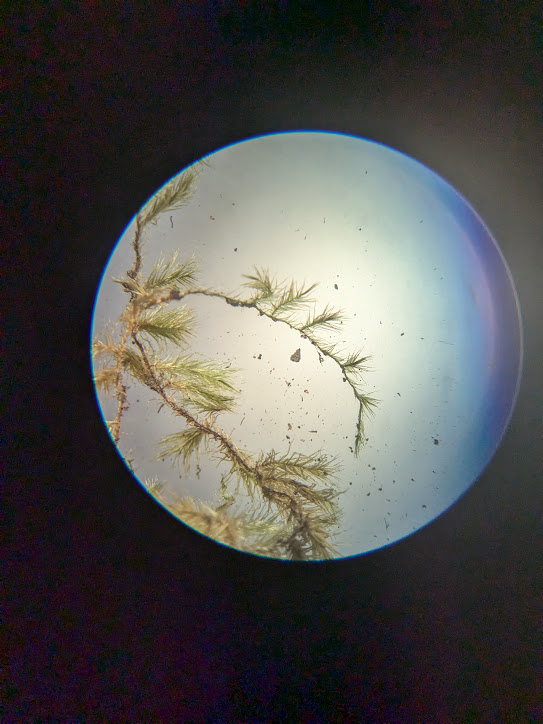
- The macroscopic habit of Lepyrodontopsis trichophylla as seen under a dissecting microscope

Scientific classification
- Kingdom: Plantae
- Division: Bryophyta
- Class: Bryopsida
- Subclass: Bryidae
- Order: Hypnales
- Family: Meteoriaceae (?)
- Genus: Lepyrodontopsis; Broth.
- Species: L. trichophylla

Binomial name
- Lepyrodontopsis trichophylla (Sw. ex Hedw.) Broth.

= Lepyrodontopsis =

Monospecific genus of hypnalean mosses

Lepyrodontopsis is a monospecific genus of disputed taxonomy. It has been variously placed in Meteoriaceae and Brachytheciaceae, which are regarded as sister families.

The only accepted species within Lepyrodontopsis is Lepyrodontopsis trichophylla. One invalid species was described and placed within Lepyrodontopsis, but the description gives no type specimen and lacks a Latin diagnosis.

== Etymology ==
The generic name is derived from Lepyrodon, another genus of mosses which Lepyrodontopsis is morphologically similar to, and -opsis, meaning "resembles."

== Morphology ==
Lepyrodontopsis trichophylla is a pleurocarp of moderate size with a complanate habit. Its leaves have linear cells characteristic of Hypnales and lack cellular ornamentation. It lacks a costa and has serrate to serrulate margins. The major diagnostic characteristic of Lepyrodontopsis is longitudinal furrows, particularly obvious when the leaves are dry. Its exostome resembles that of several families once included in Neckeraceae.

== Distribution ==
Lepyrodontopsis is limited to the Neotropics. It has been recorded in the Tropical Andes, the Dominican Republic, the elfin woodland of Jamaica and Puerto Rico, Montserrat, and other West Indian islands. In moist environments of the West Indies, it is both widespread and frequently dominant among epiphytic communities, but its range outside of the Antilles is limited.

=== Habit ===
Lepyrodontopsis grows in moist forests between 350 and 2000 meters of elevation, typically epiphytically, though occasionally also on rocks.

== Disputed taxonomy ==
At the time that it was described in 1924, Lepyrodontopsis was placed within Brachytheciaceae. In Pleurocarpous Mosses of the West Indies, W. R. Buck placed it in Meteoriaceae, despite in 1981 proposing a new family—Lepyrodontopsidaceae—because Lepyrodontopsis is phylogenetically isolated due to its strange morphology. It is abnormal among the ecostate hypnoids due to its deeply plicate leaves. Nor does it fit within the costate hypnoids, as it lacks that characteristic structure. Phylogenetically, Buck placed it near Meteoriaceae, and in 1986, he placed Lepyrodontopsidaceae in the proposed super-family of Meteoriacanae. Following Buck's lead, Guide to the Bryophytes of Tropical America likewise places Lepyrodontopsis in Meteoriaceae, though it remarks on the need for further phylogenetic research to understand its placement within the order. In 2010, Bruce H. Allen placed Lepyrodontopsis within Lembophyllaceae on the basis of both morphology and molecular analyses published in 2004, which determined that Lepyrodontopsis was basal to the Lembophyllaceae-Neckeraceae clade.

=== Phylogeny ===
A molecular analysis of chloroplast DNA (cpDNA) and nuclear ribosomal transcription unit (nrDNA) published in 2004 resolved three major families within the hypnoid mosses: Meteoriaceae, Lembophyllaceae, and Brachytheciaceae, all of which were found to be more or less monophyletic. Among the phylogeny produced by this paper, Lepyrodontopsis was placed in an isolated, basal position of the Lembophyllaceae-Neckeraceae clade. A subsequent phylogenetic work on the Hypnales published in 2009 found that many of the families were polyphyletic. The phylogenetic relationships of the Hypnales, and the position of Lepyrodontopsis within them, remains unresolved.

=== Invalid taxa ===
Of the two species described within Lepyrodontopsis, one is invalid. This is L. indica or L. indicum (it is variably conjugated), which was first described in 2010 by Dubagunta Subramanian. However, L. indicum was one of 148 invalid names proposed by Subramanian, all of which did not adhere to articles 39 and/or 40 of the Shenzhen Code: the inclusion of a Latin diagnosis and specific citations of a type specimen and where that specimen is accessioned, respectively.
