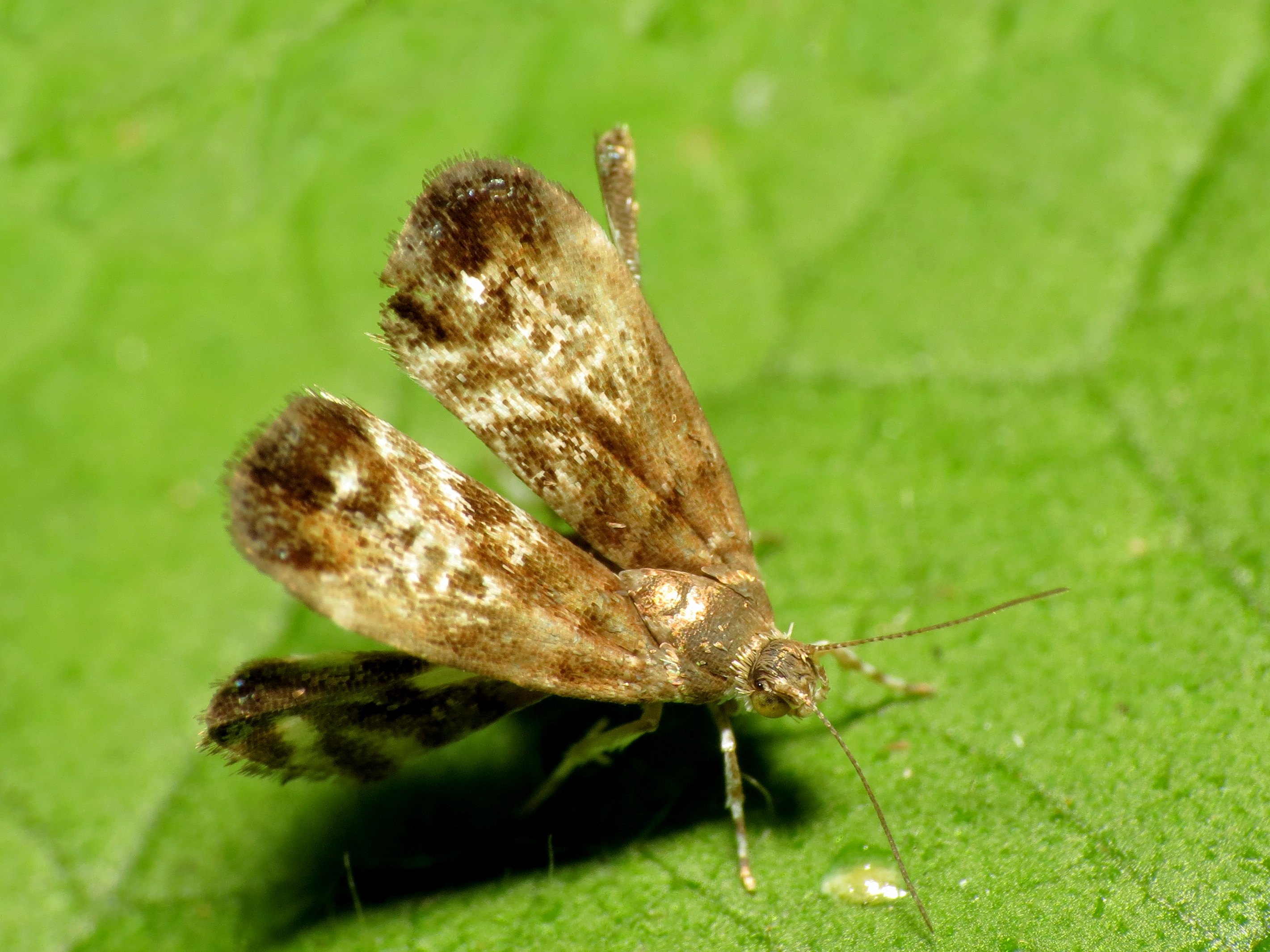

Scientific classification
- Kingdom: Animalia
- Phylum: Arthropoda
- Clade: Pancrustacea
- Class: Insecta
- Order: Lepidoptera
- Family: Choreutidae
- Genus: Brenthia
- Species: B. pavonacella

Binomial name
- Brenthia pavonacella Clemens, 1860

= Brenthia pavonacella =

Species of moth

Brenthia pavonacella, the peacock brenthia moth, is a moth of the family Choreutidae. It is found in North America, including Illinois, Maryland, Iowa, Oklahoma and South Carolina. It has also been recorded from Mexico.

The wingspan is about 9 mm (0.35 in). There are at least two generations per year in Illinois. Larvae can be found from early July to early September.

Host plant: The larvae has been recorded from Desmodium sp. (Fabaceae) in Illinois.
