= Zodia rutilella =

Scientific classification
- Kingdom: Animalia
- Phylum: Arthropoda
- Class: Insecta
- Order: Lepidoptera
- Family: Choreutidae
- Genus: Zodia
- Species: Z. rutilella

Binomial name
- Zodia rutilella (Walker, 1863)

Synonyms
- Simaethis rutilella Walker, 1863

Species of moth

Zodia rutilella is a moth of the family Choreutidae. It is known from Brazil.
