= Litobrenthia tetartodipla =

Scientific classification
- Domain: Eukaryota
- Kingdom: Animalia
- Phylum: Arthropoda
- Class: Insecta
- Order: Lepidoptera
- Family: Choreutidae
- Genus: Litobrenthia
- Species: L. tetartodipla

Binomial name
- Litobrenthia tetartodipla (Diakonoff, 1978)

Synonyms
- Brenthia tetartodipla Diakonoff, 1978

Species of moth

Litobrenthia tetartodipla is a moth in the family Choreutidae. It was described by Alexey Diakonoff in 1978. It is found in Zhejiang, China.
