= Zodia plutusana =

Scientific classification
- Kingdom: Animalia
- Phylum: Arthropoda
- Class: Insecta
- Order: Lepidoptera
- Family: Choreutidae
- Genus: Zodia
- Species: Z. plutusana

Binomial name
- Zodia plutusana (Walker, 1863)

Synonyms
- Simaethis plutusana Walker, 1863

Species of moth

Zodia plutusana is a moth of the family Choreutidae. It is known from Brazil.
