= Brenthia acmogramma =

Scientific classification
- Kingdom: Animalia
- Phylum: Arthropoda
- Class: Insecta
- Order: Lepidoptera
- Family: Choreutidae
- Genus: Brenthia
- Species: B. acmogramma

Binomial name
- Brenthia acmogramma Meyrick, 1915

Species of moth

Brenthia acmogramma is a species of moth of the family Choreutidae. It is known from Bolivia, (Songo, alt. 1150m) in South America.

This species has a wingspan of 13–14 mm. Lectotype is a male, slide No. 6532 in the BMNH.
