= Brenthia excusana =

Scientific classification
- Kingdom: Animalia
- Phylum: Arthropoda
- Class: Insecta
- Order: Lepidoptera
- Family: Choreutidae
- Genus: Brenthia
- Species: B. excusana

Binomial name
- Brenthia excusana (Walker, 1863)

Synonyms
- Simaethis excusana Walker, 1863

Species of moth

Brenthia excusana is a species of moth of the family Choreutidae. It was described by Francis Walker in 1863. It is found on Borneo.
