= Pseudanarta flavidens =

Scientific classification
- Kingdom: Animalia
- Phylum: Arthropoda
- Class: Insecta
- Order: Lepidoptera
- Superfamily: Noctuoidea
- Family: Noctuidae
- Genus: Pseudanarta
- Species: P. flavidens

Binomial name
- Pseudanarta flavidens (Grote, 1879)

Synonyms
- Hadena flavidens

Species of moth

Pseudanarta flavidens is a moth of the family Noctuidae. It is in North America, including Colorado and Arizona.

The wingspan is about 26 mm.
