= Brenthia leucatoma =

Scientific classification
- Kingdom: Animalia
- Phylum: Arthropoda
- Class: Insecta
- Order: Lepidoptera
- Family: Choreutidae
- Genus: Brenthia
- Species: B. leucatoma

Binomial name
- Brenthia leucatoma Meyrick, 1918

Species of moth

Brenthia leucatoma is a species of moth of the family Choreutidae. It is found in Ethiopia and South Africa.
