= Brenthia trimachaera =

Scientific classification
- Kingdom: Animalia
- Phylum: Arthropoda
- Class: Insecta
- Order: Lepidoptera
- Family: Choreutidae
- Genus: Brenthia
- Species: B. trimachaera

Binomial name
- Brenthia trimachaera Meyrick, 1927

Species of moth

Brenthia trimachaera is a species of moth of the family Choreutidae. It was described by Edward Meyrick in 1927. It is found on Samoa.
