= Pseudanarta caeca =

Scientific classification
- Domain: Eukaryota
- Kingdom: Animalia
- Phylum: Arthropoda
- Class: Insecta
- Order: Lepidoptera
- Superfamily: Noctuoidea
- Family: Noctuidae
- Genus: Pseudanarta
- Species: P. caeca

Binomial name
- Pseudanarta caeca Dod, 1913

Species of moth

Pseudanarta caeca is a species of cutworm or dart moth in the family Noctuidae. It is found in North America.

The MONA or Hodges number for Pseudanarta caeca is 9604.
