= Zodia (moth) =

Scientific classification
- Kingdom: Animalia
- Phylum: Arthropoda
- Clade: Pancrustacea
- Class: Insecta
- Order: Lepidoptera
- Family: Choreutidae
- Genus: Zodia; Heppner, 1979

Genus of moths

Zodia is a genus of moths in the family Choreutidae.

== Species ==
- Zodia chrysosperma (Meyrick, 1931)
- Zodia ochripalpis (Meyrick, 1920)
- Zodia plutusana (Walker, 1863)
- Zodia rutilella (Walker, 1863)
- Zodia scintillana (Walker, 1863)
