= Zodia scintillana =

Scientific classification
- Kingdom: Animalia
- Phylum: Arthropoda
- Class: Insecta
- Order: Lepidoptera
- Family: Choreutidae
- Genus: Zodia
- Species: Z. scintillana

Binomial name
- Zodia scintillana (Walker, 1863)

Synonyms
- Simaethis scintillana Walker, 1863

Species of moth

Zodia scintillana is a moth of the family Choreutidae. It is known from Central and South America, including Costa Rica. The habitat consists of tropical rain forests.

The length of the forewings is about 4-4.7 mm.
