= Brenthia elachista =

Scientific classification
- Domain: Eukaryota
- Kingdom: Animalia
- Phylum: Arthropoda
- Class: Insecta
- Order: Lepidoptera
- Family: Choreutidae
- Genus: Brenthia
- Species: B. elachista

Binomial name
- Brenthia elachista Walsingham, 1900

Species of moth

Brenthia elachista is a species of moth of the family Choreutidae. It was described by Thomas de Grey, 6th Baron Walsingham in 1900. It is found on Christmas Island, a territory of Australia in the Indian Ocean.
