= Litobrenthia grammodes =

Scientific classification
- Domain: Eukaryota
- Kingdom: Animalia
- Phylum: Arthropoda
- Class: Insecta
- Order: Lepidoptera
- Family: Choreutidae
- Genus: Litobrenthia
- Species: L. grammodes

Binomial name
- Litobrenthia grammodes Diakonoff, 1979

Species of moth

Litobrenthia grammodes is a moth in the family Choreutidae. It was described by Alexey Diakonoff in 1979. It is found in Taiwan.
