= Brenthia monolychna =

Scientific classification
- Kingdom: Animalia
- Phylum: Arthropoda
- Class: Insecta
- Order: Lepidoptera
- Family: Choreutidae
- Genus: Brenthia
- Species: B. monolychna

Binomial name
- Brenthia monolychna Meyrick, 1915

Species of moth

Brenthia monolychna is a species of moth of the family Choreutidae. It is found in Costa Rica.

Adults mimic jumping spiders.
