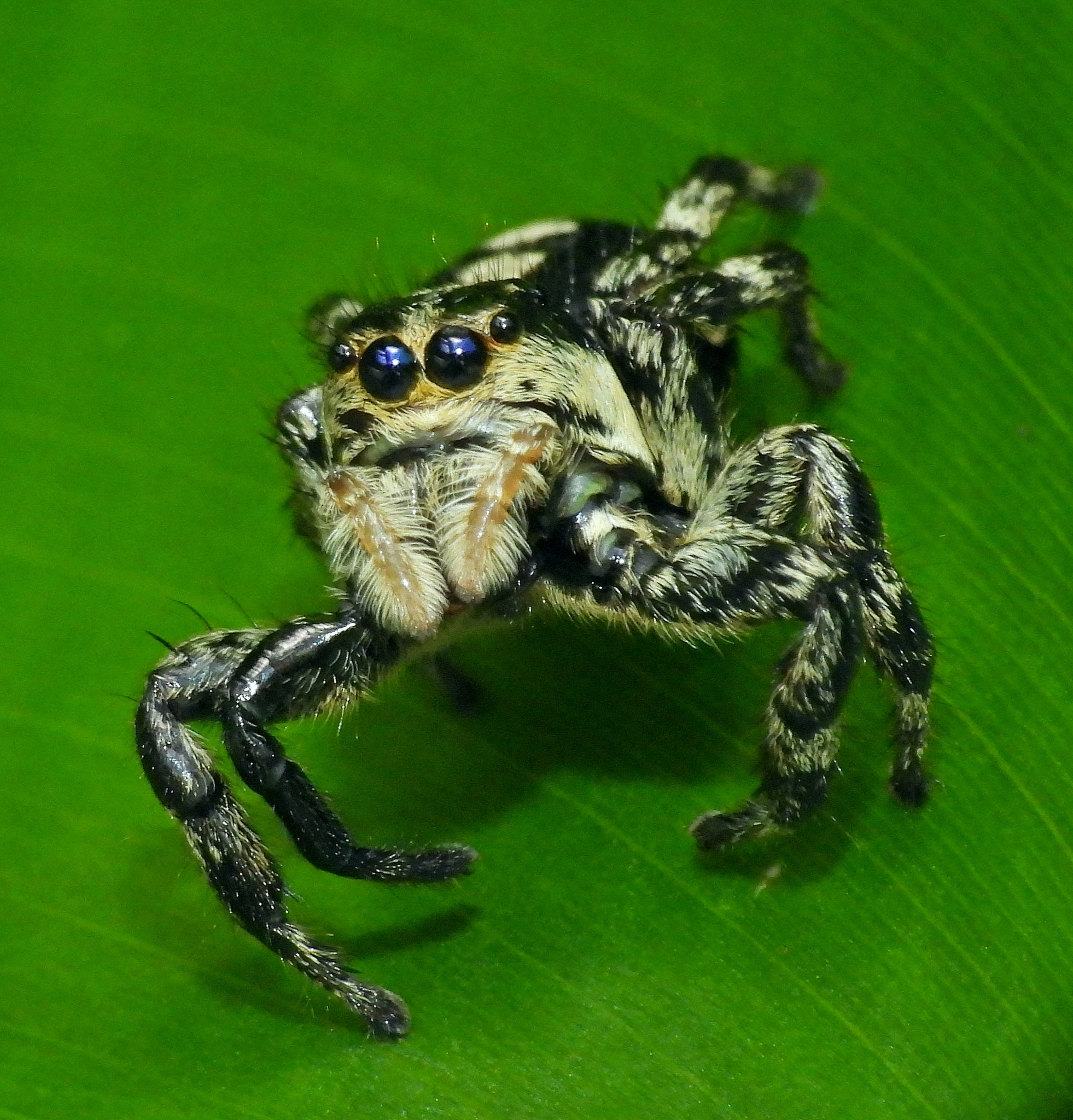
- female from Brazil
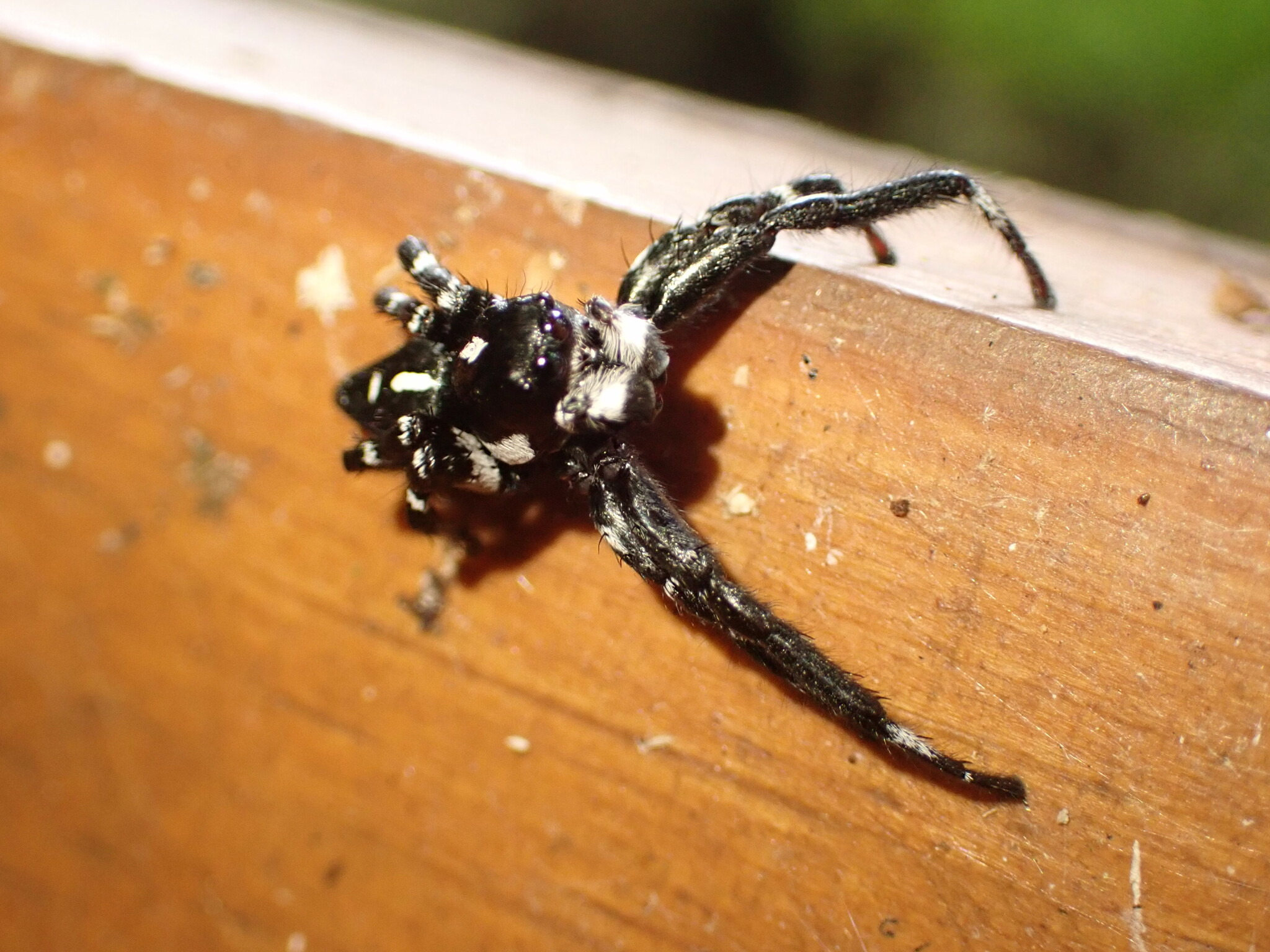
- male from Brazil

Scientific classification
- Kingdom: Animalia
- Phylum: Arthropoda
- Subphylum: Chelicerata
- Class: Arachnida
- Order: Araneae
- Infraorder: Araneomorphae
- Family: Salticidae
- Genus: Phiale
- Species: P. guttata

Binomial name
- Phiale guttata (C. L. Koch, 1846)

Synonyms
- Plexippus guttatus C. L. Koch, 1846; Plexippus flavoguttatus C. L. Koch, 1846; Cyrene magnifica Banks, 1909; Phiale magnifica (Banks, 1909); Phiale melanargyra Mello-Leitão, 1946

= Phiale guttata =

Species of jumping spider

Phiale guttata is a species of jumping spider of the genus Phiale. It is found from Costa Rica to Paraguay.

== Taxonomy ==
The species was originally described by C. L. Koch in 1846 as Plexippus guttatus. Koch also described the female form as a separate species, Plexippus flavoguttatus, in the same year. The species was later transferred to the genus Phiale by Galiano in 1979, who also synonymized several related species including Phiale magnifica (Banks, 1909) and Phiale melanargyra Mello-Leitão, 1946.

== Distribution ==
Phiale guttata has been recorded from Costa Rica, Panama, Colombia, Peru, Brazil, Paraguay, and northern Argentina. The type locality is Costa Rica.

== Description ==
1846 drawings by CL Koch

female

male

Females have a total length of 11.70 mm. The cephalothorax measures 5.53 mm long, 4.47 mm wide, and 2.67 mm high, with a clypeus height of 0.23 mm. The chelicerae are strong, vertical and parallel, with one tooth on the promargin and one tooth on the retromargin. The female shows variation in coloration, with the carapace stripes having white hairs and the fourth tarsus being black in specimens from Belem do Pará.

Males are considerably smaller, with a cephalothorax measuring 4.53 mm long, 3.73 mm wide, and 2.07 mm high. The clypeus is 0.27 mm high. The carapace is dark reddish brown with dark hairs, featuring two broad marginal stripes with white hairs extending from opposite posterior lateral eyes to the posterior legs. A central white spot is present on the thoracic groove. The opisthosoma is brown with blackish brown hairs and distinctive patches covered with white hairs, including a central row of four spots and additional markings on each side.

Both sexes have the characteristic eye arrangement with small eyes of the second row positioned closer to the anterior lateral eyes than to the posterior lateral eyes.
