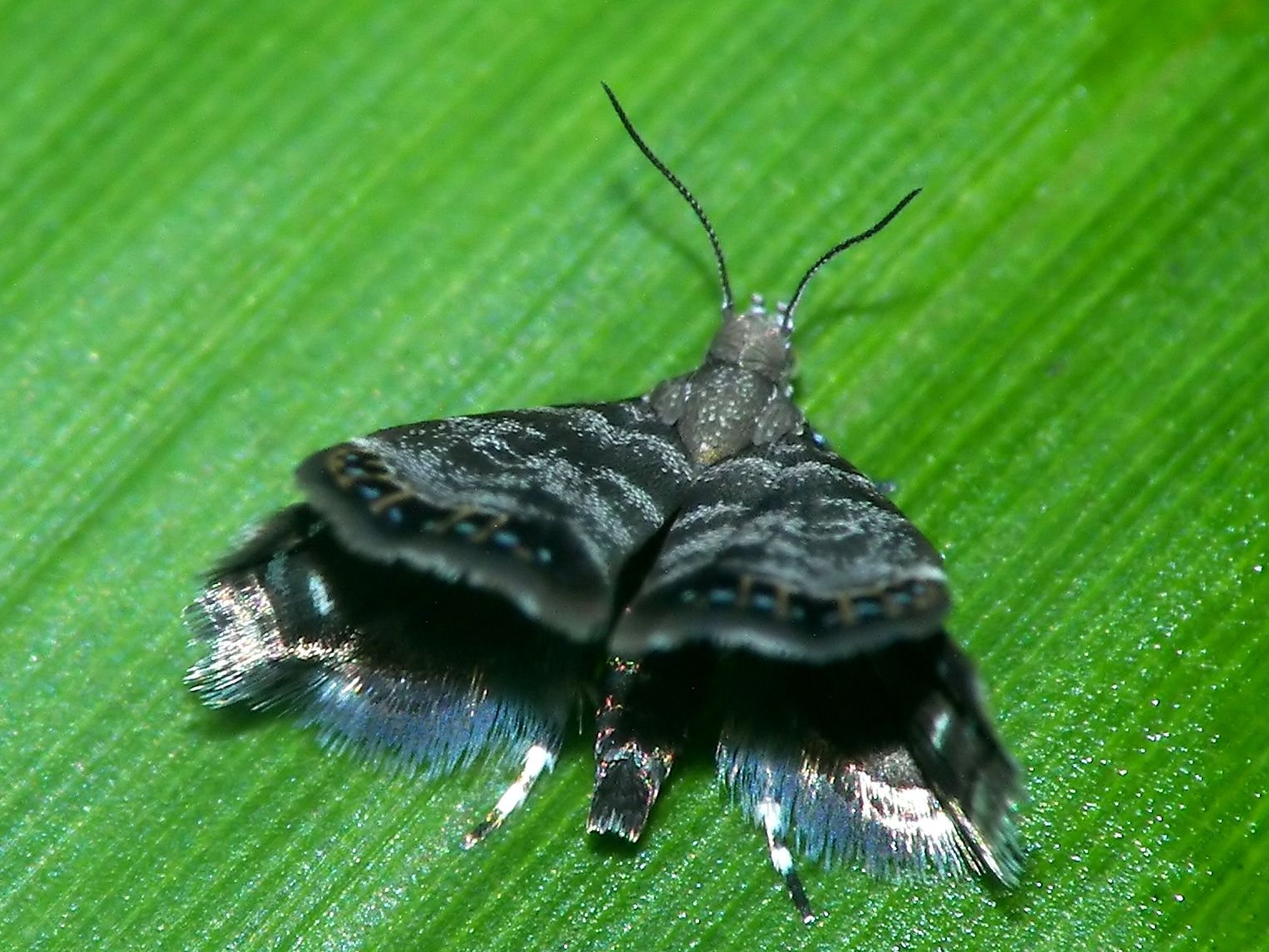

Scientific classification
- Kingdom: Animalia
- Phylum: Arthropoda
- Class: Insecta
- Order: Lepidoptera
- Family: Choreutidae
- Genus: Brenthia
- Species: B. catenata

Binomial name
- Brenthia catenata Meyrick, 1907

= Brenthia catenata =

Species of moth

Brenthia catenata is a species of moth of the family Choreutidae. It was described by Edward Meyrick in 1907. It is found in India, Sri Lanka, the Philippines and Samoa.

The larvae feed on Erythrina species.
