= Brenthia dendronympha =

Scientific classification
- Kingdom: Animalia
- Phylum: Arthropoda
- Class: Insecta
- Order: Lepidoptera
- Family: Choreutidae
- Genus: Brenthia
- Species: B. dendronympha

Binomial name
- Brenthia dendronympha Meyrick, 1937

Species of moth

Brenthia dendronympha is a species of moth of the family Choreutidae. It was described by Edward Meyrick in 1937. It is found in India.

== Host plant ==
It's larvae feed on Shorea robusta (Dipterocarpaceae)
