= Brenthia harmonica =

Scientific classification
- Kingdom: Animalia
- Phylum: Arthropoda
- Class: Insecta
- Order: Lepidoptera
- Family: Choreutidae
- Genus: Brenthia
- Species: B. harmonica

Binomial name
- Brenthia harmonica Meyrick, 1918

Species of moth

Brenthia harmonica is a species of moth of the family Choreutidae. It was described by Edward Meyrick in 1918. It is found in the Philippines.
