= Brenthia sapindella =

Scientific classification
- Kingdom: Animalia
- Phylum: Arthropoda
- Class: Insecta
- Order: Lepidoptera
- Family: Choreutidae
- Genus: Brenthia
- Species: B. sapindella

Binomial name
- Brenthia sapindella Busck, 1934

Species of moth

Brenthia sapindella is a moth of the family Choreutidae. It is known from Cuba.

The length of the forewings is 3.6-3.8 mm for males and 3.8–4 mm for females.

The larvae feed on Sapindus raponarius.
