= Brenthia ocularis =

Scientific classification
- Domain: Eukaryota
- Kingdom: Animalia
- Phylum: Arthropoda
- Class: Insecta
- Order: Lepidoptera
- Family: Choreutidae
- Genus: Brenthia
- Species: B. ocularis

Binomial name
- Brenthia ocularis C. Felder, R. Felder & Rogenhofer, 1875

Species of moth

Brenthia ocularis is a species of moth of the family Choreutidae. It was described by Cajetan Felder, Rudolf Felder and Alois Friedrich Rogenhofer in 1875. It is found on Java.
