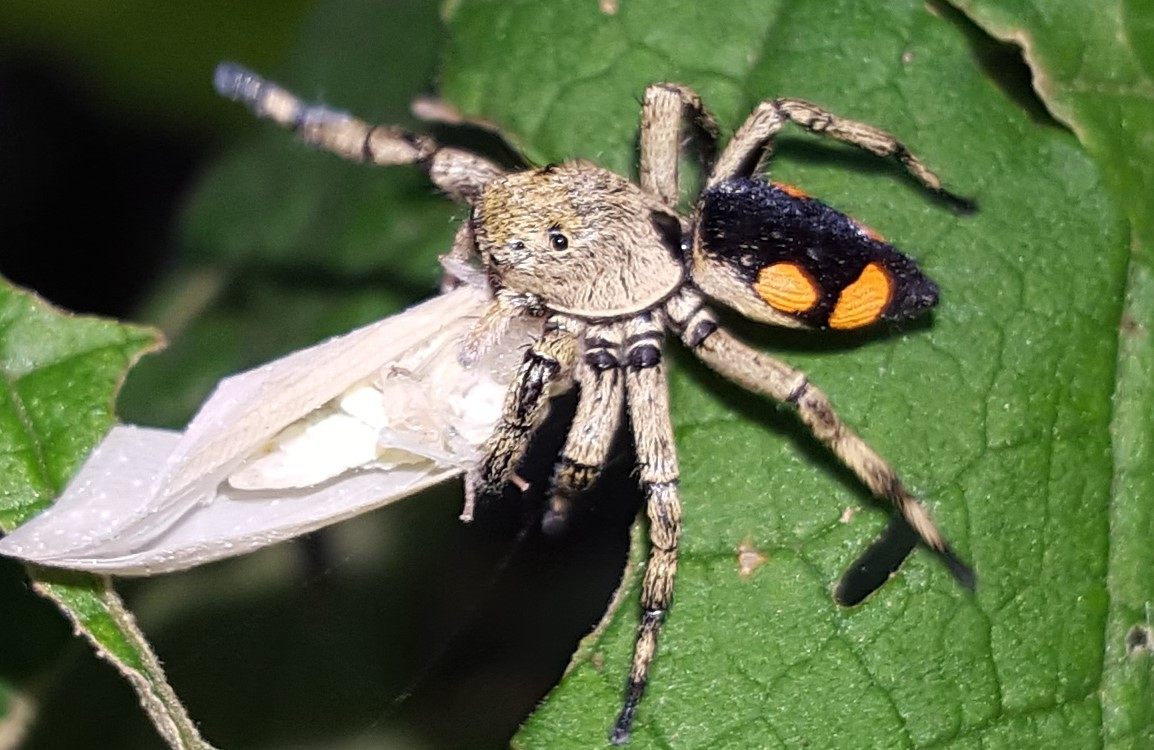
- Female from Brazil
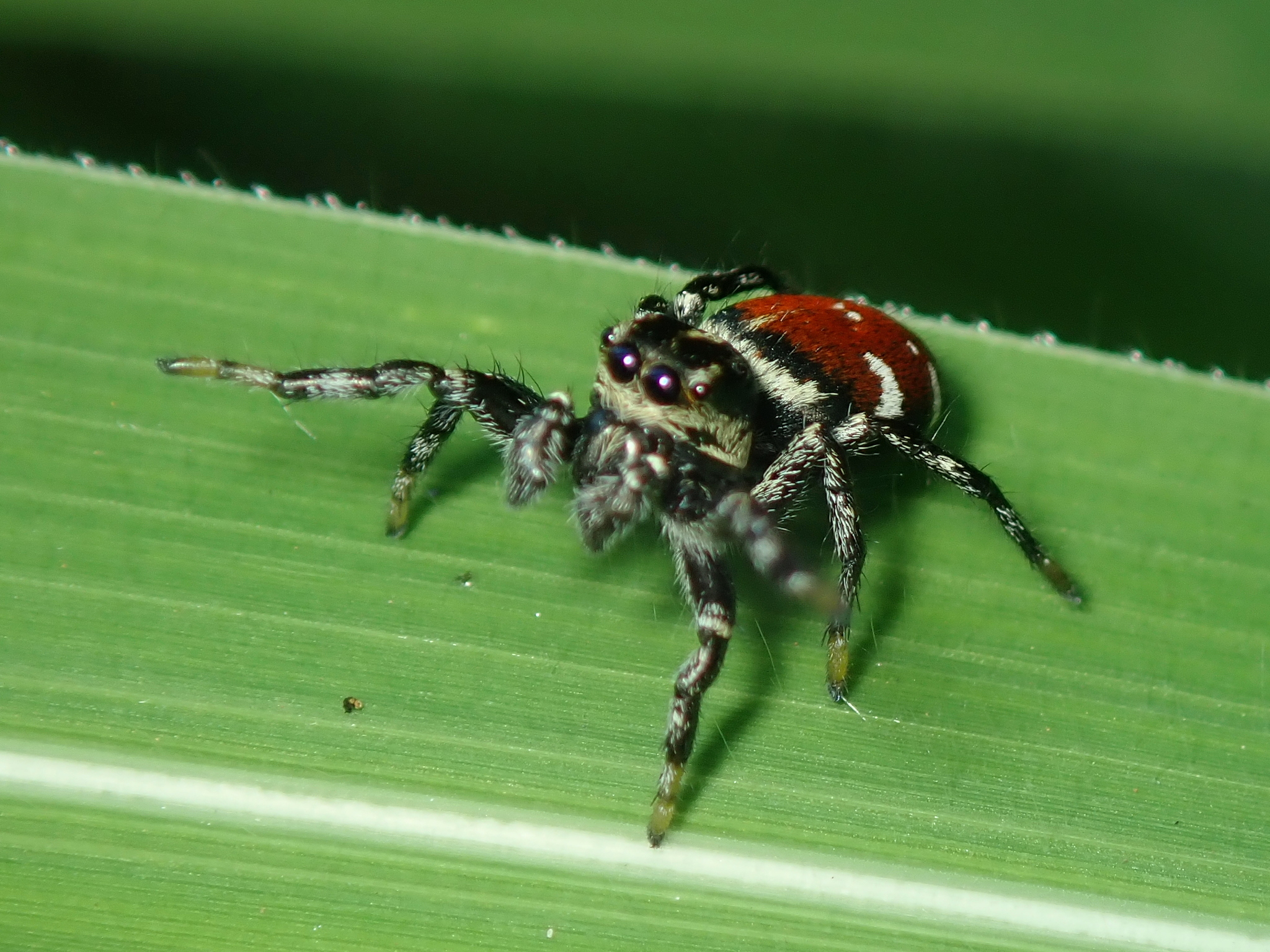
- Juvenile male

Scientific classification
- Kingdom: Animalia
- Phylum: Arthropoda
- Subphylum: Chelicerata
- Class: Arachnida
- Order: Araneae
- Infraorder: Araneomorphae
- Family: Salticidae
- Genus: Phiale
- Species: P. gratiosa

Binomial name
- Phiale gratiosa C. L. Koch, 1846

Synonyms
- Phiale berina C. L. Koch, 1846; Phiale rufoguttata C. L. Koch, 1846; Phiale variegata (Peckham & Peckham, 1901); Plexippus selectus C. L. Koch, 1846; Pardessus gratiosus (Peckham & Peckham, 1896); Palestrina variegata Peckham & Peckham, 1901; Menemerus 4-notatus Mello-Leitão, 1939; Menemerus ursinus Mello-Leitão, 1945; Freya haemorrhoa Mello-Leitão, 1945

= Phiale gratiosa =

Species of jumping spider

Phiale gratiosa is a species of jumping spider in the genus Phiale. It is found in tropical and subtropical regions of South America, including Brazil, Paraguay, and Argentina. The species serves as the type species for its genus and is notable for exhibiting significant polymorphism in abdominal coloration patterns.

== Etymology ==
The species name gratiosa is derived from Latin gratiosus meaning "popular" or "agreeable".

== Taxonomy ==
Phiale gratiosa was first described by Carl Ludwig Koch in 1846. The species has a complex taxonomic history, with numerous synonyms that were later recognized as variations of the same polymorphic species. In 1981, María Elena Galiano conducted a comprehensive revision that synonymized eight previously separate species under P. gratiosa, recognizing them as color variants of a single polymorphic species.

== Distribution ==
Phiale gratiosa has been recorded from tropical and subtropical regions of South America. The species is found in Brazil (including São Paulo, Minas Gerais, Mato Grosso, and Amazonas states), Paraguay (San Pedro Department, Concepción Department), and Argentina (Misiones province).

== Habitat ==
P. gratiosa inhabits tropical and subtropical forests, where it prefers open and sunny places such as road verges with thick growths of grasses. The species has been observed among various plants including grasses of the family Poaceae, such as Setaria poiretiana.

== Description ==
Variants drawn by CL Koch (1846)

female

female

female

male?

male

Phiale gratiosa exhibits remarkable polymorphism in coloration, particularly in abdominal patterns. Females display more variation than males in their color patterns.

=== Females ===
The female cephalothorax measures 4.13 mm in length and 3.26 mm in width, with a height of 1.75 mm. The chelicerae are relatively long and robust, similar to other species in the group.

The opisthosoma shows three main color pattern variants: (a) abdomen covered with black hairs mixed with yellow, white and orange hairs; (b) abdomen covered with black hairs and two pairs of lateral patches of yellow, orange or red hairs; and (c) abdomen covered with black hairs and a marginal band of yellow, orange or red hairs. The lateral bands with white hairs may be replaced by patches that are either black with many white hairs on the femora of legs III and IV and on the tibiae and metatarsi of legs I and II.

=== Males ===
Males have the opisthosoma either red or black, with an anterior white band that runs along both sides and widens in the middle of the lateral part, forming a round white spot. There is another pair of white spots at the posterior end of the abdomen. The pedipalps are black, with the dorsal distal end of the femur and proximal half of the cymbium covered with long white hairs, while the distal half of the cymbium is brown.

== Behavior ==
P. gratiosa has an annual life cycle, with adults appearing in spring (October-November in the Southern Hemisphere). The species constructs white silk tube retreats approximately 3-5 cm long, which are wider in the central part and open at both ends. These retreats are built in the angles of bent leaves or at the corners formed by walls and roofs.

The species exhibits typical jumping spider behavior, wandering along the upper surfaces of leaves, especially in late afternoon. When threatened, individuals remain stationary while watching approaching danger, rotating their cephalothorax and waving their palps and legs in a threat display before running or jumping away.

Mating and egg-laying occur inside the silk retreats. Females remain with their egg sacs until emergence, and both mother and offspring can be observed walking in and out of the nest until final dispersal.
