= Brenthia nephelosema =

Scientific classification
- Domain: Eukaryota
- Kingdom: Animalia
- Phylum: Arthropoda
- Class: Insecta
- Order: Lepidoptera
- Family: Choreutidae
- Genus: Brenthia
- Species: B. nephelosema

Binomial name
- Brenthia nephelosema Diakonoff, 1978

Species of moth

Brenthia nephelosema is a species of moth of the family Choreutidae. It was described by Alexey Diakonoff in 1978. It is found in Fujian, China.
