= Brenthia salaconia =

Scientific classification
- Kingdom: Animalia
- Phylum: Arthropoda
- Class: Insecta
- Order: Lepidoptera
- Family: Choreutidae
- Genus: Brenthia
- Species: B. salaconia

Binomial name
- Brenthia salaconia Meyrick, 1910

Species of moth

Brenthia salaconia is a species of moth of the family Choreutidae. It was described by Edward Meyrick in 1910. It is found on the Kai Islands of Indonesia.

This species has a wingspan of 9–11 mm. The forewings are dark fuscous with an irregular straight whitish transverse streak before one-third and a transverse-oval discal spot outlined with white, surrounding which is an irregular whitish ring almost or quite touching the costa and dorsum. There is also a moderately broad blackish terminal fascia, edged anteriorly with whitish and preceded by a parallel whitish line, the upper extremity cut off so as to form two small spots, marked near the posterior edge with five violet-golden-metallic dots, of which two are in the two upper spots, and the upper spot also preceded by a small golden-violet spot. The hindwings are dark fuscous with a small obscure whitish spot in the middle of the disc and there is a transverse shining violet mark before the apex. On the lower two-thirds of the wing is a shining violet-white subterminal streak and a suffused orange terminal streak.
