= Brenthia virginalis =

Scientific classification
- Kingdom: Animalia
- Phylum: Arthropoda
- Class: Insecta
- Order: Lepidoptera
- Family: Choreutidae
- Genus: Brenthia
- Species: B. virginalis

Binomial name
- Brenthia virginalis Meyrick, 1912

Species of moth

Brenthia virginalis is a species of moth of the family Choreutidae. It is found in South Africa.
