= Brenthia quadriforella =

Scientific classification
- Kingdom: Animalia
- Phylum: Arthropoda
- Clade: Pancrustacea
- Class: Insecta
- Order: Lepidoptera
- Family: Choreutidae
- Genus: Brenthia
- Species: B. quadriforella

Binomial name
- Brenthia quadriforella Zeller, 1877

Synonyms
- Brenthia quadriflorella; Simaethis hypocalla Meyrick, 1905

Species of moth

Brenthia quadriforella is a species of moth of the family Choreutidae. It was described from New Britain, but is also present in country of Australia (the Northern Territory and eastern Queensland) and Fiji.
