= Pseudanarta exasperata =

Scientific classification
- Domain: Eukaryota
- Kingdom: Animalia
- Phylum: Arthropoda
- Class: Insecta
- Order: Lepidoptera
- Superfamily: Noctuoidea
- Family: Noctuidae
- Tribe: Xylenini
- Genus: Pseudanarta
- Species: P. exasperata

Binomial name
- Pseudanarta exasperata Franclemont, 1941

Species of moth

Pseudanarta exasperata is a species of cutworm or dart moth in the family Noctuidae. It is found in North America.

The MONA or Hodges number for Pseudanarta exasperata is 9609.
