= Phiale elegans =

Scientific classification
- Kingdom: Animalia
- Phylum: Arthropoda
- Subphylum: Chelicerata
- Class: Arachnida
- Order: Araneae
- Infraorder: Araneomorphae
- Family: Salticidae
- Genus: Phiale
- Species: P. elegans

Binomial name
- Phiale elegans (F. O. P.-Cambridge, 1901)

Synonyms
- Cyrene elegans F. O. Pickard-Cambridge, 1901; Phiale elegans Simon, 1903

Species of spider

Phiale elegans is a species of spiders of the jumping spider family, Salticidae.

It is found in Panama.
