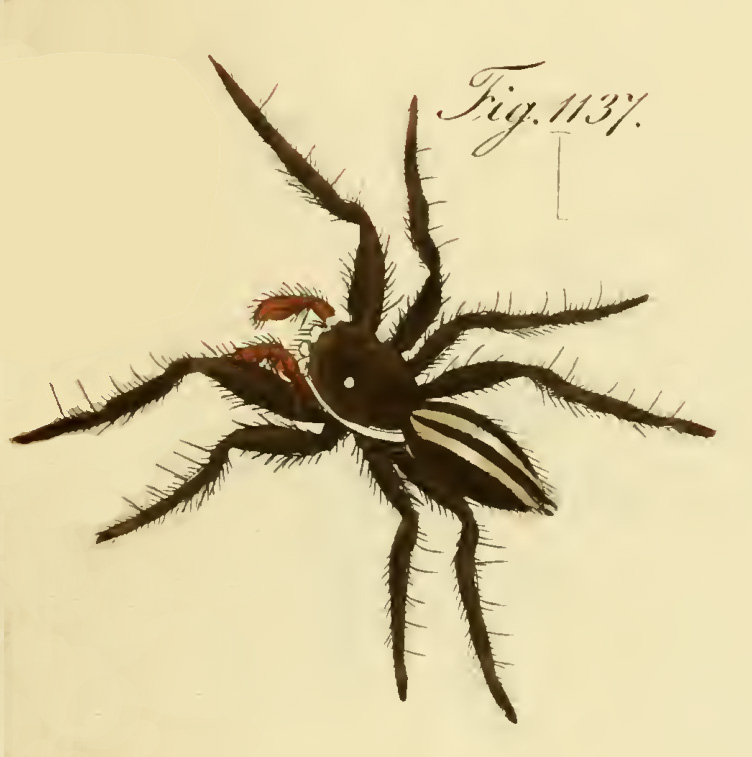
- Female from Koch 1846
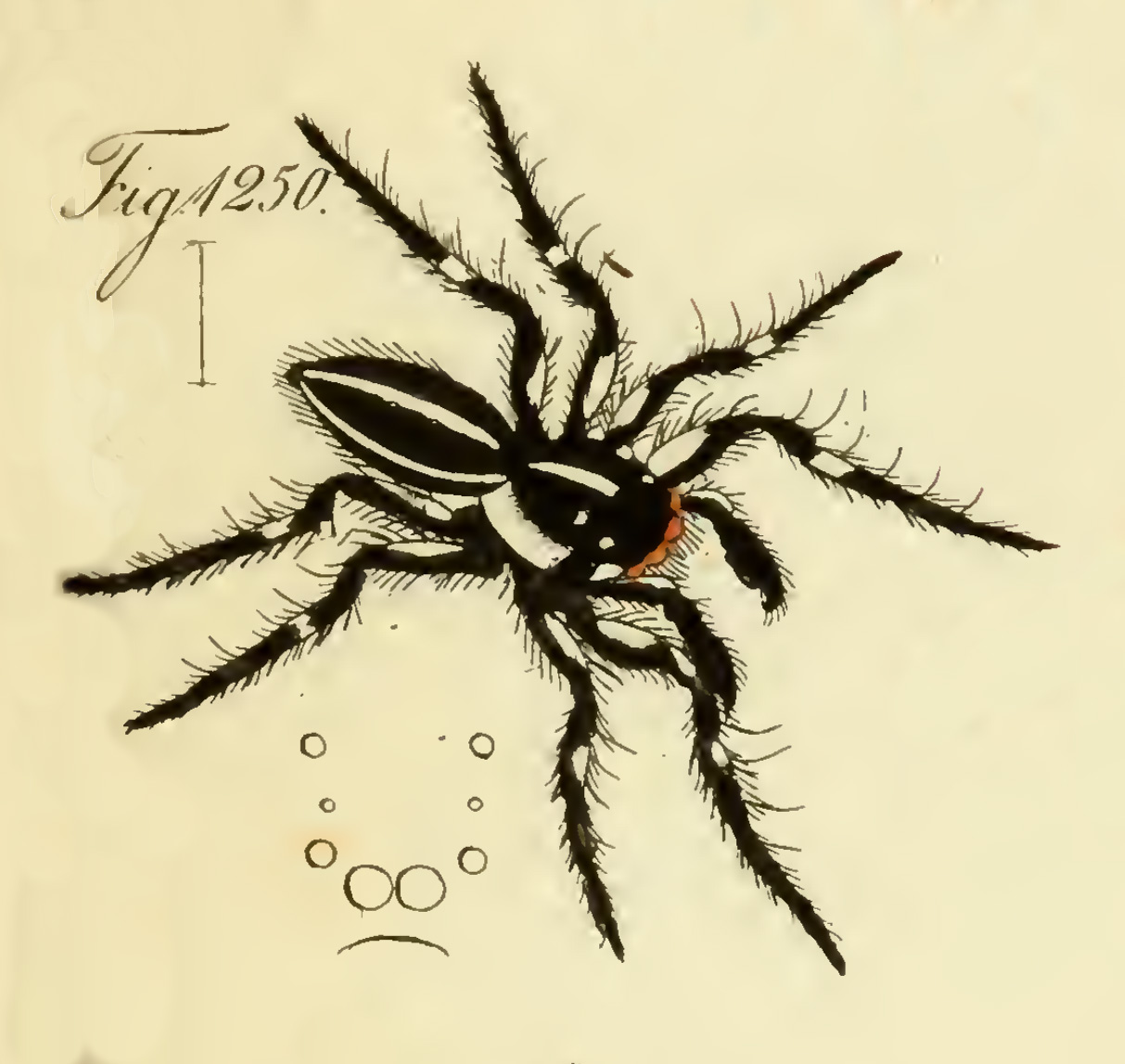
- Male from Koch 1846

Scientific classification
- Kingdom: Animalia
- Phylum: Arthropoda
- Subphylum: Chelicerata
- Class: Arachnida
- Order: Araneae
- Infraorder: Araneomorphae
- Family: Salticidae
- Genus: Phiale
- Species: P. mimica

Binomial name
- Phiale mimica (C. L. Koch, 1846)

Synonyms
- Plexippus mimicus C. L. Koch, 1846; Euophrys bella C. L. Koch, 1846; Freya bella (C. L. Koch, 1850); Pardessus mimicus (Peckham & Peckham, 1896)

= Phiale mimica =

Species of jumping spider

Phiale mimica is a species of jumping spider in the family Salticidae. It is found Brazil but its range may extend more widely across South America, as part of a group of allied species also found in Central America.

== Taxonomy ==
The species Phiale mimica was originally described by Carl Ludwig Koch in 1846 for specimens originating from Southeastern Brazil, initially under two separate names: Plexippus mimicus for a female and Euophrys bella for a male. These were later recognized as the same species and synonymized by María Elena Galiano in 1981.

Phiale mimica belongs to the mimica species group within the genus Phiale (informally called "complex Phiale mimica"). This group includes the following five similar species, found in Central and South America:

- Phiale bulbosa (F. O. Pickard-Cambridge, 1901)
- Phiale crocea C. L. Koch, 1846
- Phiale mimica (C. L. Koch, 1846)
- Phiale ortrudae Galiano, 1981
- Phiale tristis Mello-Leitão, 1945

== Distribution ==
The species Phiale mimica was recorded from various localities in Southeastern Brazil in the morphological revision by María Elena Galiano, 1981., using a narrowed definition of species compared to some historic usage. Accordingly, she confirmed records of Phiale mimica from the coastal Brazilan states of Sao Paulo, Espírito Santo & Bahia that together comprese the Atlantic Forest (Mata Atlântica) biome. In her work she dismissed several other potential records from distant geographic zones such as Panama as being misidentified, so belonging to other allied species of the wider mimica species group (e.g. older panamanian records of "mimica" by Petrunkevitch 1925 or Chickering 1946). However, recently, Courtial et al. 2026 provide a new country record for Phiale mimica from French Guiana, and give the distribution (p.110) as "Mexico, Panama, French Guiana, Brazil, Peru". The distribution is instead reflected as French Guiana and Brazil on World Spider Catalog (Oct. 2026). while the wider mimica species group (informally as "complex Phiale mimica") is reflected on the iNaturalist initiative.

== Description ==
Phiale mimica is a moderately robust jumping spider. The original description by Koch noted the male as having a black body with yellow markings, including a broad curved stripe around the head region and three broad transverse stripes on the abdomen that are bright yellow. The legs are yellow with black, hairy segments.

Like other members of the mimica group, this species exhibits the characteristic palpal and epigynal features of the genus Phiale. Males have a transverse tegular division with a well-developed proximal retrolateral lobe, while females possess unique epigynal copulatory openings with extended outer edges forming secondary atria within larger atrial depressions.

== Habitat and behavior ==
Complex Phiale mimica, Colombia

Members of the mimica group, including Phiale mimica, are typically found by beating branches along forest edges. They exhibit behavioral patterns similar to species in the genus Pachomius, including characteristic waving of the front legs. However, species in the mimica group are generally more robust in build than Pachomius species, though smaller than members of the formosa or gratiosa groups within Phiale.

Some females in the mimica group display bright warning colors that may serve as mimicry of female mutillid wasps (velvet ants).
