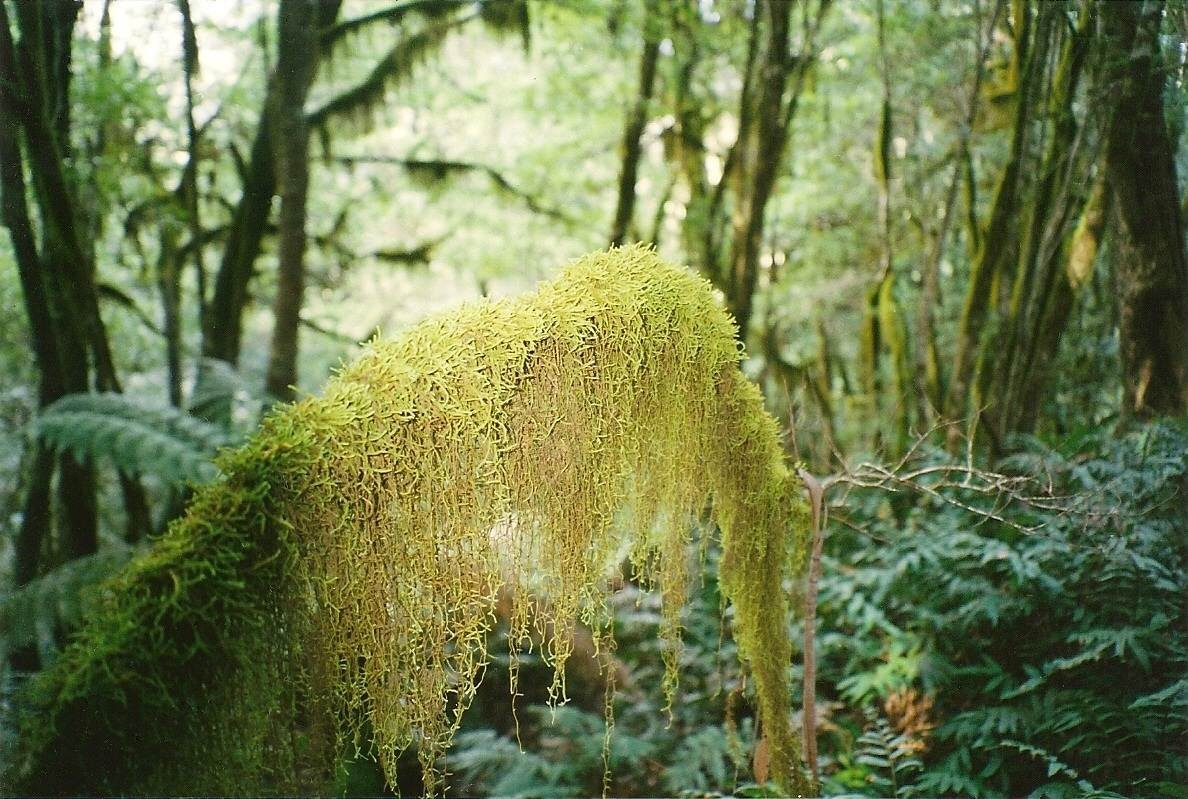
- Hanging moss in a Cool Temperate Rainforest at Budawang National Park, Australia

Scientific classification
- Kingdom: Plantae
- Division: Bryophyta
- Class: Bryopsida
- Subclass: Bryidae
- Order: Hypnales
- Family: Meteoriaceae
- Genus: Papillaria
- Species: P. crocea

Binomial name
- Papillaria crocea Jaeger, 1877

Synonyms
- Pilotrichum croceum Hampe (1853); Pilotrichum sieberi Hampe (1847); Pilotrichum nigrescens Hornsch. ex Müll.Hal. (1850), nom. inval. (in synon.); Neckera nigrescens Hornsch. ex Hampe (1881), nom. inval. (in synon.); Meteorium cuspidiferum Wilson (1854); Papillaria cuspidifera (Wilson) A.Jaeger (1877); Neckera kermadecensis Müll.Hal. (1857); Papillaria kermadecensis (Müll.Hal.) A.Jaeger (1877); Pilotrichella kermadecensis (Müll.Hal.) Hampe (1881); Meteorium kermadecense (Müll.Hal.) Mitt. (1882); Trachypus hornschuchii Mitt. (1860); Trachycarpus hornschuchii Mitt. ex Burges (1935), nom. inval. (orthogr.); Neckera reginae Hampe (1876); Papillaria reginae (Hampe) A.Jaeger (1877); Pilotrichella reginae (Hampe) Hampe (1881); Meteorium reginae (Hampe) Mitt. (1882)

= Papillaria crocea =

Species of moss

Papillaria crocea is a species of moss. It may be seen as an epiphyte in moist Australian forests.
