= Brenthia thoracosema =

Scientific classification
- Domain: Eukaryota
- Kingdom: Animalia
- Phylum: Arthropoda
- Class: Insecta
- Order: Lepidoptera
- Family: Choreutidae
- Genus: Brenthia
- Species: B. thoracosema

Binomial name
- Brenthia thoracosema Diakonoff, 1982

Species of moth

Brenthia thoracosema is a species of moth of the family Choreutidae. It was described by Alexey Diakonoff in 1982. It is found in Sri Lanka.

== Description ==
The wingspan of the adult female is 11.5 mm. Its head is purplish black. Antenna fuscous. Basal half of antennae with white rings. Palpi and thorax purplish black. Abdomen purple. Forewings broadly triangular. Apex and long termen rounded. Basal patch is purplish black, with bluish-white scaly dusting. Cilia purplish fuscous. Hindwings pale purplish fuscous. Cilia fuscous.
