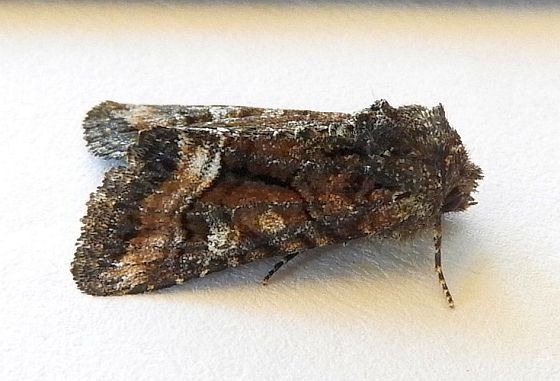

Scientific classification
- Kingdom: Animalia
- Phylum: Arthropoda
- Class: Insecta
- Order: Lepidoptera
- Superfamily: Noctuoidea
- Family: Noctuidae
- Tribe: Xylenini
- Genus: Pseudanarta
- Species: P. actura

Binomial name
- Pseudanarta actura Smith, 1908

= Pseudanarta actura =

Species of moth

Pseudanarta actura is a species of cutworm or dart moth in the family Noctuidae. It is found in North America.

== Subspecies ==
These two subspecies belong to the species Pseudanarta actura:

- Pseudanarta actura actura
- Pseudanarta actura ate Dyar, 1921
