= Cordia obliqua =

Scientific classification
- Kingdom: Plantae
- Clade: Tracheophytes
- Clade: Angiosperms
- Clade: Eudicots
- Clade: Asterids
- Order: Boraginales
- Family: Cordiaceae
- Genus: Cordia
- Species: C. obliqua

Binomial name
- Cordia obliqua Willd. Species Plantarum 1(2):1072. 1798

Species of flowering plant

Cordia obliqua, the clammy cherry, is a flowering plant species in the genus Cordia.

The larvae of Brenthia coronigera, a species of moth found in Bengal, India, feeds on Cordia obliqua.

Hesperetin 7-rhamnoside, a glycoside of hesperetin, can be isolated from the plant.
