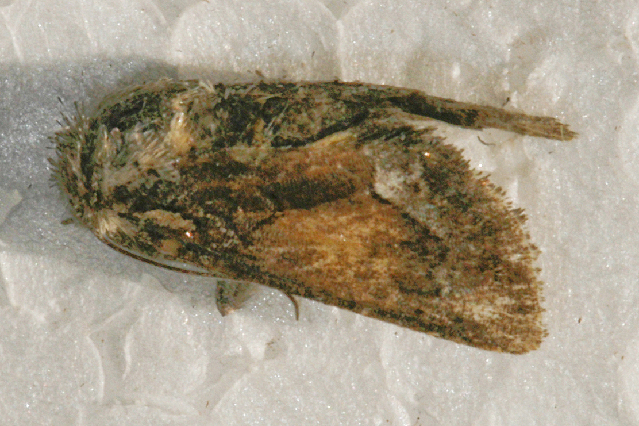

Scientific classification
- Domain: Eukaryota
- Kingdom: Animalia
- Phylum: Arthropoda
- Class: Insecta
- Order: Lepidoptera
- Superfamily: Noctuoidea
- Family: Noctuidae
- Genus: Pseudanarta
- Species: P. flava

Binomial name
- Pseudanarta flava (Grote, 1874)

= Pseudanarta flava =

Species of moth

Pseudanarta flava is a species of cutworm or dart moth in the family Noctuidae. It is found in North America.

The MONA or Hodges number for Pseudanarta flava is 9606.
