= Brenthia anisopa =

Scientific classification
- Domain: Eukaryota
- Kingdom: Animalia
- Phylum: Arthropoda
- Class: Insecta
- Order: Lepidoptera
- Family: Choreutidae
- Genus: Brenthia
- Species: B. anisopa

Binomial name
- Brenthia anisopa Diakonoff, 1968

Species of moth

Brenthia anisopa is a species of moth of the family Choreutidae. It was described by Alexey Diakonoff in 1968. It is found on Luzon island in the Philippines.
