= Brenthia trilitha =

Scientific classification
- Kingdom: Animalia
- Phylum: Arthropoda
- Class: Insecta
- Order: Lepidoptera
- Family: Choreutidae
- Genus: Brenthia
- Species: B. trilitha

Binomial name
- Brenthia trilitha Meyrick, 1907

Species of moth

Brenthia trilitha is a species of moth of the family Choreutidae. It was described by Edward Meyrick in 1907. It is found on the Solomon Islands.
