= Pseudanarta singula =

Scientific classification
- Domain: Eukaryota
- Kingdom: Animalia
- Phylum: Arthropoda
- Class: Insecta
- Order: Lepidoptera
- Superfamily: Noctuoidea
- Family: Noctuidae
- Genus: Pseudanarta
- Species: P. singula

Binomial name
- Pseudanarta singula Grote, 1880

Synonyms
- Hadena singula

Species of moth

Pseudanarta singula is a moth of the family Noctuidae. It is in the south-western parts of the United States, including Texas, California and Utah.

The wingspan is about 27 mm.
