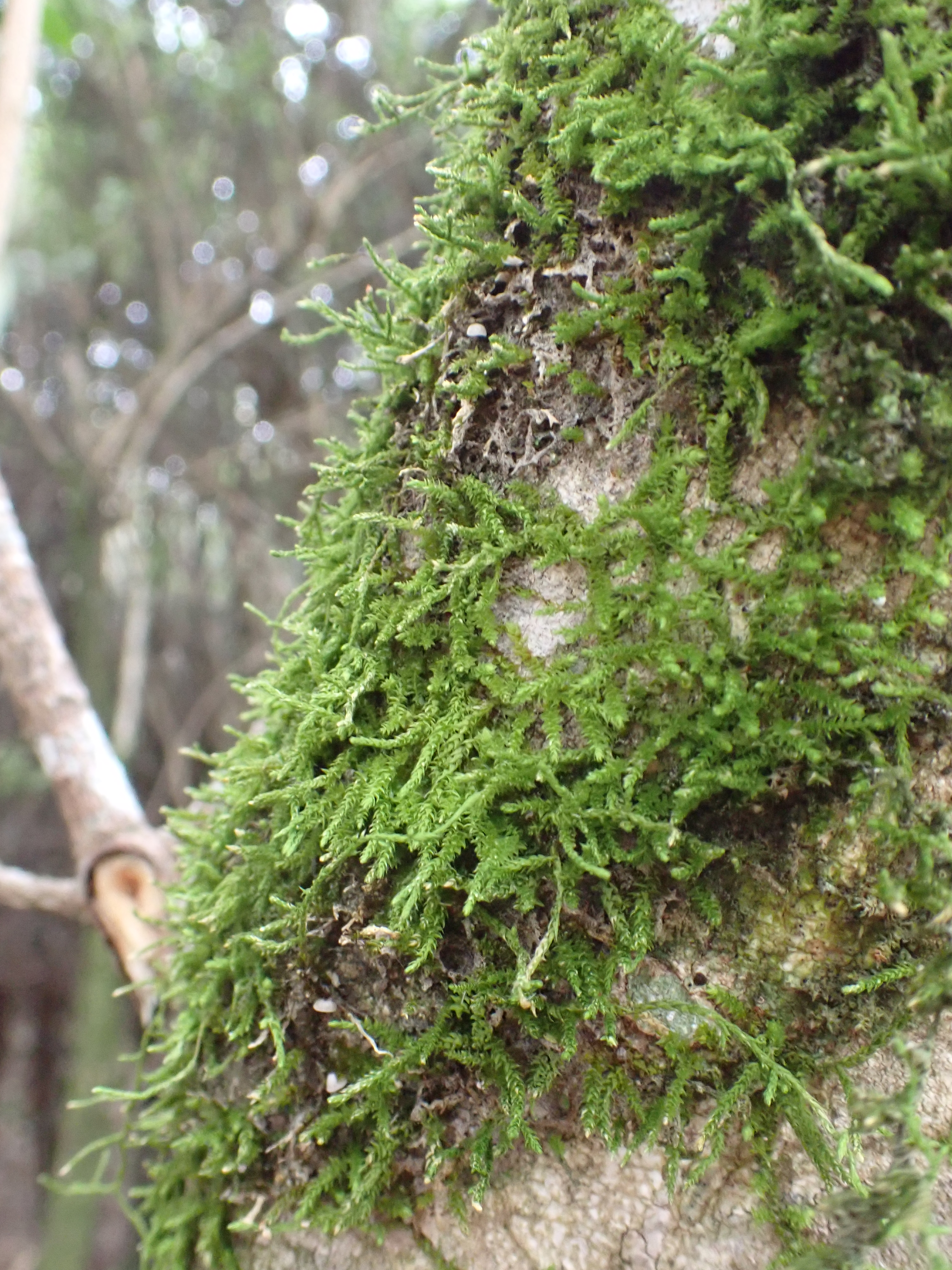
- Papillaria flexicaulis growing on a tree trunk. Wainuiomata, New Zealand.

Scientific classification
- Kingdom: Plantae
- Division: Bryophyta
- Class: Bryopsida
- Subclass: Bryidae
- Order: Hypnales
- Family: Meteoriaceae
- Genus: Papillaria

= Papillaria =

Genus of mosses

Papillaria is the largest genus in the family Meteoriaceae, with c. 70 species

== Description ==
Commonly found in canopies, on tree branches and trunks, in tropical subtropical and temperate forest.

== Etymology ==
Papilla in Latin can mean nipple, teat or bud. Named for the nipple-like structures on the surface of the leaf cells.

== Taxonomy ==
Papillaria contains the following species:

- Papillaria deppei
- Papillaria nitidiuscula
- Papillaria imponderosa
- Papillaria nigrescens
- Papillaria guarapiensis
- Papillaria chrysoclada
- Papillaria amblyacis
- Papillaria leuconeura
- Papillaria africana
- Papillaria flexicaulis
- Papillaria nitens
- Papillaria crocea
- Papillaria flavolimbata
