= Litobrenthia angustipunctata =

Scientific classification
- Domain: Eukaryota
- Kingdom: Animalia
- Phylum: Arthropoda
- Class: Insecta
- Order: Lepidoptera
- Family: Choreutidae
- Genus: Litobrenthia
- Species: L. angustipunctata

Binomial name
- Litobrenthia angustipunctata Budashkin & Li, 2009

Species of moth

Litobrenthia angustipunctata is a moth of the family Choreutidae. It is known from Hunan, China.

The wingspan is 10.5–11.0 mm.
