= Brenthia diplotaphra =

Scientific classification
- Domain: Eukaryota
- Kingdom: Animalia
- Phylum: Arthropoda
- Class: Insecta
- Order: Lepidoptera
- Family: Choreutidae
- Genus: Brenthia
- Species: B. diplotaphra

Binomial name
- Brenthia diplotaphra Meyrick, 1938

Species of moth

Brenthia diplotaphra is a species of moth of the family Choreutidae. It was described by Edward Meyrick in 1938. It is found in Papua New Guinea.
