= Brenthia melodica =

Scientific classification
- Kingdom: Animalia
- Phylum: Arthropoda
- Class: Insecta
- Order: Lepidoptera
- Family: Choreutidae
- Genus: Brenthia
- Species: B. melodica

Binomial name
- Brenthia melodica Meyrick, 1922

Species of moth

Brenthia melodica is a species of moth of the family Choreutidae. It was described by Edward Meyrick in 1922. It is found in Fiji.
