= Brenthia albimaculana =

Scientific classification
- Kingdom: Animalia
- Phylum: Arthropoda
- Class: Insecta
- Order: Lepidoptera
- Family: Choreutidae
- Genus: Brenthia
- Species: B. albimaculana

Binomial name
- Brenthia albimaculana (Snellen, 1875)

Synonyms
- Simaethis albimaculana Snellen, 1875; Brenthia hecataea Meyrick, 1907

Species of moth

Brenthia albimaculana is a species of moth of the family Choreutidae. It is found in Indonesia, New Guinea and Australia.
