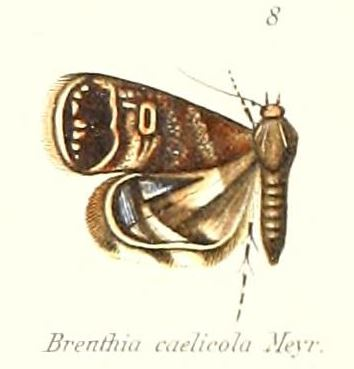

Scientific classification
- Kingdom: Animalia
- Phylum: Arthropoda
- Clade: Pancrustacea
- Class: Insecta
- Order: Lepidoptera
- Family: Choreutidae
- Genus: Brenthia
- Species: B. caelicola

Binomial name
- Brenthia caelicola Meyrick, 1910

= Brenthia caelicola =

Species of moth

Brenthia caelicola is a species of moth of the family Choreutidae. It was described by Edward Meyrick in 1910. It is found on the Kai Islands of Indonesia.

This species has a wingspan of 11–12 mm. The forewings are dark bronzy-fuscous with a straight thick transverse streak of whitish irroration at one-third and a similar thicker streak at two-thirds, but terminated above by an oblique streak of violet-golden-metallic irroration from the middle of the costa. The space between these irregularly marked with whitish irroration, and with a transverse-oval discal spot outlined with white.

There is a moderately broad blackish terminal fascia, edged with whitish irroration anteriorly, nearly divided into three spots by streaks of ground-colour from the anterior edge, the lowest spot largest, and marked just before the termen with an irregular series of seven partially connected violet-golden-metallic dots. The hindwings are dark fuscous with an oval white spot in the middle of the disc and a deep blue elongate spot beneath the costa beyond the middle. There is a similar transverse streak before the apex, as well as a white transverse streak before the central third of the termen, its lower extremity resting on the termen.
