= Litobrenthia japonica =

Scientific classification
- Kingdom: Animalia
- Phylum: Arthropoda
- Class: Insecta
- Order: Lepidoptera
- Family: Choreutidae
- Genus: Litobrenthia
- Species: L. japonica

Binomial name
- Litobrenthia japonica (Issiki, 1931)

Synonyms
- Brenthia japonica Issiki, 1931; Choreutis kiiensis Matsumura, 1931

Species of moth

Litobrenthia japonica is a moth in the family Choreutidae. It was described by Syuti Issiki in 1931. It is found in Japan and China (Zhejiang).

The larvae feed on Quercus acuta, Quercus gilva and Quercus myrsinaefolia.
