= Litobrenthia stephanephora =

Scientific classification
- Domain: Eukaryota
- Kingdom: Animalia
- Phylum: Arthropoda
- Class: Insecta
- Order: Lepidoptera
- Family: Choreutidae
- Genus: Litobrenthia
- Species: L. stephanephora

Binomial name
- Litobrenthia stephanephora Diakonoff, 1979

Species of moth

Litobrenthia stephanephora is a moth in the family Choreutidae. It was described by Alexey Diakonoff in 1979. It is found in Taiwan.
