= Brenthia leptocosma =

Scientific classification
- Kingdom: Animalia
- Phylum: Arthropoda
- Class: Insecta
- Order: Lepidoptera
- Family: Choreutidae
- Genus: Brenthia
- Species: B. leptocosma

Binomial name
- Brenthia leptocosma Meyrick, 1916

Species of moth

Brenthia leptocosma is a species of moth of the family Choreutidae. It is found on Mauritius and Réunion in the Indian Ocean.

This species has a wingspan of 8–9 mm, the head is bronzy-fuscous with a white line above the eyes. The thorax is bronzy-fuscous with five fine white longitudinal lines. The abdomen is dark fuscous. Forewings are elongate-triangular, costa gently arched, dark bronzy-fuscous, irregularly irrorated (speckled) with white and white dots on costa beyond. There is a series of eight small rounded-oblong spots round apex and termen, each centered with a violet-metallic dot. The hindwings are rather dark-fuscous, with a small oblique-oval whitish spot in the middle of the disc, a fine violet-blue-metallic line just before termen from apex to below middle, followed by three or four black spots.

This species is similar to Brenthia cyanaula in markings, but the palpi are quite different and characteristic.

Host plants of this species are Boraginaceae bushes, (mainly Cordia macrostachya but also Cordia myxa, Cordia abyssinica, and Cordia holstii). but also on Ehretia cymosa and Cordia africana. None of these species are native to Mauritius, nor Réunion.
