= Brenthia spintheristis =

Scientific classification
- Kingdom: Animalia
- Phylum: Arthropoda
- Class: Insecta
- Order: Lepidoptera
- Family: Choreutidae
- Genus: Brenthia
- Species: B. spintheristis

Binomial name
- Brenthia spintheristis Meyrick, 1910

Species of moth

Brenthia spintheristis is a species of moth of the family Choreutidae. It was described by Edward Meyrick in 1910. It is found on the Kei Islands of Indonesia.

This species has a wingspan of 11–12 mm. The forewings are dark fuscous with an obscure cloudy straight thick transverse streak of whitish irroration at one-fourth, sometimes little marked. A large undefined discal patch of pale violet-golden-metallic irroration is found above the middle reaching to the costa and there is a moderately broad pre-terminal blackish fascia obscurely edged all around with whitish suffusion, the upper end cut off to form a separate spot, marked near the posterior edge with five pale violet-golden-metallic dots, of which one is in the upper spot. The hindwings are dark fuscous with a small cloudy whitish spot in the disc before the middle and a thick whitish transverse streak at three-fourths abruptly constricted near each extremity. There is also a whitish submarginal line, touching the termen in the middle, towards the upper extremity attenuated and suffused with golden-violet, not quite reaching the costa.
