= Brenthia formosensis =

Scientific classification
- Kingdom: Animalia
- Phylum: Arthropoda
- Class: Insecta
- Order: Lepidoptera
- Family: Choreutidae
- Genus: Brenthia
- Species: B. formosensis

Binomial name
- Brenthia formosensis Issiki, 1931

Species of moth

Brenthia formosensis is a species of moth of the family Choreutidae. It was described by Syuti Issiki in 1931. It is found in Taiwan, Japan and on the Ryukyu Islands.
