= Brenthia moriutii =

Scientific classification
- Kingdom: Animalia
- Phylum: Arthropoda
- Clade: Pancrustacea
- Class: Insecta
- Order: Lepidoptera
- Family: Choreutidae
- Genus: Brenthia
- Species: B. moriutii

Binomial name
- Brenthia moriutii Arita, 1987

Species of moth

Brenthia moriutii is a species of moth of the family Choreutidae. It was described by Yutaka Arita in 1987. It is found in Japan.
