= Brenthia confluxana =

Scientific classification
- Kingdom: Animalia
- Phylum: Arthropoda
- Class: Insecta
- Order: Lepidoptera
- Family: Choreutidae
- Genus: Brenthia
- Species: B. confluxana

Binomial name
- Brenthia confluxana (Walker, 1863)

Synonyms
- Simaethis confluxana Walker, 1863

Species of moth

Brenthia confluxana is a moth of the family Choreutidae. It is known from Brazil, Trinidad, Cuba, Jamaica and Dominica.

The length of the forewings is 3.9–4.1 mm for males and 4-4.8 mm for females.
