= Pseudanarta pulverulenta =

Scientific classification
- Kingdom: Animalia
- Phylum: Arthropoda
- Clade: Pancrustacea
- Class: Insecta
- Order: Lepidoptera
- Superfamily: Noctuoidea
- Family: Noctuidae
- Tribe: Xylenini
- Genus: Pseudanarta
- Species: P. pulverulenta

Binomial name
- Pseudanarta pulverulenta (Smith, 1891)

Species of moth

Pseudanarta pulverulenta is a species of cutworm or dart moth in the family Noctuidae. It is found in North America.
