= Brenthia pileae =

Scientific classification
- Kingdom: Animalia
- Phylum: Arthropoda
- Clade: Pancrustacea
- Class: Insecta
- Order: Lepidoptera
- Family: Choreutidae
- Genus: Brenthia
- Species: B. pileae

Binomial name
- Brenthia pileae Arita, 1971

Species of moth

Brenthia pileae is a species of moth of the family Choreutidae. It was described by Yutaka Arita in 1971. It is found in Japan and Taiwan.

The larvae feed on Pilea petiolaris pseudopetiolaris.
