= Brenthia gregori =

Scientific classification
- Kingdom: Animalia
- Phylum: Arthropoda
- Clade: Pancrustacea
- Class: Insecta
- Order: Lepidoptera
- Family: Choreutidae
- Genus: Brenthia
- Species: B. gregori

Binomial name
- Brenthia gregori Heppner, 1985

Species of moth

Brenthia gregori is a moth of the family Choreutidae. It is known from Cuba and the Virgin Islands.

The length of the forewings is about 5.5 mm.[0.55 cm]
