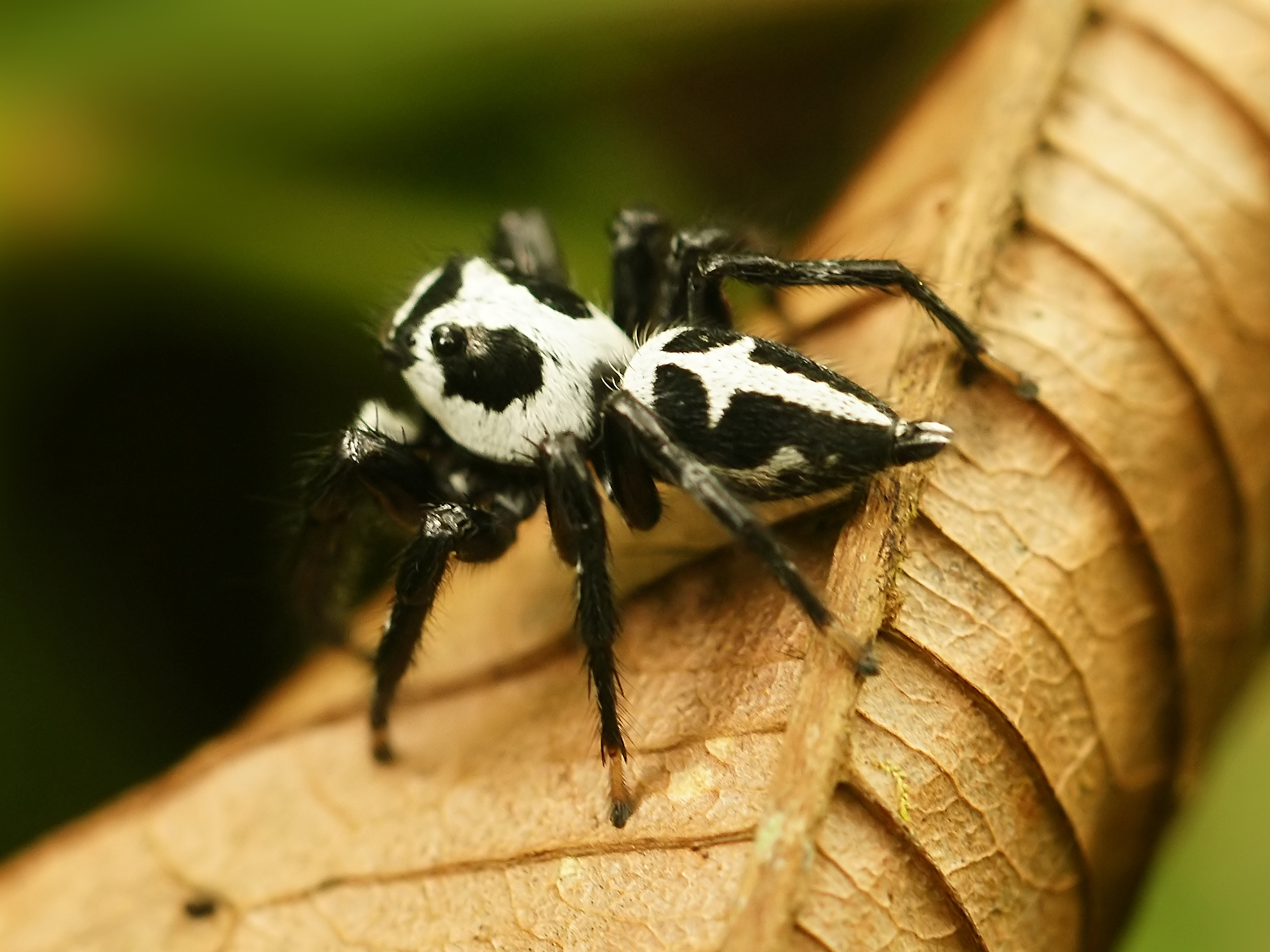

Scientific classification
- Kingdom: Animalia
- Phylum: Arthropoda
- Subphylum: Chelicerata
- Class: Arachnida
- Order: Araneae
- Infraorder: Araneomorphae
- Family: Salticidae
- Genus: Phiale
- Species: P. formosa

Binomial name
- Phiale formosa (Banks, 1909)

= Phiale formosa =

Species of spider

Phiale formosa is a species of spider in the family Salticidae (jumping spiders). It is found in Costa Rica.
