= Brenthia gamicopis =

Scientific classification
- Kingdom: Animalia
- Phylum: Arthropoda
- Class: Insecta
- Order: Lepidoptera
- Family: Choreutidae
- Genus: Brenthia
- Species: B. gamicopis

Binomial name
- Brenthia gamicopis Meyrick, 1930

Species of moth

Brenthia gamicopis is a species of moth of the family Choreutidae. It is found in Uganda.
