= Brenthia cubana =

Scientific classification
- Kingdom: Animalia
- Phylum: Arthropoda
- Clade: Pancrustacea
- Class: Insecta
- Order: Lepidoptera
- Family: Choreutidae
- Genus: Brenthia
- Species: B. cubana

Binomial name
- Brenthia cubana Heppner, 1985

Species of moth

Brenthia cubana is a moth of the family Choreutidae. It is known from Cuba.

The length of the forewings is about 3.5 mm.
