= Brenthia hibiscusae =

Scientific classification
- Kingdom: Animalia
- Phylum: Arthropoda
- Clade: Pancrustacea
- Class: Insecta
- Order: Lepidoptera
- Family: Choreutidae
- Genus: Brenthia
- Species: B. hibiscusae

Binomial name
- Brenthia hibiscusae Heppner, 1985

Species of moth

Brenthia hibiscusae is a moth of the family Choreutidae. It is known from Cuba, Puerto Rico and Venezuela.

The length of the forewings is about 3.6 mm for males and 3.8-4.1 for females. It has a prominent white spot in the black terminal field of the forewing.

The larvae feed on Hibiscus sabdariffa.
