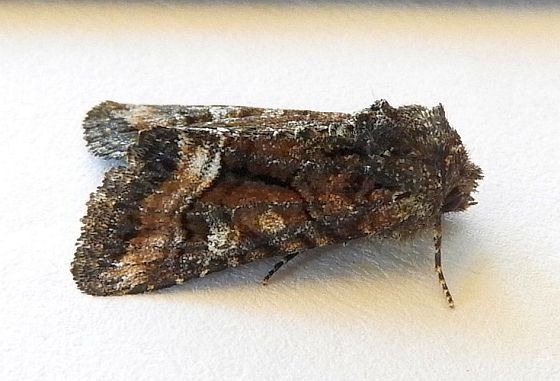
- Pseudonarta actura

Scientific classification
- Kingdom: Animalia
- Phylum: Arthropoda
- Clade: Pancrustacea
- Class: Insecta
- Order: Lepidoptera
- Superfamily: Noctuoidea
- Family: Noctuidae
- Subfamily: Xyleninae
- Tribe: Xylenini
- Genus: Pseudanarta; Grote, 1878

= Pseudanarta =

Genus of moths

Pseudanarta is a genus of moths in the family Noctuidae.

== Species ==
- Pseudanarta actura Smith, 1908
- Pseudanarta basivirida (Barnes & McDunnough, 1911)
- Pseudanarta caeca Dod, 1913
- Pseudanarta crocea (H. Edwards, 1875)
- Pseudanarta daemonalis Franclemont, 1941
- Pseudanarta damnata Franclemont, 1941
- Pseudanarta exasperata Franclemont, 1941
- Pseudanarta flava (Grote, 1874)
- Pseudanarta flavidens (Grote, 1879)
- Pseudanarta heterochroa Dyar, 112
- Pseudanarta perplexa Franclemont, 1941
- Pseudanarta pulverulenta (Smith, 1891)
- Pseudanarta singula (Grote, 1880)
- Pseudanarta vexata Franclemont, 1941
