= Brenthia octogemmifera =

Scientific classification
- Kingdom: Animalia
- Phylum: Arthropoda
- Class: Insecta
- Order: Lepidoptera
- Family: Choreutidae
- Genus: Brenthia
- Species: B. octogemmifera

Binomial name
- Brenthia octogemmifera Walsingham, 1897

Species of moth

Brenthia octogemmifera is a species of moth of the family Choreutidae. It is found in the Republic of Congo, Equatorial Guinea and Nigeria.
