= Brenthia carola =

Scientific classification
- Kingdom: Animalia
- Phylum: Arthropoda
- Clade: Pancrustacea
- Class: Insecta
- Order: Lepidoptera
- Family: Choreutidae
- Genus: Brenthia
- Species: B. carola

Binomial name
- Brenthia carola Meyrick, 1912

Synonyms
- Litobrenthia carola

Species of moth

Brenthia carola is a species of moth of the family Choreutidae. It was described by Edward Meyrick in 1912. It is found in Assam, India.
