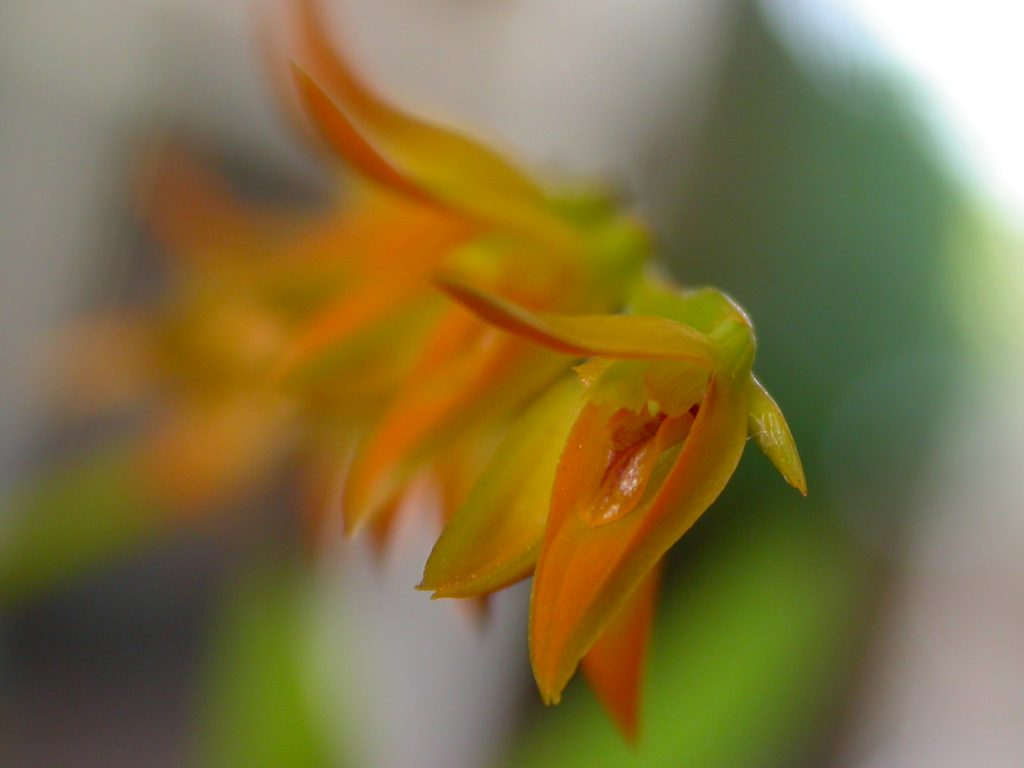

Scientific classification
- Kingdom: Plantae
- Clade: Tracheophytes
- Clade: Angiosperms
- Clade: Monocots
- Order: Asparagales
- Family: Orchidaceae
- Subfamily: Epidendroideae
- Genus: Acianthera
- Species: A. glumacea

Binomial name
- Acianthera glumacea (Lindl.) Pridgeon & M.W. Chase (2001)

Synonyms
- Pleurothallis glumacea Lindl. (1836) (Basionym); Pleurothallis crocea Barb.Rodr. 1881); Humboldtia glumacea (Lindl.) Kuntze (1891); Pleurothallis glaziovii Cogn. (1896); Pleurothallis vitellina Porsch (1905); Pleurothallis alexandrae Schltr. (1922)

= Acianthera glumacea =

Species of orchid

Acianthera glumacea is a species of orchid.
