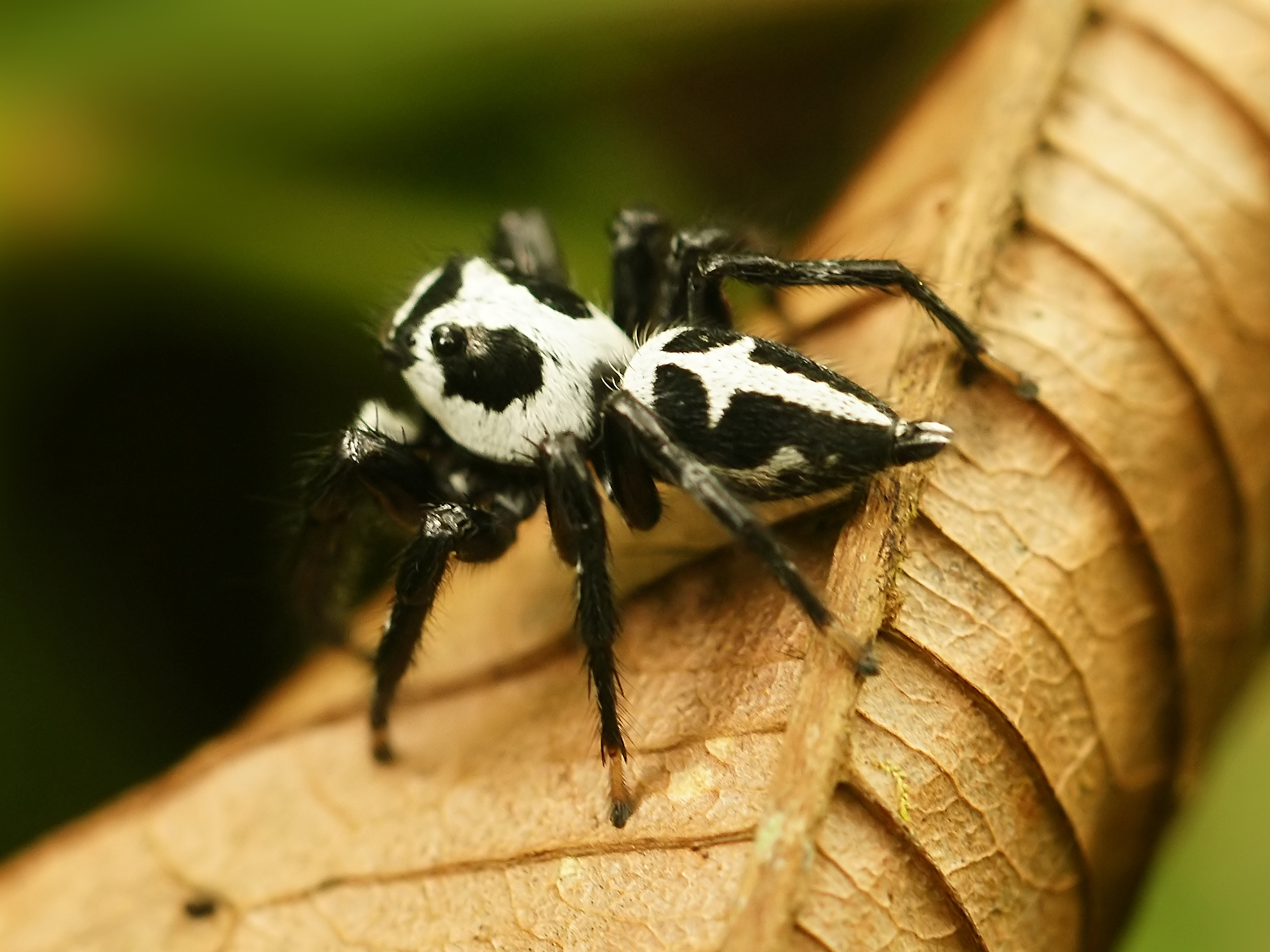
- P. formosa
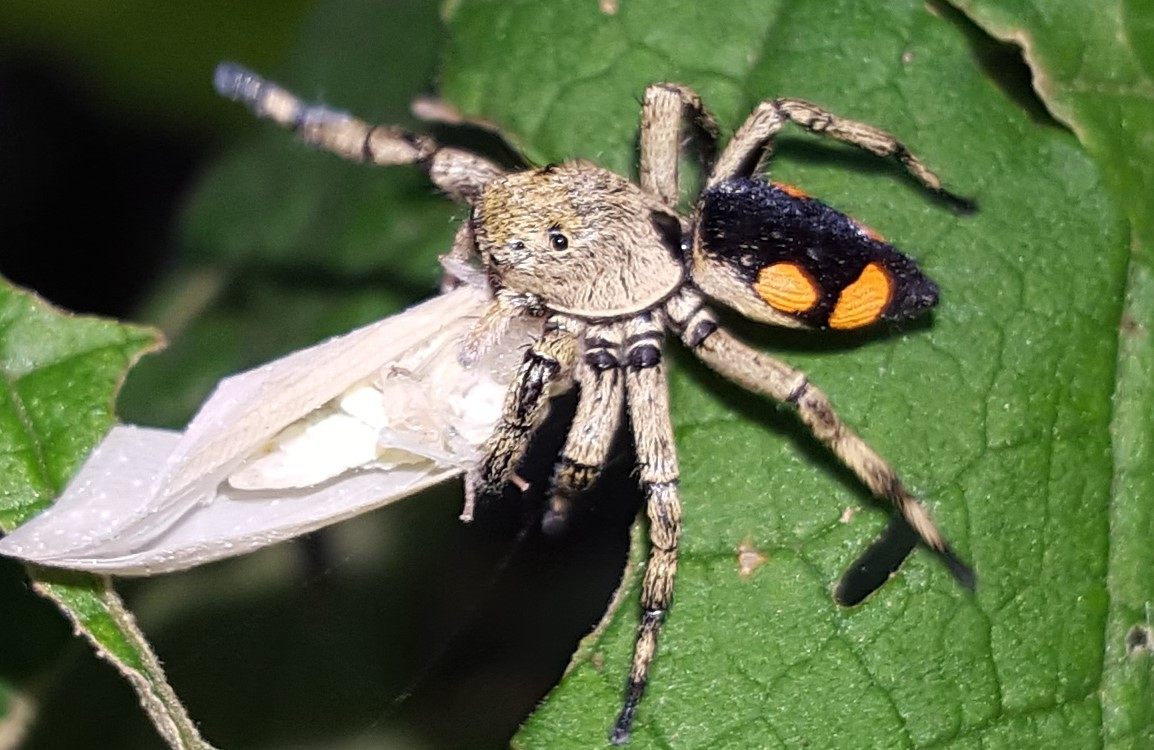
- female P. gratiosa

Scientific classification
- Kingdom: Animalia
- Phylum: Arthropoda
- Subphylum: Chelicerata
- Class: Arachnida
- Order: Araneae
- Infraorder: Araneomorphae
- Family: Salticidae
- Subfamily: Salticinae
- Genus: Phiale; C. L. Koch, 1846

Type species
- P. gratiosa C. L. Koch, 1846

Species
- 25, see text

= Phiale (spider) =

Genus of spiders

Phiale is a genus of jumping spiders that was first described by Carl Ludwig Koch in 1846.

== Species ==
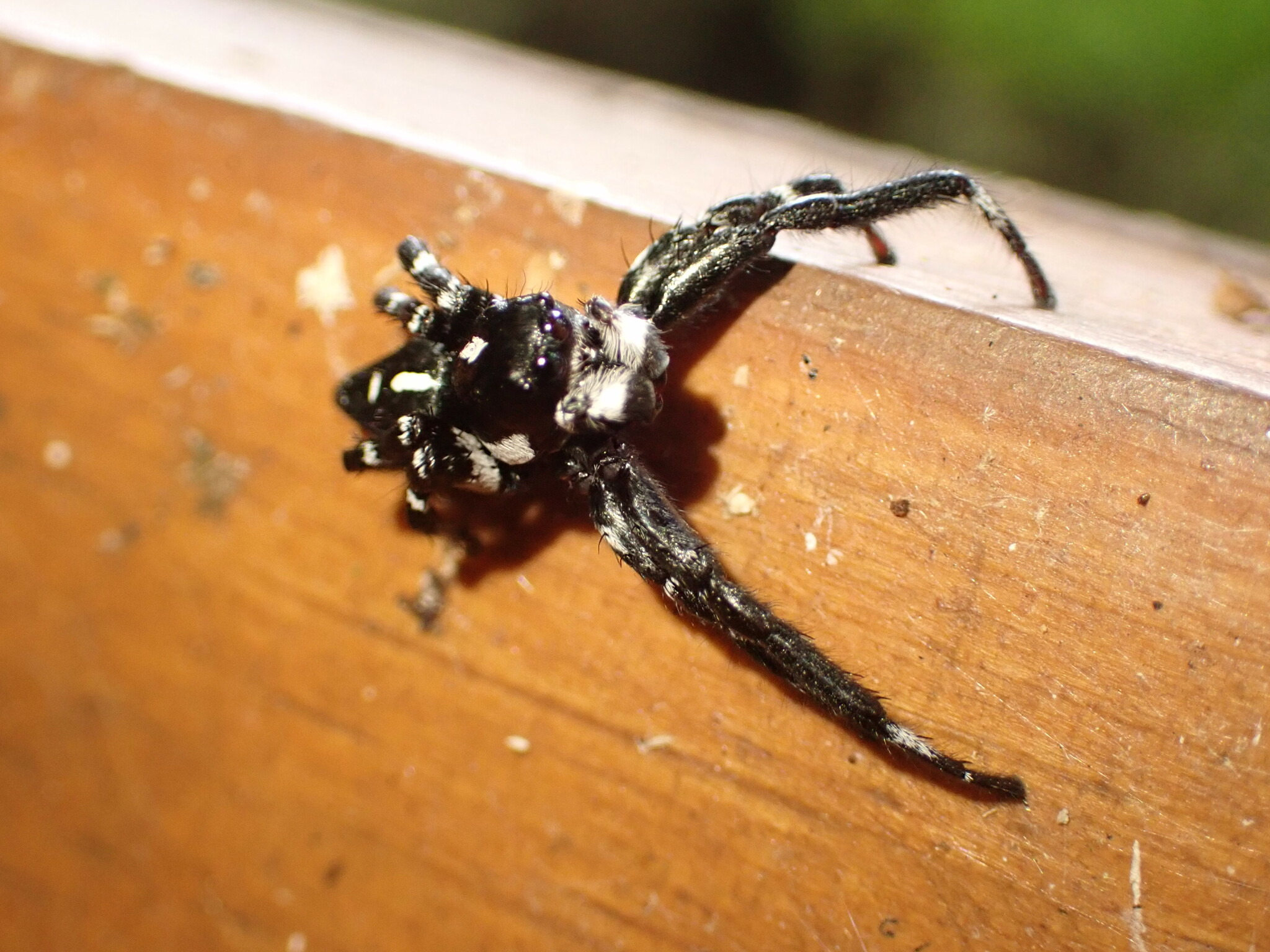
male P. guttata

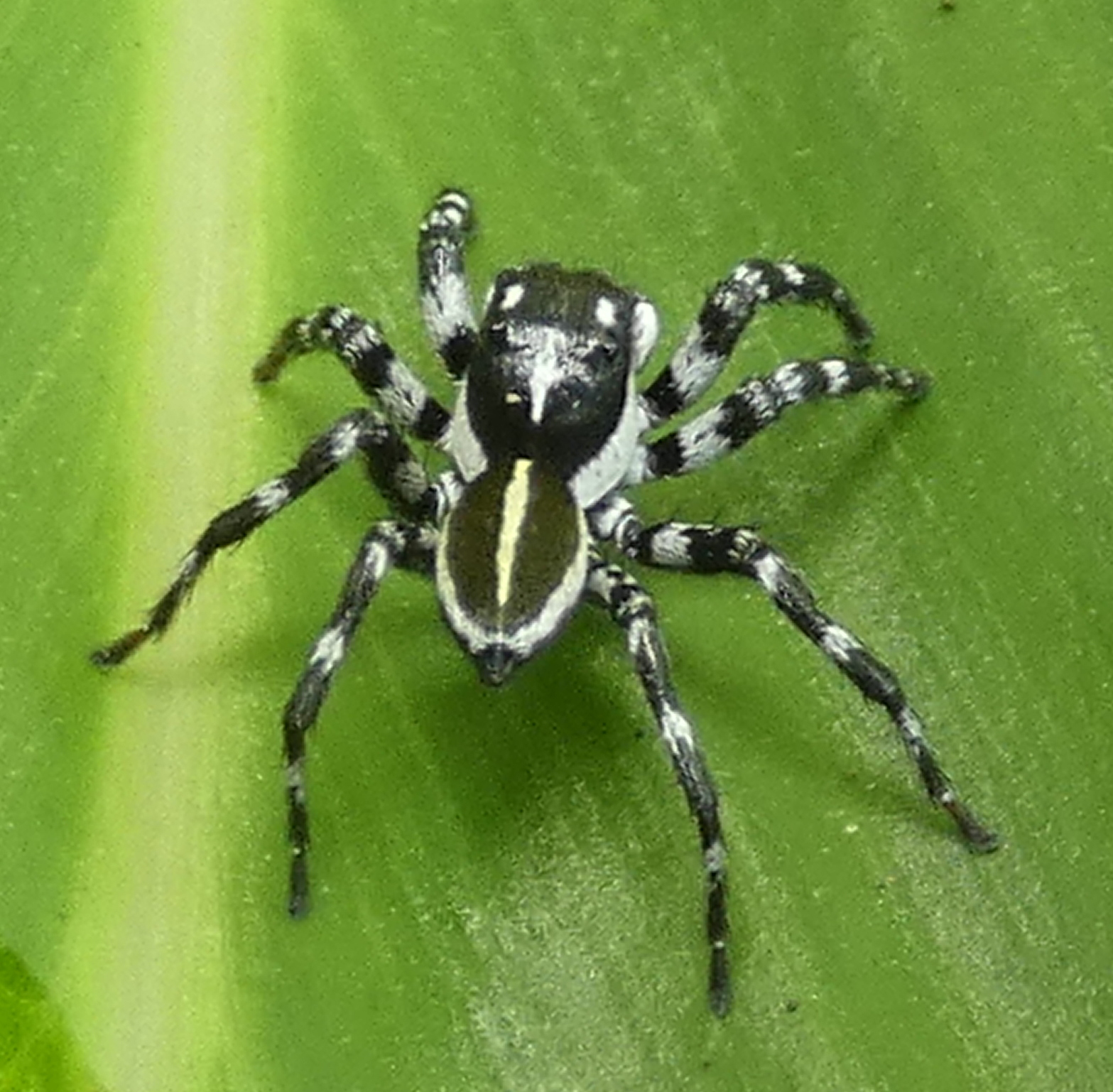
male P. crocea

female P. mimica

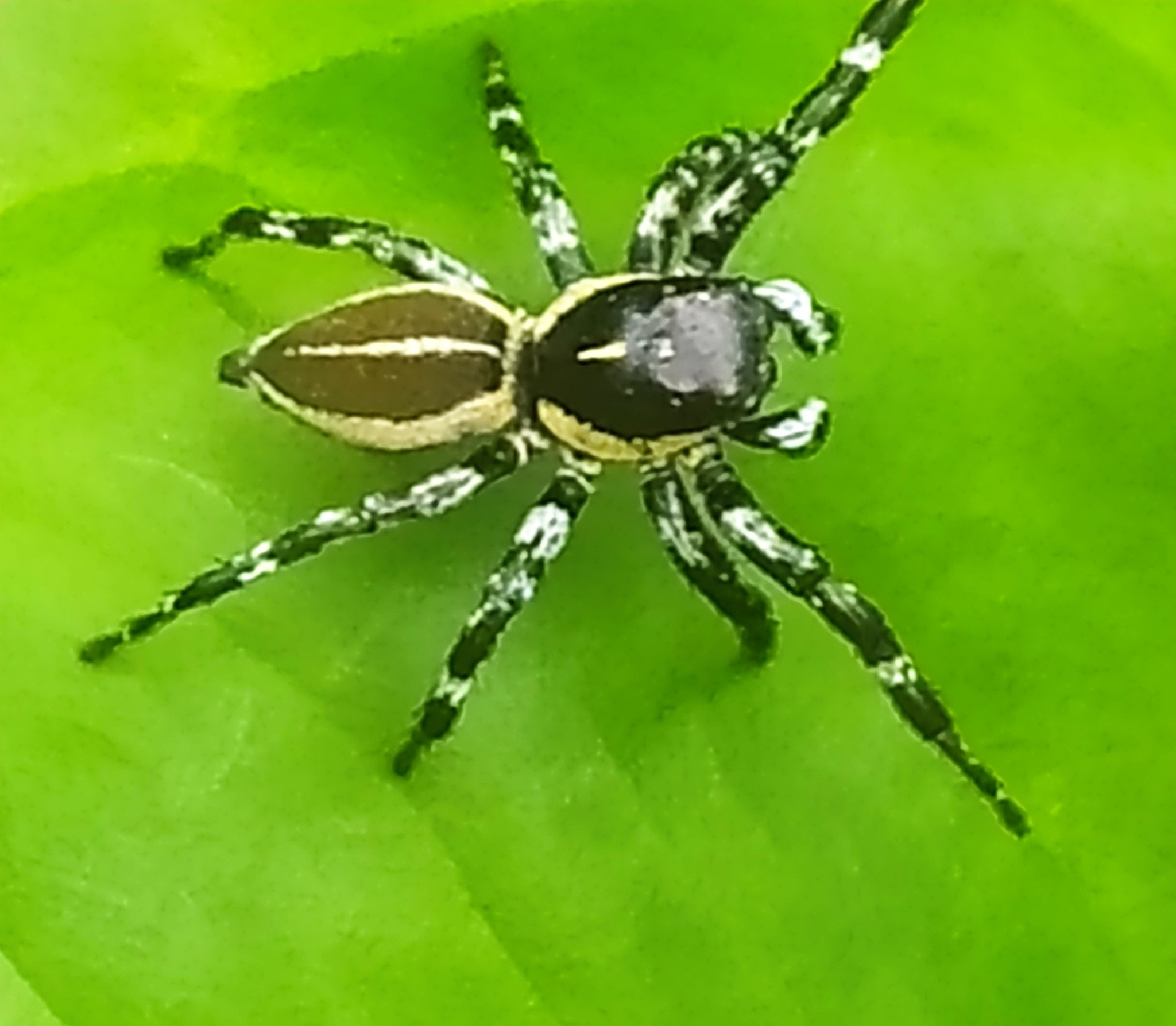
male P. tristis

As of August 2019 it contains twenty-five species, found in the Caribbean, South America, Costa Rica, Guatemala, Mexico, and Panama:

- Phiale aschnae Makhan, 2006 – Suriname
- Phiale bipunctata Mello-Leitão, 1947 – Brazil
- Phiale bisignata (F. O. Pickard-Cambridge, 1901) – Mexico, Guatemala
- Phiale bryantae Roewer, 1951 – Antigua and Barbuda (Antigua)
- Phiale bulbosa (F. O. Pickard-Cambridge, 1901) – Panama
- Phiale crocea C. L. Koch, 1846 – Panama to Brazil
- Phiale cruentata (Walckenaer, 1837) – Brazil, French Guiana
- Phiale cubana Roewer, 1951 – Cuba
- Phiale elegans (F. O. Pickard-Cambridge, 1901) – Panama
- Phiale formosa (Banks, 1909) – Costa Rica
- Phiale geminata (F. O. Pickard-Cambridge, 1901) – Panama
- Phiale gratiosa C. L. Koch, 1846 (type) – Brazil, Paraguay, Argentina
- Phiale guttata (C. L. Koch, 1846) – Costa Rica to Paraguay
- Phiale huadquinae Chamberlin, 1916 – Peru
- Phiale longibarba (Mello-Leitão, 1943) – Brazil
- Phiale mimica (C. L. Koch, 1846) – Brazil
- Phiale ortrudae Galiano, 1981 – Ecuador
- Phiale pallida (F. O. Pickard-Cambridge, 1901) – Guatemala
- Phiale quadrimaculata (Walckenaer, 1837) – Brazil
- Phiale radians (Blackwall, 1862) – Brazil
- Phiale roburifoliata Holmberg, 1875 – Argentina
- Phiale rubriceps (Taczanowski, 1871) – French Guiana
- Phiale septemguttata (Taczanowski, 1871) – French Guiana
- Phiale tristis Mello-Leitão, 1945 – Argentina, Paraguay, Brazil
- Phiale virgo C. L. Koch, 1846 – Suriname

P. albovittata has been considered a junior synonym of Freya perelegans since 2006.
