= Zodia chrysosperma =

Scientific classification
- Kingdom: Animalia
- Phylum: Arthropoda
- Class: Insecta
- Order: Lepidoptera
- Family: Choreutidae
- Genus: Zodia
- Species: Z. chrysosperma

Binomial name
- Zodia chrysosperma (Meyrick, 1931)

Synonyms
- Brenthia chrysosperma Meyrick, 1931

Species of moth

Zodia chrysosperma is a moth of the family Choreutidae. It is known from Brazil.
