= Zodia ochripalpis =

Scientific classification
- Kingdom: Animalia
- Phylum: Arthropoda
- Class: Insecta
- Order: Lepidoptera
- Family: Choreutidae
- Genus: Zodia
- Species: Z. ochripalpis

Binomial name
- Zodia ochripalpis (Meyrick, 1920)

Synonyms
- Brenthia ochripalpis Meyrick, 1920

Species of moth

Zodia ochripalpis is a moth of the family Choreutidae. It is known from Brazil.
