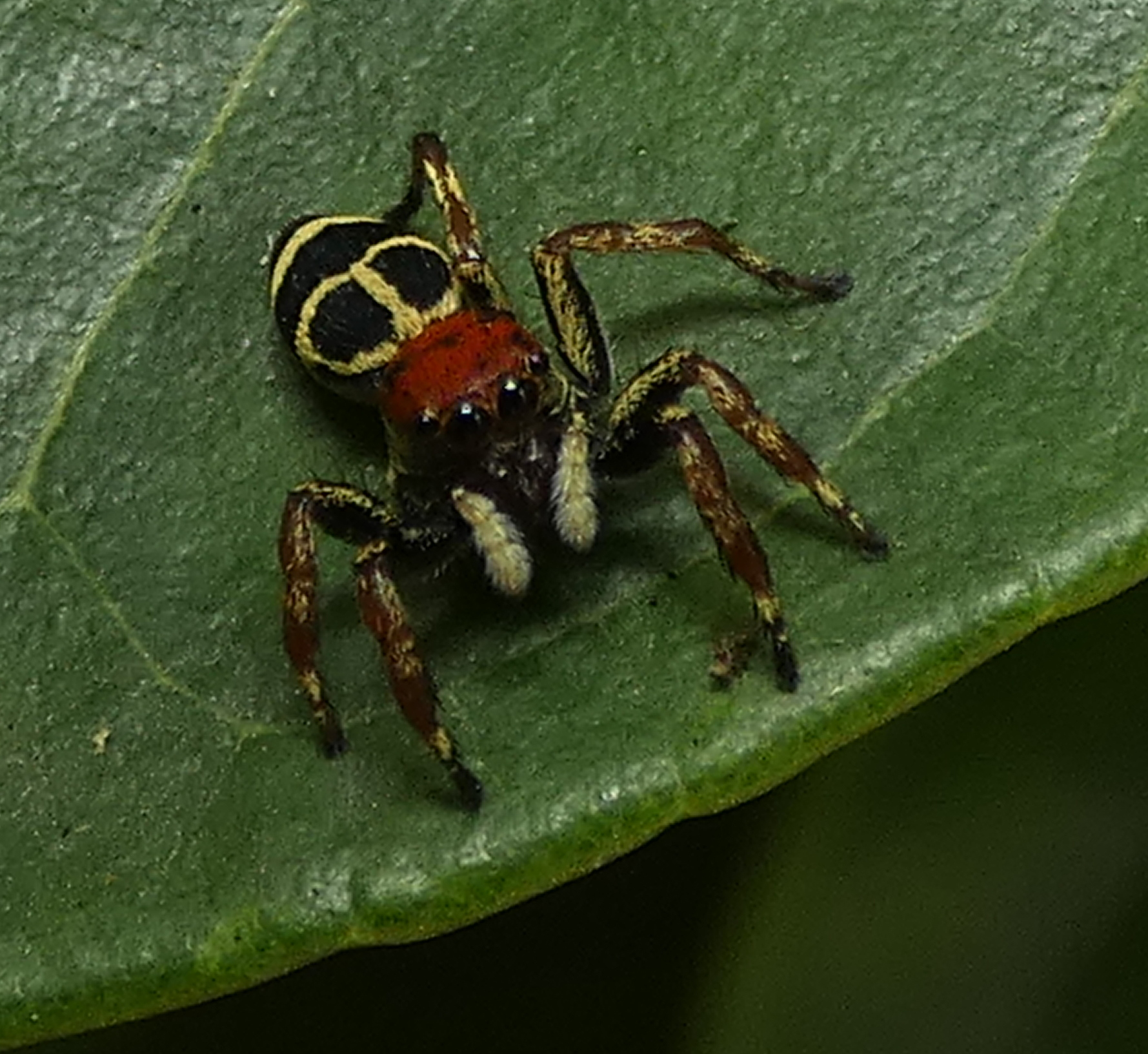
- Female from Brazil
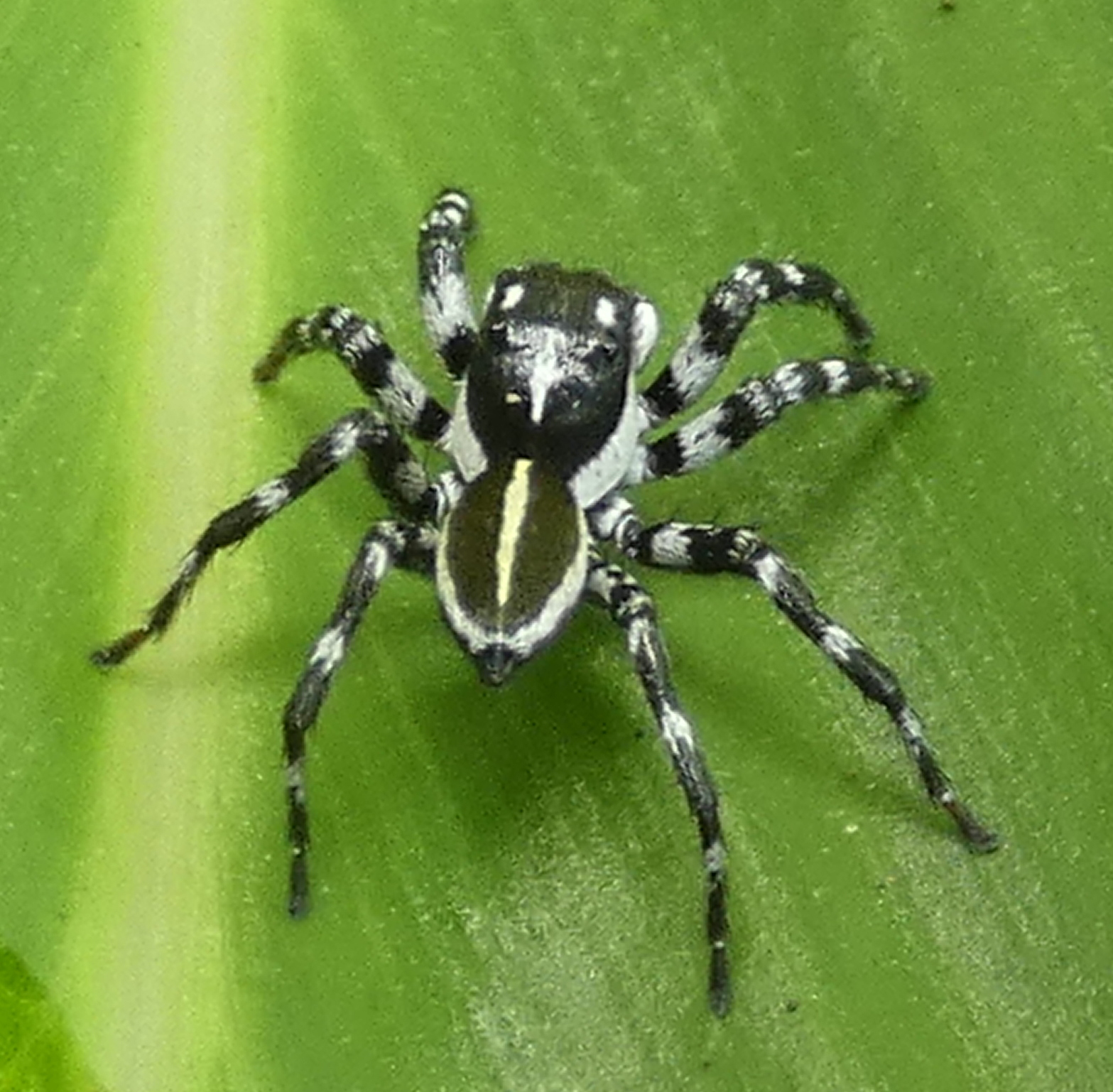
- male from Brazil

Scientific classification
- Kingdom: Animalia
- Phylum: Arthropoda
- Subphylum: Chelicerata
- Class: Arachnida
- Order: Araneae
- Infraorder: Araneomorphae
- Family: Salticidae
- Genus: Phiale
- Species: P. crocea

Binomial name
- Phiale crocea C. L. Koch, 1846

Synonyms
- Attus obscurus Taczanowski, 1871; Euophrys obscurus (Taczanowski, 1871); Chira luctuosa Simon, 1902; Phiale zonata Caporiacco, 1947; Akela obscura Caporiacco, 1948

= Phiale crocea =

Species of spider

Phiale crocea is a species of spider in the jumping spider family (Salticidae). It was first described by German arachnologist Carl Ludwig Koch in 1846. It is part of a group of allied species also found in Central America, see under Phiale mimica for details of the wider "mimica species group" within the genus Phiale.

== Taxonomy ==
The species has a complex taxonomic history with several synonyms. In 1981, María Elena Galiano conducted a comprehensive revision of the genus Phiale and synonymized several species with P. crocea, including Chira luctuosa Simon, 1902, Euophrys obscurus Taczanowski, 1871, and Phiale zonata Caporiacco, 1947.

== Distribution ==
P. crocea has a wide distribution across the Neotropical region, ranging from Panama in the north to Brazil in the south. The species has been recorded from several countries including French Guiana, Guyana, and Suriname.

== Description ==
Koch's original drawing of female

Based on Koch's original description, the female is approximately 3 1/8 lines (about 7 mm) in length. The species exhibits sexual dimorphism with distinct coloration patterns between males and females.

The female has an orange-red cephalothorax (front part of the body) with a black plate on the forehead and dark legs. The abdomen is fire-red with yellowish coloration on the underside, while the entire back area is deep black. The chelicerae (mouthparts) are rust-red, becoming brownish at the tips, and the palps are brownish-yellow with fine black tips. The legs are orange-red with black-brown tarsi (feet), and the femora and tibiae are yellow with fine black markings.
