= Brenthia coronigera =

Scientific classification
- Kingdom: Animalia
- Phylum: Arthropoda
- Class: Insecta
- Order: Lepidoptera
- Family: Choreutidae
- Genus: Brenthia
- Species: B. coronigera

Binomial name
- Brenthia coronigera Meyrick, 1918

Species of moth

Brenthia coronigera, commonly known as the metalmark moth, is a species of moth of the family Choreutidae. It was described by Edward Meyrick in 1918 and has a wingspan of 8mm. It is found in the Bengal region of what was British India.

The adult moth is a mimic of predatory jumping spiders; the moth's forewings are held aloft and have bold black spots, which resemble spider eyes, while its hindwings, which are held in a twisted position and are marked with stripes, resemble spider legs. The moth also moves in a jumpy, jerky fashion, like a jumping spider, rather than fluttering like other moths. Its mimicry is so convincing that spiders respond by trying to court the moth, rather than attacking it.

The larvae feed on Cordia obliqua and Cordia myxa.
