= Litobrenthia luminifera =

Scientific classification
- Kingdom: Animalia
- Phylum: Arthropoda
- Class: Insecta
- Order: Lepidoptera
- Family: Choreutidae
- Genus: Litobrenthia
- Species: L. luminifera

Binomial name
- Litobrenthia luminifera (Meyrick, 1912)

Synonyms
- Brenthia luminifera Meyrick, 1912

Species of moth

Litobrenthia luminifera is a moth in the family Choreutidae. It was described by Edward Meyrick in 1912. It is found in Assam, India.
