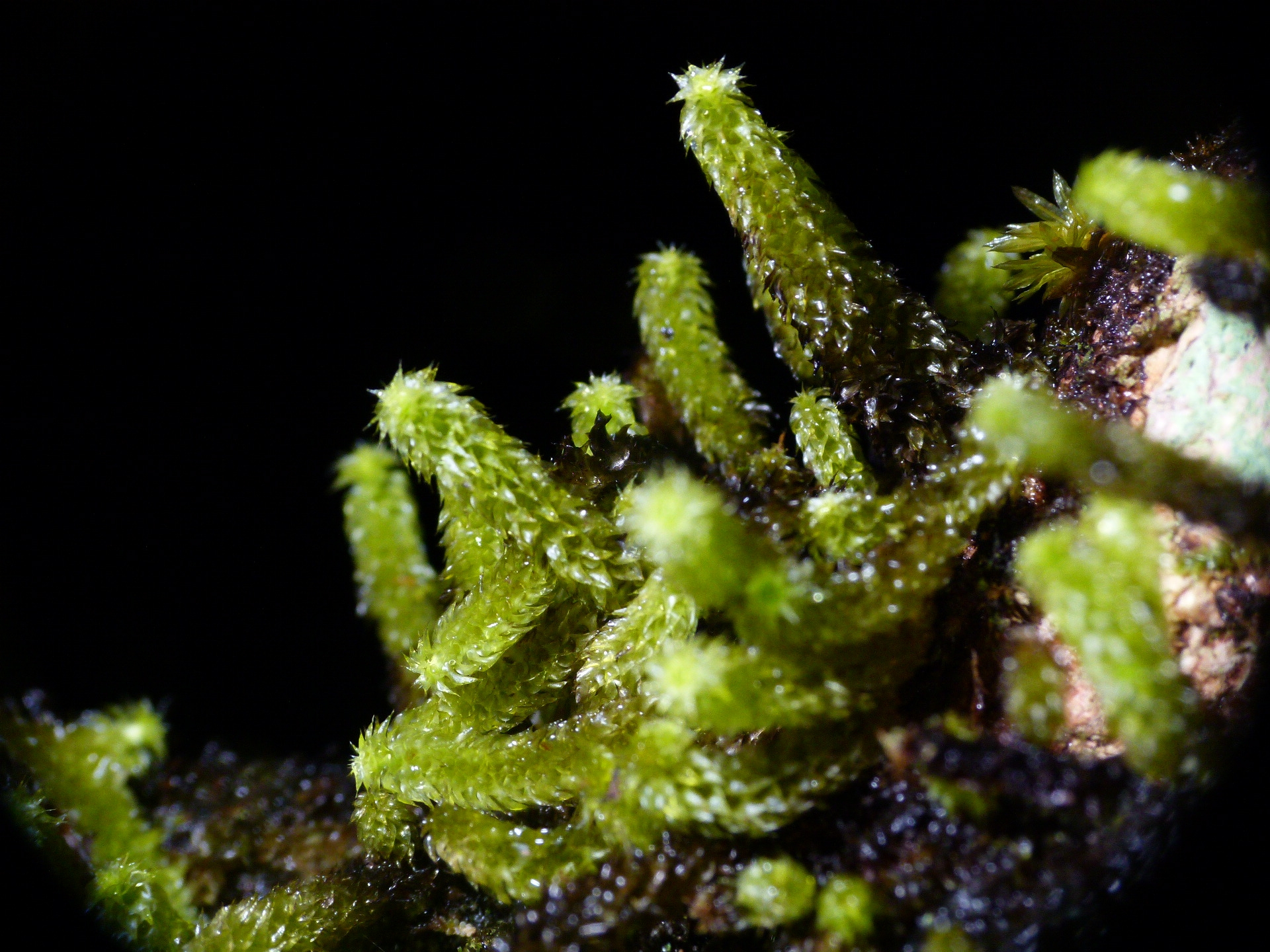
- Meteoriopsis reclinata

Scientific classification
- Kingdom: Plantae
- Division: Bryophyta
- Class: Bryopsida
- Subclass: Bryidae
- Order: Hypnales
- Family: Meteoriaceae; Kindb.

Genera
- See text

= Meteoriaceae =

Family of mosses

Meteoriaceae is a family of mosses from the order Hypnales. There are about 22 genera and 171 species represented by the family.

== Description ==
Characteristic traits of the family include creeping stems with pendent branches, elongate, mostly papillose laminal cells, and pointed leaves. The taxonomy and phylogenetic relationships of this complex group of mosses are difficult to interpret, and attempts to structure the taxon are ongoing.

== Distribution ==
Meteoriaceae species are found in warm topical and subtropical regions worldwide. Their primary substrate is on twigs and bark.

== Classification ==
Meteoriaceae was originally classified under in the order Leucodontales but are now within the Hypnales. The family contains the following genera:

- Aerobryidium M.Fleisch. ex Broth.
- Aerobryopsis M.Fleisch.
- Barbella M.Fleisch. ex Broth.
- Barbellopsis Broth.
- Chrysocladium M.Fleisch.
- Cryptopapillaria M.Menzel
- Diaphanodon Renauld & Cardot
- Duthiella Müll.Hal. ex Broth.
- Floribundaria M.Fleisch.
- Lepyrodontopsis Broth.
- Meteoriopsis M.Fleisch. ex Broth.
- Meteorium Dozy & Molk.
- Neodicladiella (Nog.) W.R.Buck
- Neonoguchia S.H.Lin
- Papillaria (Müll.Hal.) Lorentz
- Pseudospiridentopsis (Broth.) M.Fleisch.
- Pseudotrachypus P.de la Varde & Thér.
- Sinskea W.R.Buck
- Toloxis W.R.Buck
- Trachycladiella (M.Fleisch.) M.Menzel
- Trachypodopsis M.Fleisch.
- Trachypus Reinw. & Hornsch.
