= Pseudanarta crocea =

Scientific classification
- Domain: Eukaryota
- Kingdom: Animalia
- Phylum: Arthropoda
- Class: Insecta
- Order: Lepidoptera
- Superfamily: Noctuoidea
- Family: Noctuidae
- Genus: Pseudanarta
- Species: P. crocea

Binomial name
- Pseudanarta crocea H. Edwards, 1875

Synonyms
- Anarta crocea

Species of moth

Pseudanarta crocea is a moth of the family Noctuidae. It is found from Saskatchewan, Alberta and British Columbia south through Colorado and Utah to California, and Arizona.

The wingspan is about 22 mm.
