= Brenthia cyanaula =

Scientific classification
- Kingdom: Animalia
- Phylum: Arthropoda
- Class: Insecta
- Order: Lepidoptera
- Family: Choreutidae
- Genus: Brenthia
- Species: B. cyanaula

Binomial name
- Brenthia cyanaula Meyrick, 1912

Synonyms
- Litobrenthia cyanaula

Species of moth

Brenthia cyanaula is a species of moth of the family Choreutidae. It was described by Edward Meyrick in 1912. It is found in Sri Lanka.
