= List of moths of Japan (Choreutoidea-Thyridoidea) =

Partial list of Japanese moths

This is a list of the Japanese species of the superfamilies Choreutoidea, Schreckensteinioidea, Epermenioidea, Alucitoidea, Pterophoroidea, Immoidea, Hyblaeoidea, Copromorphoidea and Thyridoidea. It also acts as an index to the species articles and forms part of the full List of moths of Japan.

== Choreutidae ==
- イラクサハマキモドキ — Anthophila fabriciana (Linnaeus, 1767)
- アコウハマキモドキ — Choreutis achyrodes (Meyrick, 1912)
- 和名未定 — Choreutis amethystodes (Meyrick, 1914)
- ニレハマキモドキ — Choreutis atrosignata (Christoph, 1888)
- オオキオビハマキモドキ — Choreutis basalis (Felder & Rogenhofer, 1875)
- ハスオビハマキモドキ — Choreutis cunuligera (Diakonoff, 1978)
- 和名未定 — Choreutis cyanogramma (Diakonoff & Arita, 1979)
- ダイアナハマキモドキ — Choreutis diana (Hübner, [1822])
- ハガタオビハマキモドキ — Choreutis fulminea (Meyrick, 1912)
- コウゾハマキモドキ — Choreutis hyligenes (Butler, 1879)
- イヌビワハマキモドキ — Choreutis japonica (Zeller, 1877)
- チビハマキモドキ — Choreutis minuta (Diakonoff & Arita, 1979)
- ガジュマルハマキモドキ — Choreutis ophiosema (Lower, 1896)
- ニセリンゴハマキモドキ — Choreutis pariana (Clerck, [1764])
- リンゴハマキモドキ — Choreutis vinosa discolor (Diakonoff & Arita, 1979)
- キオビハマキモドキ — Choreutis xanthogramma (Meyrick, 1912)
- ヤナギイチゴハマキモドキ — Choreutis yakushimensis (Marumo, 1923)
- ミヤマハマキモドキ — Prochoreutis alpina (Arita, 1976)
- 和名未定 — Prochoreutis brunescens (Diakonoff, 1978)
- アトギンボシハマキモドキ — Prochoreutis delicata (Arita, 1976)
- コアトギンボシハマキモドキ — Prochoreutis diakonoffi Arita, 1985
- ニセアトギンボシハマキモドキ — Prochoreutis hadrogastra (Diakonoff, 1978)
- クロコギンボシハマキモドキ — Prochoreutis kurokoi Arita, 1987
- シロヘリハマキモドキ — Prochoreutis myllerana (Fabricius, 1794)
- アトシロスジハマキモドキ — Prochoreutis sehestediana (Fabricius, 1776)
- シロオビハマキモドキ — Prochoreutis solaris (Erschoff, 1877)
- イワテギンボシハマキモドキ — Prochoreutis subdelicata Arita, 1987
- ギンスジハマキモドキ — Prochoreutis ultimana (Krulikowsky, 1909)
- ギンボシハマキモドキ — Tebenna bjerkandrella (Thunberg, 1784)
- ゴボウハマキモドキ — Tebenna micalis (Mann, 1857)
- ヤマハハコハマキモドキ — Tebenna submicalis Danilevsky, 1969
- 和名未定 — Tebenna yamashitai Arita, 1987
- ミドリオオハマキモドキ — Saptha beryllitis (Meyrick, 1910)
- イヌビワオオハマキモドキ — Saptha divitiosa Walker, 1864
- オドリハマキモドキ — Litobrenthia japonica (Issiki, 1930)
- タイワンオドリハマキモドキ — Brenthia formosensis Issiki, 1930
- モリウチオドリハマキモドキ — Brenthia moriutii Arita, 1987
- コミヤマミズオドリハマキモドキ — Brenthia pileae Arita, 1971
- ヤエヤマオドリハマキモドキ — Brenthia yaeyamae Arita, 1971

== Schreckensteiniidae ==
- タテジマホソマイコガ — Schreckensteinia festaliella (Hübner, [1819])

== Epermeniidae ==
- ウスグロヒメササベリガ — Phaulernis chasanica Gaedike, 1993
- キモンクロササベリガ — Phaulernis fulviguttella (Zeller, 1839)
- トサカササベリガ — Phaulernis pulchra Gaedike, 1993
- チャマダラササベリガ — Epermenia fuscomaculata Kuroko & Gaedike, 2006
- シベチャササベリガ — Epermenia ijimai Kuroko & Gaedike, 2006
- トベラササベリガ — Epermenia muraseae Gaedike & Kuroko, 2000
- ニセチャマダラササベリガ — Epermenia pseudofuscomaculata Kuroko & Gaedike, 2006
- ウスチャオオササベリガ — Epermenia shimekii Kuroko & Gaedike, 2006
- シシウドササベリガ — Epermenia sinjovi Gaedike, 1993
- ハイイロオオササベリガ — Epermenia strictella (Wocke, 1867)
- シロオビササベリガ — Epermenia sugisimai Kuroko & Gaedike, 2006
- ヒメササベリガ — Epermenia thailandica Gaedike, 1987
- ニセトベラササベリガ — Epermenia uedai Kuroko & Gaedike, 2006

== Alucitidae ==
- アヤニジュウシトリバ — Alucita flavofascia (Inoue, 1958)
- ヤマトニジュウシトリバ — Alucita japonica (Matsumura, 1931)
- 和名未定 — Alucita pusilla Hashimoto, 1984
- ニジュウシトリバ — Alucita spilodesma (Meyrick, 1908)
- 和名未定 — Alucita straminea Hashimoto, 1984

== Pterophoridae ==
- ジャンボトリバ — Agdistopis sinhala (T. B. Fletcher, 1909)
- タカムクシロトリバ — Agdistis takamukui Nohira, 1919
- サツマイモトリバ — Ochyrotica yanoi Arenberger, 1988
- シラホシトリバ — Deuterocopus albipunctatus T. B. Fletcher, 1910
- タイワンシラホシトリバ — Deuterocopus socotranus Rebel, 1907
- ミカドトリバ — Tetraschalis mikado (Hori, 1933)
- アイノトリバ — Platyptilia ainonis Matsumura, 1931
- トビモントリバ — Platyptilia cretalis (Meyrick, 1908)
- エゾギクトリバ — Platyptilia farfarella (Zeller, 1867)
- ブドウオオトリバ — Platyptilia ignifera Meyrick, 1908
- 和名未定 — Platyptilia isodactyla (Zeller, 1852)
- ミヤマトリバ — Platyptilia montana Yano, 1963
- オオミヤマトリバ — Platyptilia nemoralis (Zeller, 1841)
- ハネビロトリバ — Platyptilia profunda Yano, 1963
- チビトビモントリバ — Bipunctiphorus dissipata (Yano, 1963)
- 和名未定 — Gillmeria melanoschista (T. B. Fletcher, 1940)
- カラフトトリバ — Gillmeria pallidactyla (Haworth, 1811)
- ハネナガトリバ — Gillmeria scutata (Yano, 1961)
- トキンソウトリバ — Stenoptilodes taprobanes (Felder & Rogenhofer, 1875)
- クロマダラトリバ — Asiaephorus longicucullus Gielis, 2000
- マエクロモンオオトリバ — Stenoptilia admiranda Yano, 1963
- クロモンオオトリバ — Stenoptilia albilimbata Yano, 1963
- 和名未定 — Stenoptilia nolckeni (Tengström, 1870)
- 和名未定 — Stenoptilia pinarodactyla (Erschoff, 1877)
- サイグサトリバ — Stenoptilia saigusai Yano, 1963
- キキョウトリバ — Stenoptilia zophodactyla (Duponchel, 1840)
- タイワンキマダラトリバ — Xyroptila oenophanes Meyrick, 1908
- イッシキブドウトリバ — Nippoptilia issikii Yano, 1961
- コブドウトリバ — Nippoptilia minor Hori, 1933
- ブドウトリバ — Nippoptilia vitis (Sasaki, 1913)
- 和名未定 — Paraplatyptilia optata (Yano, 1963)
- ニホントリバ — Amblyptilia japonica (Yano, 1963)
- オダマキトリバ — Amblyptilia punctidactyla (Haworth, 1811)
- チョウセントリバ — Cnaemidophorus rhododactylus ([Denis & Schiffermüller], 1775)
- チャイロトリバ — Exelastis pumilio (Zeller, 1873)
- ナカノホソトリバ — Fuscoptilia emarginata (Snellen, 1884)
- ノアズキトリバ — Tomotilus saitoi Yano, 1961
- タツナミトリバ — Procapperia pelecyntes (Meyrick, 1908)
- ジョウザンチビトリバ — Capperia jozana Matsumura, 1931
- オホーツクトリバ — Oxyptilus chrysodactylus ([Denis & Schiffermüller], 1775)
- キンバネチビトリバ — Stenodacma pyrrhodes (Meyrick, 1889)
- モウセンゴケトリバ — Buckleria paludum (Zeller, 1841)
- 和名未定 — Stangeia xerodes (Meyrick, 1886)
- フジマメトリバ — Sphenarches anisodactylus (Walker, 1864)
- シロフクロトリバ — Pselnophorus japonicus Marumo, 1923
- フキトリバ — Pselnophorus vilis (Butler, 1881)
- シロカマトリバ — Hellinsia albidactylus (Yano, 1963)
- カワハラカマトリバ — Hellinsia didactylites (Ström, 1783)
- ハイモンカマトリバ — Hellinsia distinctus (Herrich-Schäffer, 1855)
- エゾトリバ — Hellinsia gypsotes (Meyrick, 1937)
- イシヤマカマトリバ — Hellinsia ishiyamanus (Matsumura, 1931)
- クワヤマカマトリバ — Hellinsia kuwayamai (Matsumura, 1931)
- キスジカマトリバ — Hellinsia lacteolus (Yano, 1963)
- ヨモギトリバ — Hellinsia lienigianus (Zeller, 1852)
- クロカマトリバ — Hellinsia nigridactylus (Yano, 1961)
- カムイカマトリバ — Hellinsia osteodactylus (Zeller, 1841)
- イノウエカマトリバ — Hellinsia tephradactylus (Hübner, [1813])
- イワテカマトリバ — Oidaematophorus iwatensis (Matsumura, 1931)
- オオカマトリバ — Oidaematophorus lithodactylus (Treitschke, 1833)
- ヒルガオトリバ — Emmelina argoteles (Meyrick, 1922)
- ウスキヒメトリバ — Adaina microdactyla (Hübner, [1813])
- シロトリバ — Pterophorus albidus (Zeller, 1852)
- マシロトリバ — Pterophorus chionadelpha (Meyrick, 1930)

== Immidae ==
- カザリニセハマキ — Moca monocosma (Diakonoff & Arita, 1979)

== Hyblaeidae ==
- ヨツボシセセリモドキ — Hyblaea constellata Guenée, 1852
- ニホンセセリモドキ — Hyblaea fortissima Butler, 1881
- キオビセセリモドキ — Hyblaea puera (Cramer, 1777)

== Carposinidae ==
- 和名未定 — Bondia quaestrix Meyrick, 1935
- シロモンクロシンクイ — Commatarcha palaeosema Meyrick, 1935
- ニセシロモンクロシンクイ — Commatarcha vaga Diakonoff, 1989
- ウスキシンクイ — Alexotypa japonica (Walsingham, 1900)
- チャモンシンクイ — Peragrarchis syncolleta (Meyrick, 1928)
- シロズシンクイ — Metacosmesis laxeuta (Meyrick, 1906)
- 和名未定 — Carposina nipponensis Walsingham, 1900
- モモシンクイガ — Carposina sasakii Matsumura, 1900
- コブシロシンクイ — Meridarchis excisa (Walsingham, 1900)
- 和名未定 — Meridarchis japonica (Walsingham, 1900)
- オオモンシロシンクイ — Meridarchis jumboa Kawabe, 1980
- 和名未定 — Meridarchis merga Diakonoff, 1989
- クロボシシロオオシンクイ — Heterogymna ochrogramma seriatopunctata Matsumura, 1931

== Copromorphidae ==
- リュウキュウマルバシンクイガ — Copromorpha kijimuna Nasu, Saito & Komai, 2004

== Thyrididae ==
- アカジママドガ — Striglina cancellata (Christoph, 1881)
- オオアカジママドガ — Striglina oceanica Inoue, 1982
- チビアカジママドガ — Striglina paravenia Inoue, 1982
- アミメマドガ — Striglina suzukii Matsumura, 1921
- ヒメアカジママドガ — Striglina venia Whalley, 1976
- ウンモンマドガ — Canaea ryukyuensis Inoue, 1965
- ヒメシロテンマドガ — Banisia myrsusalis elaralis (Walker, 1859)
- シロテンマドガ — Banisia owadai Inoue, 1976
- コシロテンマドガ — Banisia whalleyi Inoue, 1998
- マドガ — Thyris usitata Butler, 1879
- チビマダラマドガ — Rhodoneura erecta (Leech, 1889)
- ヒメマダラマドガ — Rhodoneura hyphaema (West, 1932)
- ウスマダラマドガ — Rhodoneura pallida (Butler, 1879)
- スギタニマドガ — Rhodoneura sugitanii Matsumura, 1921
- マダラマドガ — Rhodoneura vittula Guenée, 1877
- リュウキュウマダラマドガ — Pharambara splendida Butler, 1887
- タテスジマドガ — Hypolamprus ypsilon (Warren, 1899)
- クロマダラマドガ — Microbelia canidentalis (Swinhoe, 1906)
- チビマドガ — Microbelia intimalis (Moore, 1888)
- サザナミマドガ — Calindoea polygraphalis (Walker, [1866])
- ナカグロマドガ — Addaea polyphoralis (Walker, 1866)
- シロマダラマドガ — Picrostomastis marginepunctalis (Leech, 1889)
- ハスオビマドガ — Pyrinioides aurea Butler, 1881
- キイロマドガ — Pyrinioides sinuosa (Warren, 1896)
- ギンスジオオマドガ — Herdonia margarita Inoue, 1976
