= List of moths of India (Choreutidae) =

This is a list of moths of the family Choreutidae that are found in India. It also acts as an index to the species articles and forms part of the full List of moths of India.

- Anthophila cothurnata (Meyrick, 1912)
- Anthophila dichlora (Meyrick, 1912)
- Anthophila diplogramma (Meyrick, 1912)
- Anthophila eumetra (Meyrick, 1912)
- Anthophila fabriciana (Linnaeus, 1767)
- Anthophila halimora (Meyrick, 1912)
- Anthophila holachyrma (Meyrick, 1912)
- Anthophila lethaea (Meyrick, 1912)
- Anthophila oreina Diakonoff, 1979
- Anthophila sandaracina (Meyrick, 1907)
- Anthophila strepsidesma (Meyrick, 1912)
- Anthophila trogalia Meyrick (Meyrick, 1912)
- Brenthia ardens Meyrick, 1912
- Brenthia buthusalis (Walker, 1863)
- Brenthia catenata Meyrick, 1907
- Brenthia dendronympha Meyrick 1937
- Brenthia luminifera Meyrick, 1912
- Choreutis aegyptiaca (Zeller, 1867)
- Choreutis achyrodes (Meyrick, 1912)
- Choreutis euclista (Meyrick, 1918)
- Choreutis ialeura (Meyrick, 1912)
- Choreutis itriodes (Meyrick, 1912)
- Choreutis melophaga (Meyrick, 1931)
- Choreutis ophiosema (Lower, 1896)
- Choreutis orthogona (Meyrick, 1886)
- Litobrenthia carola (Meyrick, 1912)
- Litobrenthia coronigera (Meyrick, 1918)
- Peotyle atmodesma (Meyrick, 1933)
- Prochoreutis halimora (Meyrick, 1912)
- Prochoreutis hestiarcha (Meyrick, 1912)
- Prochoreutis sehestediana (Fabricius, 1776)
- Tebenna bjerkandrella (Thunberg, 1784)
- Tebenna bradleyi Clarke, 1971
