= List of moths of Australia (Choreutidae) =

Partial list of Australian moths

This is a list of the Australian species of the family Choreutidae. It also acts as an index to the species articles and forms part of the full List of moths of Australia.

== Brenthiinae ==
- Brenthia albimaculana (Snellen, 1875)
- Brenthia quadriforella Zeller, 1877

== Choreutinae ==
- Asterivora homotypa (Meyrick, 1907)
- Asterivora lampadias (Meyrick, 1907)
- Choreutis basalis (R. Felder & Rogenhofer, 1875)
- Choreutis emplecta (Turner, 1941)
- Choreutis limonias (Meyrick, 1907)
- Choreutis melanopepla (Meyrick, 1880)
- Choreutis metallica (Turner, 1898)
- Choreutis ophiosema (Lower, 1896)
- Choreutis periploca (Turner, 1913)
- Choreutis sycopola (Meyrick, 1880)
- Saptha exanthista (Meyrick, 1910)
- Saptha libanota (Meyrick, 1910)
- Tebenna micalis (Mann, 1857)
