= Choreutis lutescens =

Scientific classification
- Kingdom: Animalia
- Phylum: Arthropoda
- Clade: Pancrustacea
- Class: Insecta
- Order: Lepidoptera
- Family: Choreutidae
- Genus: Choreutis
- Species: C. lutescens

Binomial name
- Choreutis lutescens (C. Felder, R. Felder & Rogenhofer, 1875)

Synonyms
- Simaethis lutescens Felder & Rogenhofer, 1875

Species of metalmark moth

Choreutis lutescens is a moth in the family Choreutidae. It was described by Cajetan Felder, Rudolf Felder and Alois Friedrich Rogenhofer in 1875. It is found on Ambon Island.
