= Choreutis porphyratma =

Scientific classification
- Kingdom: Animalia
- Phylum: Arthropoda
- Clade: Pancrustacea
- Class: Insecta
- Order: Lepidoptera
- Family: Choreutidae
- Genus: Choreutis
- Species: C. porphyratma

Binomial name
- Choreutis porphyratma (Meyrick, 1930)

Synonyms
- Simaethis porphyratma Meyrick, 1930

Species of metalmark moth

Choreutis porphyratma is a moth in the family Choreutidae. It was described by Edward Meyrick in 1930. It is found on New Guinea.
