= Choreutis turilega =

Scientific classification
- Kingdom: Animalia
- Phylum: Arthropoda
- Clade: Pancrustacea
- Class: Insecta
- Order: Lepidoptera
- Family: Choreutidae
- Genus: Choreutis
- Species: C. turilega

Binomial name
- Choreutis turilega (Meyrick, 1924)

Synonyms
- Simaethis turilega Meyrick, 1924; Anthophila turilega

Species of metalmark moth

Choreutis turilega is a species of moth of the family Choreutidae. It is found in Mauritius (Rodrigues Island).
