= Choreutis tigroides =

Scientific classification
- Kingdom: Animalia
- Phylum: Arthropoda
- Clade: Pancrustacea
- Class: Insecta
- Order: Lepidoptera
- Family: Choreutidae
- Genus: Choreutis
- Species: C. tigroides

Binomial name
- Choreutis tigroides (Meyrick, 1921)

Synonyms
- Simaethis tigroides Meyrick, 1921; Anthophila tigroides

Species of metalmark moth

Choreutis tigroides is a moth in the family Choreutidae. It was described by Edward Meyrick in 1921 and is found on Java, Indonesia.
