= Choreutis flavimaculata =

Scientific classification
- Kingdom: Animalia
- Phylum: Arthropoda
- Clade: Pancrustacea
- Class: Insecta
- Order: Lepidoptera
- Family: Choreutidae
- Genus: Choreutis
- Species: C. flavimaculata

Binomial name
- Choreutis flavimaculata (Walsingham, 1891)

Synonyms
- Simaethis flavimaculata Walsingham, 1891; Anthophila flavimaculata

Species of metalmark moth

Choreutis flavimaculata is a species of moth of the family Choreutidae. It is found in the Republic of Congo, Central African Republic and Tanzania.

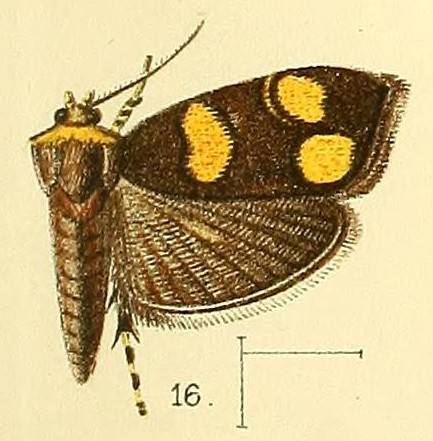
Choreutis flavimaculata
