= Choreutis montana =

Scientific classification
- Kingdom: Animalia
- Phylum: Arthropoda
- Clade: Pancrustacea
- Class: Insecta
- Order: Lepidoptera
- Family: Choreutidae
- Genus: Choreutis
- Species: C. montana

Binomial name
- Choreutis montana (Danilevsky, 1973)

Synonyms
- Hemerophila montana Danilevsky, 1973

Species of metalmark moth

Choreutis montana is a moth of the family Choreutidae. It is known from China (Qinghai), Kyrgyzstan, Tajikistan, and Kazakhstan. The wingspan is 12–14 mm. The larvae feed on Malus, Amelanchier, and Ulmus pumila. They develop on the fruits of their host plant.
