= Choreutis chelaspis =

Scientific classification
- Kingdom: Animalia
- Phylum: Arthropoda
- Clade: Pancrustacea
- Class: Insecta
- Order: Lepidoptera
- Family: Choreutidae
- Genus: Choreutis
- Species: C. chelaspis

Binomial name
- Choreutis chelaspis (Meyrick, 1928)

Synonyms
- Simaethis chelaspis Meyrick, 1928

Species of metalmark moth

Choreutis chelaspis is a moth in the family Choreutidae. It was described by Edward Meyrick in 1928. It is found on the Marquesas Islands.
