= Choreutis optica =

Scientific classification
- Kingdom: Animalia
- Phylum: Arthropoda
- Clade: Pancrustacea
- Class: Insecta
- Order: Lepidoptera
- Family: Choreutidae
- Genus: Choreutis
- Species: C. optica

Binomial name
- Choreutis optica (Meyrick, 1921)

Synonyms
- Simaethis optica Meyrick, 1921; Anthophila optica

Species of metalmark moth

Choreutis optica is a moth in the family Choreutidae. It was described by Edward Meyrick in 1921. It is found on Java in Indonesia.
