= Choreutis collapsa =

Scientific classification
- Kingdom: Animalia
- Phylum: Arthropoda
- Clade: Pancrustacea
- Class: Insecta
- Order: Lepidoptera
- Family: Choreutidae
- Genus: Choreutis
- Species: C. collapsa

Binomial name
- Choreutis collapsa (Meyrick, 1934)

Synonyms
- Anthophila collapsa Meyrick, 1934

Species of metalmark moth

Choreutis collapsa is a moth in the family Choreutidae. It was described by Edward Meyrick in 1934. It is found on Java in Indonesia.
