= Alexotypa caradjai =

Scientific classification
- Domain: Eukaryota
- Kingdom: Animalia
- Phylum: Arthropoda
- Class: Insecta
- Order: Lepidoptera
- Family: Carposinidae
- Genus: Alexotypa
- Species: A. caradjai

Binomial name
- Alexotypa caradjai Diakonoff, 1989

Species of moth

Alexotypa caradjai is a moth in the Carposinidae family. It was described by Alexey Diakonoff in 1989. It is found in China.
