= Choreutis topitis =

Scientific classification
- Kingdom: Animalia
- Phylum: Arthropoda
- Clade: Pancrustacea
- Class: Insecta
- Order: Lepidoptera
- Family: Choreutidae
- Genus: Choreutis
- Species: C. topitis

Binomial name
- Choreutis topitis (Durrant, 1915)

Synonyms
- Hemerophila topitis Durrant, 1915

Species of metalmark moth

Choreutis topitis is a moth in the family Choreutidae. It was described by John Hartley Durrant in 1915. It is found on New Guinea.
