= Choreutis irridens =

Scientific classification
- Kingdom: Animalia
- Phylum: Arthropoda
- Clade: Pancrustacea
- Class: Insecta
- Order: Lepidoptera
- Family: Choreutidae
- Genus: Choreutis
- Species: C. irridens

Binomial name
- Choreutis irridens (Meyrick, 1921)

Synonyms
- Simaethis irridens Meyrick, 1921

Species of metalmark moth

Choreutis irridens is a species of moth of the family Choreutidae. It is found in Mozambique.

The wingspan is about 10 mm (0.39 in). The forewings are dark fuscous, partially mixed with reddish-brown and slightly sprinkled with whitish, the apical two-fifths of the costa and upper two-thirds of the termen suffused with reddish-brown. There are two indistinct transverse lines of whitish irroration from white dots on the costa, the first at one-third, straight, the second sinuate-oblique from the costa at three-fifths, abruptly angulated at one-third, then thrice zigzag to the dorsum at two-thirds. The hindwings are dark grey.
