= Choreutis taprobanes =

Scientific classification
- Kingdom: Animalia
- Phylum: Arthropoda
- Clade: Pancrustacea
- Class: Insecta
- Order: Lepidoptera
- Family: Choreutidae
- Genus: Choreutis
- Species: C. taprobanes

Binomial name
- Choreutis taprobanes (Zeller, 1877)

Synonyms
- Simaethis taprobanes Zeller, 1877

Species of metalmark moth

Choreutis taprobanes is a moth in the family Choreutidae. It was described by Philipp Christoph Zeller in 1877. It is found on Sri Lanka.
