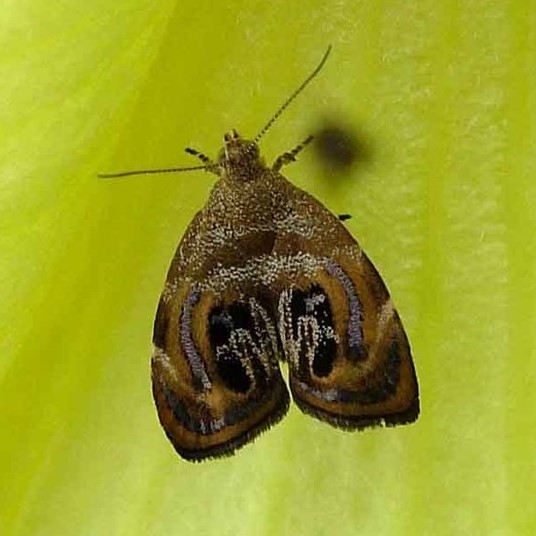

Scientific classification
- Kingdom: Animalia
- Phylum: Arthropoda
- Clade: Pancrustacea
- Class: Insecta
- Order: Lepidoptera
- Family: Choreutidae
- Genus: Choreutis
- Species: C. chalcotoxa

Binomial name
- Choreutis chalcotoxa (Meyrick, 1886)

Synonyms
- Simaethis chalcotoxa Meyrick, 1886

= Choreutis chalcotoxa =

Species of metalmark moth

Choreutis chalcotoxa is a species of moth in the family Choreutidae. It was described by Edward Meyrick in 1886. It is found in Tonga.
