= Choreutis angulosa =

Scientific classification
- Kingdom: Animalia
- Phylum: Arthropoda
- Clade: Pancrustacea
- Class: Insecta
- Order: Lepidoptera
- Family: Choreutidae
- Genus: Choreutis
- Species: C. angulosa

Binomial name
- Choreutis angulosa ([Diakonoff], 1968)

Synonyms
- Anthophila angulosa Diakonoff, 1968

Species of metalmark moth

Choreutis angulosa is a species of moth in the family Choreutidae. It was described by Alexey Diakonoff in 1968. It is found in the Philippines.
