= Choreutis inscriptana =

Scientific classification
- Kingdom: Animalia
- Phylum: Arthropoda
- Clade: Pancrustacea
- Class: Insecta
- Order: Lepidoptera
- Family: Choreutidae
- Genus: Choreutis
- Species: C. inscriptana

Binomial name
- Choreutis inscriptana (Snellen, 1875)

Synonyms
- Anthophila inscriptana Snellen, 1875

Species of metalmark moth

Choreutis inscriptana is a moth in the family Choreutidae. It was described by Snellen in 1875. It is found on Malacca and Sulawesi.
