= Choreutis parva =

Scientific classification
- Kingdom: Animalia
- Phylum: Arthropoda
- Clade: Pancrustacea
- Class: Insecta
- Order: Lepidoptera
- Family: Choreutidae
- Genus: Choreutis
- Species: C. parva

Binomial name
- Choreutis parva (Pagenstecher, 1884)

Synonyms
- Anthophila parva Pagenstecher, 1884

Species of metalmark moth

Choreutis parva is a moth in the family Choreutidae. It was described by Pagenstecher in 1884. It is found on the Moluccas.
