= Choreutis dryodora =

Scientific classification
- Kingdom: Animalia
- Phylum: Arthropoda
- Clade: Pancrustacea
- Class: Insecta
- Order: Lepidoptera
- Family: Choreutidae
- Genus: Choreutis
- Species: C. dryodora

Binomial name
- Choreutis dryodora (Meyrick, 1921)

Synonyms
- Simaethis dryodora Meyrick, 1921

Species of metalmark moth

Choreutis dryodora is a species of moth in the family Choreutidae. It is found in Mozambique.

The wingspan is about 10 mm. The forewings are ochreous-brown, or reddish-brown, slightly speckled here and there with whitish and with two indistinct lines of whitish irroration from white dots on the costa, the first at one-third, nearly straight, rather irregular, preceded by a suffused dark fuscous fascia extended by suffusion along the margins to the base, the second from the costa at three-fifths very obliquely outwards for one-third of the breadth, then rectangularly angulated and irregularly dentate to the dorsum at two-thirds, preceded by a broad irregular dark fuscous fascia extended on the costa and dorsum to the first line, and partially slenderly edged posteriorly with dark fuscous. There is some scattered dark fuscous or blackish irroration towards the apex and tornus. The hindwings are dark grey.
