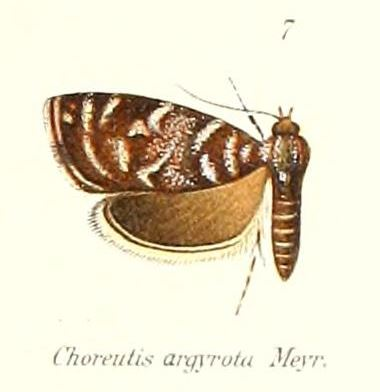

Scientific classification
- Kingdom: Animalia
- Phylum: Arthropoda
- Clade: Pancrustacea
- Class: Insecta
- Order: Lepidoptera
- Family: Choreutidae
- Genus: Choreutis
- Species: C. argyrota

Binomial name
- Choreutis argyrota Meyrick, 1912

= Choreutis argyrota =

Species of metalmark moth

Choreutis argyrota is a moth in the family Choreutidae. It was described by Edward Meyrick in 1912. It is found in Assam, India.
