= Choreutis aegyptiaca =

Scientific classification
- Kingdom: Animalia
- Phylum: Arthropoda
- Clade: Pancrustacea
- Class: Insecta
- Order: Lepidoptera
- Family: Choreutidae
- Genus: Choreutis
- Species: C. aegyptiaca

Binomial name
- Choreutis aegyptiaca (Zeller, 1867)

Synonyms
- Simaethis aegyptiaca Zeller, 1867; Eutromula hypocroca Diakonoff, 1978; Choreutis hypocroca; Choreutis latarniki

Species of metalmark moth

Choreutis aegyptiaca is a species of moth of the family Choreutidae. It is found in the India, Nepal, Israel, Saudi Arabia, the United Arab Emirates, Yemen, Egypt, La Réunion, Nepal, Oman, Uganda, Namibia and South Africa.

The larvae have been recorded feeding on Ficus sycomorus, Ficus infectoria, Ficus glomerata, Ficus reflexa and Ficus benghalensis.
