= Choreutis betuliperda =

Scientific classification
- Kingdom: Animalia
- Phylum: Arthropoda
- Clade: Pancrustacea
- Class: Insecta
- Order: Lepidoptera
- Family: Choreutidae
- Genus: Choreutis
- Species: C. betuliperda

Binomial name
- Choreutis betuliperda (Dyar, 1902)

Synonyms
- Orchemia betuliperda Dyar, 1902

Species of metalmark moth

Choreutis betuliperda is a moth in the family Choreutidae. It was described by Harrison Gray Dyar Jr. in 1902. It is found in North America, where it has been recorded from California and Colorado.
