= Choreutis streptatma =

Scientific classification
- Kingdom: Animalia
- Phylum: Arthropoda
- Clade: Pancrustacea
- Class: Insecta
- Order: Lepidoptera
- Family: Choreutidae
- Genus: Choreutis
- Species: C. streptatma

Binomial name
- Choreutis streptatma Meyrick, 1938

Synonyms
- Anthophila streptatma; Anthophila macropa Diakonoff, 1948

Species of metalmark moth

Choreutis streptatma is a moth in the family Choreutidae. It was described by Edward Meyrick in 1938. It is found on New Guinea and on Buru.
