= Choreutis gratiosa =

Scientific classification
- Kingdom: Animalia
- Phylum: Arthropoda
- Clade: Pancrustacea
- Class: Insecta
- Order: Lepidoptera
- Family: Choreutidae
- Genus: Choreutis
- Species: C. gratiosa

Binomial name
- Choreutis gratiosa (Meyrick, 1911)

Synonyms
- Simaethis gratiosa Meyrick, 1911

Species of metalmark moth

Choreutis gratiosa is a species of moth of the family Choreutidae. It is found in the Seychelles and South Africa.
