= Choreutis entechna =

Scientific classification
- Kingdom: Animalia
- Phylum: Arthropoda
- Clade: Pancrustacea
- Class: Insecta
- Order: Lepidoptera
- Family: Choreutidae
- Genus: Choreutis
- Species: C. entechna

Binomial name
- Choreutis entechna (Meyrick, 1920)

Synonyms
- Simaethis entechna Meyrick, 1920

Species of metalmark moth

Choreutis entechna is a species of moth of the family Choreutidae. It is found in South Africa.
