= Choreutis novarae =

Scientific classification
- Kingdom: Animalia
- Phylum: Arthropoda
- Clade: Pancrustacea
- Class: Insecta
- Order: Lepidoptera
- Family: Choreutidae
- Genus: Choreutis
- Species: C. novarae

Binomial name
- Choreutis novarae C. Felder, R. Felder & Rogenhofer, 1875

Synonyms
- Anthophila novarae

Species of metalmark moth

Choreutis novarae is a moth in the family Choreutidae. It was described by Cajetan Felder, Rudolf Felder and Alois Friedrich Rogenhofer in 1875. It is found on the Nicobar Islands.
