= Choreutis falsifica =

Scientific classification
- Kingdom: Animalia
- Phylum: Arthropoda
- Clade: Pancrustacea
- Class: Insecta
- Order: Lepidoptera
- Family: Choreutidae
- Genus: Choreutis
- Species: C. falsifica

Binomial name
- Choreutis falsifica (Meyrick, 1927)

Synonyms
- Simaethis falsifica Meyrick, 1927

Species of metalmark moth

Choreutis falsifica is a moth in the family Choreutidae. It was described by Edward Meyrick in 1927. It is found on Samoa.
