= Choreutis submarginalis =

Scientific classification
- Kingdom: Animalia
- Phylum: Arthropoda
- Clade: Pancrustacea
- Class: Insecta
- Order: Lepidoptera
- Family: Choreutidae
- Genus: Choreutis
- Species: C. submarginalis

Binomial name
- Choreutis submarginalis (Walker, 1865)

Synonyms
- Herbula submarginalis Walker, 1865; Anthophila submarginalis

Species of metalmark moth

Choreutis submarginalis is a moth in the family Choreutidae. It was described by Francis Walker in 1865. It is found on the Moluccas and the Maldives.
