= Choreutis plectodes =

Scientific classification
- Kingdom: Animalia
- Phylum: Arthropoda
- Clade: Pancrustacea
- Class: Insecta
- Order: Lepidoptera
- Family: Choreutidae
- Genus: Choreutis
- Species: C. plectodes

Binomial name
- Choreutis plectodes (Meyrick, 1921)

Synonyms
- Simaethis plectodes Meyrick, 1921

Species of metalmark moth

Choreutis plectodes is a species of moth of the family Choreutidae. It is found in South Africa.

The wingspan is about 11 mm. The forewings are fuscous suffusedly mixed with darker fuscous, and irregularly speckled with whitish and with an irregular straight transverse whitish line at a transverse whitish mark in the disc at two-thirds, as well as a whitish line from the costa beyond the middle, running obliquely outwards and curved around the discal mark, where it is interrupted and replaced with whitish speckling, then irregularly dentate to the dorsum beyond the middle but again interrupted with whitish speckling on the fold. A light fuscous line is found close beyond this on the upper half but similarly interrupted with whitish speckling beyond the discal mark, then irregularly dentate and somewhat mixed with whitish to the dorsum before the tornus. The hindwings are dark grey.
