= Choreutis piepersiana =

Scientific classification
- Kingdom: Animalia
- Phylum: Arthropoda
- Clade: Pancrustacea
- Class: Insecta
- Order: Lepidoptera
- Family: Choreutidae
- Genus: Choreutis
- Species: C. piepersiana

Binomial name
- Choreutis piepersiana (Snellen, 1885)

Synonyms
- Anthophila piepersiana Snellen, 1885

Species of metalmark moth

Choreutis piepersiana is a moth in the family Choreutidae. It was described by Snellen in 1885. It is found on Sulawesi.
