= Choreutis pelargodes =

Scientific classification
- Kingdom: Animalia
- Phylum: Arthropoda
- Clade: Pancrustacea
- Class: Insecta
- Order: Lepidoptera
- Family: Choreutidae
- Genus: Choreutis
- Species: C. pelargodes

Binomial name
- Choreutis pelargodes (Meyrick, 1921)

Synonyms
- Simaethis pelargodes Meyrick, 1921; Anthophila pelargodes

Species of metalmark moth

Choreutis pelargodes is a moth in the family Choreutidae. It was described by Edward Meyrick in 1921. It is found on Java in Indonesia.
