= List of moths of Japan =

Japanese biota list

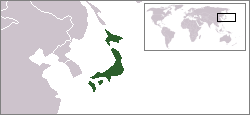
Location of Japan

Moths of Japan represent over 6,000 known moth species. The moths (mostly nocturnal) and butterflies (mostly diurnal) together make up the taxonomic order Lepidoptera.

This page provides a link to detailed lists of moth species which have been recorded in Japan, including the Japanese common names.

== Lists based on superfamilies ==
- List of moths of Japan (superfamilies Micropterigoidea to Yponomeutoidea): Micropterigoidea: Micropterigidae, Eriocraniidae, Hepialidae; Nepticuloidea: Nepticulidae, Opostegidae; Incurvarioidea: Heliozelidae, Adelidae, Prodoxidae, Incurvariidae; Tischerioidea: Tischeriidae; Tineoidea: Tineidae, Galacticidae, Psychidae, Amphitheridae; Gracillarioidea: Bucculatricidae, Gracillariidae; Yponomeutoidea: Yponomeutidae, Ypsolophidae, Plutellidae, Acrolepiidae, Glyphipterigidae, Heliodinidae, Bedelliidae, Lyonetiidae.
- List of moths of Japan (superfamily Gelechioidea): Gelechioidea: Ethmiidae, Depressariidae, Elachistidae, Parametriotidae, Deuterogoniidae, Xyloryctidae, Scythrididae, Chimabachidae, Schistonoeidae, Oecophoridae, Stathmopodidae, Lecithoceridae, Batrachedridae, Coleophoridae, Momphidae, Blastobasidae, Autostichidae, Peleopodidae, Cosmopterigidae, Gelechiidae.
- List of moths of Japan (superfamilies Zygaenoidea to Tortricoidea): Zygaenoidea: Epipyropidae, Limacodidae, Zygaenidae; Sesioidea: Brachodidae, Sesiidae; Cossoidea: Cossidae; Tortricoidea: Tortricidae.
- List of moths of Japan (superfamilies Choreutoidea to Thyridoidea): Choreutoidea: Choreutidae; Schreckensteinioidea: Schreckensteiniidae; Epermenioidea: Epermeniidae; Alucitoidea: Alucitidae; Pterophoroidea: Pterophoridae; Immoidea: Immidae; Hyblaeoidea: Hyblaeidae; Copromorphoidea: Carposinidae, Copromorphidae; Thyridoidea: Thyrididae.
- List of moths of Japan (superfamilies Pyraloidea to Drepanoidea): Pyraloidea: Pyralidae, Crambidae; Calliduloidae: Callidulidae; Drepanoidea: Epicopeiidae, Drepanidae.
- List of moths of Japan (superfamilies Bombycoidea and Geometroidea): Bombycoidea: Lasiocampidae, Eupterotidae, Bombycidae, Saturniidae, Brahmaeidae, Sphingidae; Geometroidea: Uraniidae, Geometridae.
- List of moths of Japan (superfamily Noctuoidea): Noctuoidea: Notodontidae, Lymantriidae, Arctiidae, Nolidae, Pantheidae, Noctuidae.

== See also ==
- List of butterflies of Japan
