= Commatarcha characterias =

Scientific classification
- Kingdom: Animalia
- Phylum: Arthropoda
- Class: Insecta
- Order: Lepidoptera
- Family: Carposinidae
- Genus: Commatarcha
- Species: C. characterias

Binomial name
- Commatarcha characterias (Meyrick, 1938)

Synonyms
- Bondia characterias Meyrick, 1932; Bondia autocharacta Meyrick, 1932

Species of moth

Commatarcha characterias is a moth in the family Carposinidae. It was described by Edward Meyrick in 1938. It is found in Kashmir.
