= Commatarcha citrogramma =

Scientific classification
- Kingdom: Animalia
- Phylum: Arthropoda
- Class: Insecta
- Order: Lepidoptera
- Family: Carposinidae
- Genus: Commatarcha
- Species: C. citrogramma

Binomial name
- Commatarcha citrogramma (Meyrick, 1932)

Synonyms
- Delarchis citrogramma Meyrick, 1932

Species of moth

Commatarcha citrogramma is a moth in the family Carposinidae. It was described by Edward Meyrick in 1932. It is found in Yunnan, China.
