= Choreutis ornaticornis =

Scientific classification
- Kingdom: Animalia
- Phylum: Arthropoda
- Clade: Pancrustacea
- Class: Insecta
- Order: Lepidoptera
- Family: Choreutidae
- Genus: Choreutis
- Species: C. ornaticornis

Binomial name
- Choreutis ornaticornis (Walsingham, 1900)

Synonyms
- Simaethis ornaticornis Walsingham, 1900

Species of metalmark moth

Choreutis ornaticornis is a moth in the family Choreutidae. It was described by Walsingham in 1900. It is found on Christmas Island.
