= Choreutis tricyanitis =

Scientific classification
- Kingdom: Animalia
- Phylum: Arthropoda
- Clade: Pancrustacea
- Class: Insecta
- Order: Lepidoptera
- Family: Choreutidae
- Genus: Choreutis
- Species: C. tricyanitis

Binomial name
- Choreutis tricyanitis (Meyrick, 1925)

Synonyms
- Simaethis tricyanitis Meyrick, 1925

Species of metalmark moth

Choreutis tricyanitis is a moth in the family Choreutidae. It was described by Edward Meyrick in 1925. It is found on New Guinea.
