= Choreutis antiptila =

Scientific classification
- Kingdom: Animalia
- Phylum: Arthropoda
- Clade: Pancrustacea
- Class: Insecta
- Order: Lepidoptera
- Family: Choreutidae
- Genus: Choreutis
- Species: C. antiptila

Binomial name
- Choreutis antiptila Meyrick, 1912

Species of metalmark moth

Choreutis antiptila is a moth in the family Choreutidae. It was described by Edward Meyrick in 1912. It is found in Hainan province of China, Nepal and Tien-mu-shan.
