= Commatarcha =

Scientific classification
- Kingdom: Animalia
- Phylum: Arthropoda
- Class: Insecta
- Order: Lepidoptera
- Family: Carposinidae
- Genus: Commatarcha; Meyrick, 1935

Type species
- Commatarcha palaeosema Meyrick, 1935

Synonyms
- Delarchis Meyrick, 1938

Genus of moths

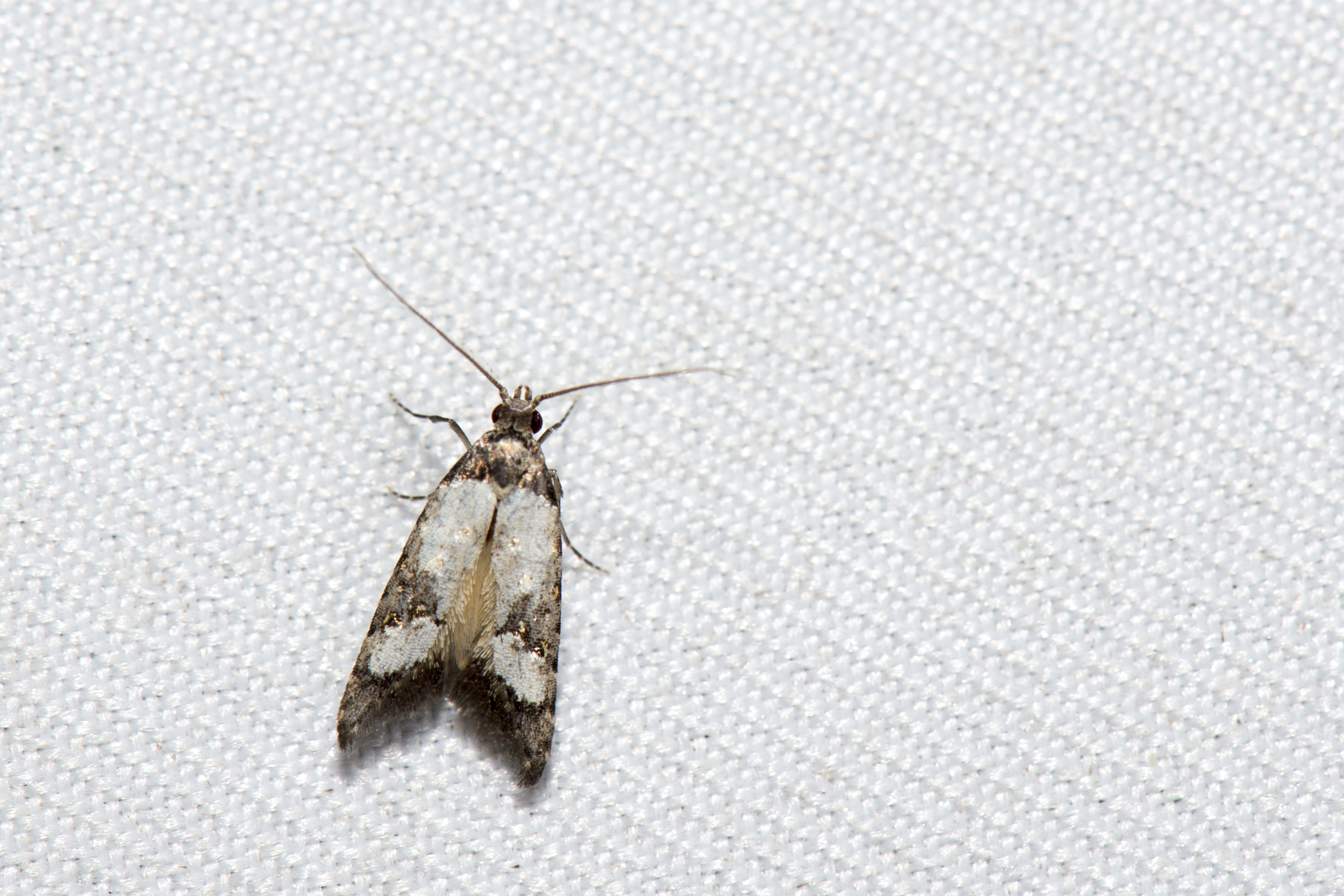
Moth

Commatarcha is a genus of moths in the family Carposinidae.

== Species ==
- Commatarcha acidodes Diakonoff, 1989
- Commatarcha characterias (Meyrick, 1932) (originally in Bondia)
- ?Commatarcha autocharacta (Meyrick, 1932) (originally in Bondia)
- Commatarcha chrysanches (Meyrick, 1938) (originally in Bondia)
- Commatarcha citrogramma (Meyrick, 1938) (originally in Delarchis)
- Commatarcha convoluta Li, 2018
- Commatarcha hamata Li, 2018
- Commatarcha oresbia Diakonoff, 1989
- Commatarcha palaeosema Meyrick, 1935
- Commatarcha quaestrix (Meyrick, 1935) (originally in Bondia)
- Commatarcha rotundivalva Li, 2018
- Commatarcha setiferaedeaga Li, 2018
- Commatarcha vaga Diakonoff, 1989
