= Choreutis anthorma =

Scientific classification
- Kingdom: Animalia
- Phylum: Arthropoda
- Clade: Pancrustacea
- Class: Insecta
- Order: Lepidoptera
- Family: Choreutidae
- Genus: Choreutis
- Species: C. anthorma

Binomial name
- Choreutis anthorma (Meyrick, 1912)

Synonyms
- Simaethis anthorma Meyrick, 1912

Species of metalmark moth

Choreutis anthorma is a moth in the family Choreutidae. It was described by Edward Meyrick in 1912. It is found in the Philippines.
