= Choreutis psilachyra =

Scientific classification
- Kingdom: Animalia
- Phylum: Arthropoda
- Clade: Pancrustacea
- Class: Insecta
- Order: Lepidoptera
- Family: Choreutidae
- Genus: Choreutis
- Species: C. psilachyra

Binomial name
- Choreutis psilachyra (Meyrick, 1912)

Synonyms
- Simaethis psilachyra Meyrick, 1912

Species of metalmark moth

Choreutis psilachyra is a moth in the family Choreutidae. It was described by Edward Meyrick in 1912. It is found in Sri Lanka.
