= Commatarcha oresbia =

Scientific classification
- Kingdom: Animalia
- Phylum: Arthropoda
- Class: Insecta
- Order: Lepidoptera
- Family: Carposinidae
- Genus: Commatarcha
- Species: C. oresbia

Binomial name
- Commatarcha oresbia Diakonoff, 1989

Species of moth

Commatarcha oresbia is a moth in the family Carposinidae. It was described by Alexey Diakonoff in 1989. It is found in Pakistan.
