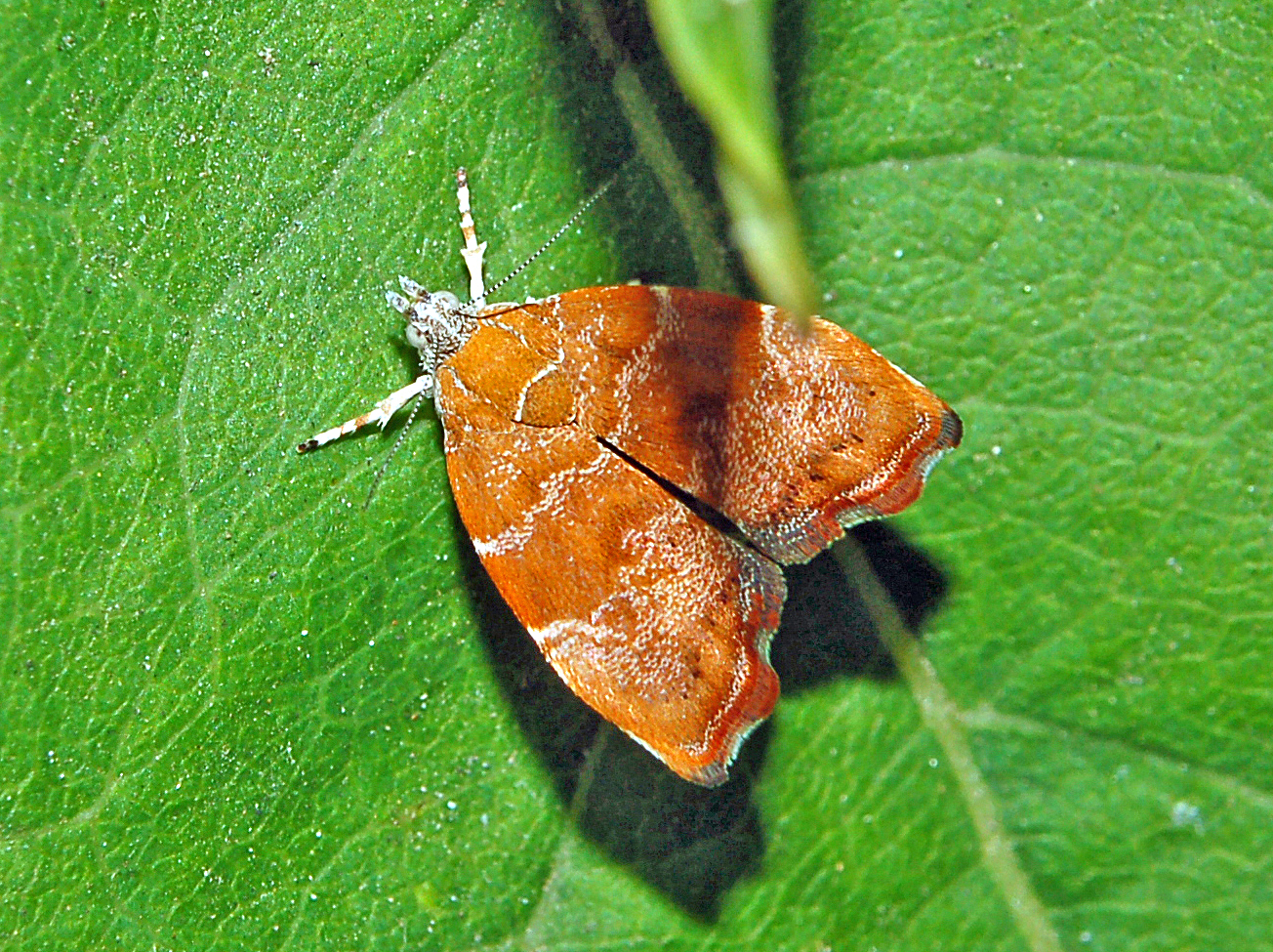
- Dorsal view
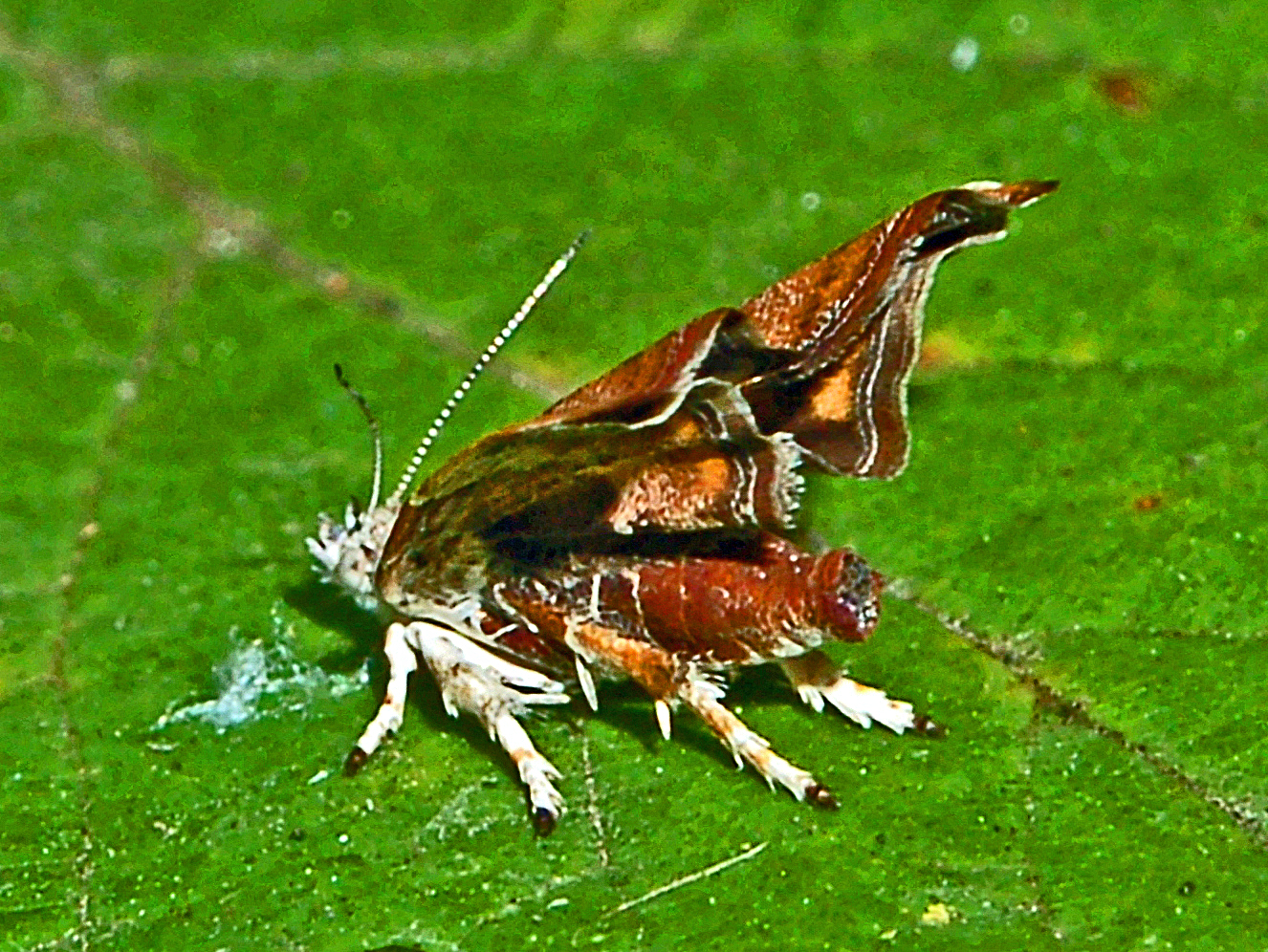
- Ventral view

Scientific classification
- Kingdom: Animalia
- Phylum: Arthropoda
- Clade: Pancrustacea
- Class: Insecta
- Order: Lepidoptera
- Family: Choreutidae
- Genus: Choreutis
- Species: C. nemorana

Binomial name
- Choreutis nemorana (Hübner, [1799])

Synonyms
- List: Tortrix nemorana Hübner, [1799]; Asopia incisalis Treitschke, 1829; Simaethis nemorana; Choreutis incisalis; Xylopoda nemorana; Hemerophila nemorana; Allononyma nemorana; Anthophila nemorana

= Choreutis nemorana =

Species of moth

Choreutis nemorana, the fig-tree skeletonizer moth or fig leaf roller, is a species of moth of the family Choreutidae. It was first described by the German entomologist Jacob Hübner in 1799. They are found in Asia, Europe and North Africa.

== Description ==
Choreutis nemorana has a wingspan of 16–20 mm. The basic color of the forewings varies from reddish brown to ocher brown, with whitish markings. The hindwings are brownish, with two pale brown dots on the edge. Adults overwinter and appear in early spring. Adults of the summer generation emerge in July. The second generation emerges in autumn and hibernate.

The larvae feed within a spiining on the upperside of fig leaves (Ficus carica) and pupate in a tough white cocoon in a leaf-edge fold.

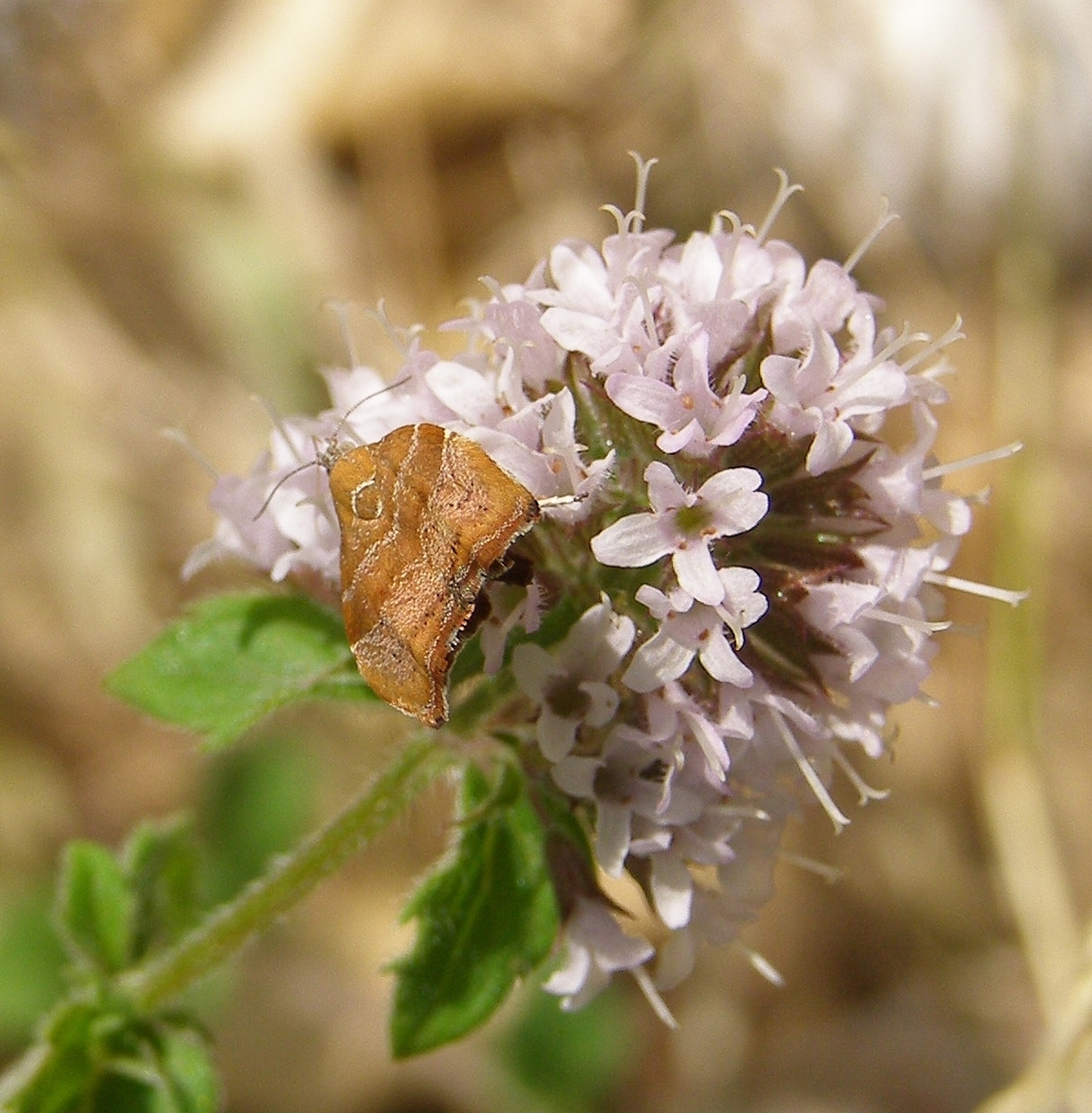
Choreutis nemorana

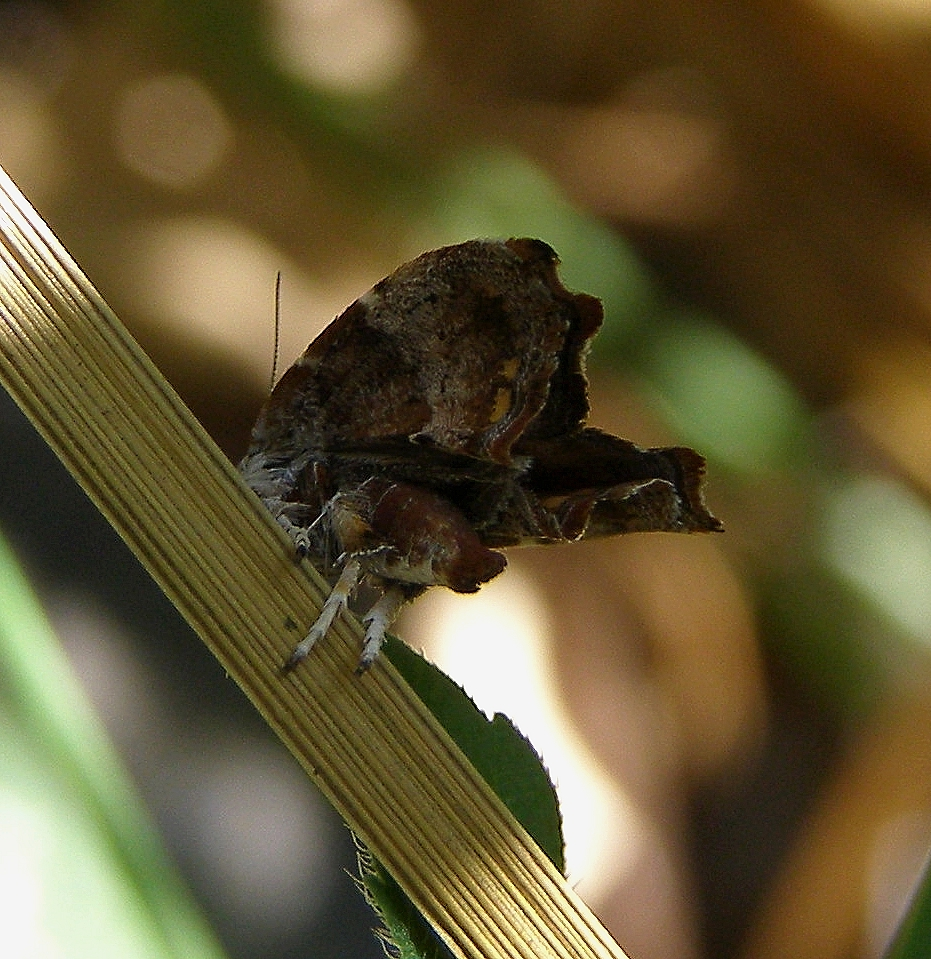
The underside of the hind wings

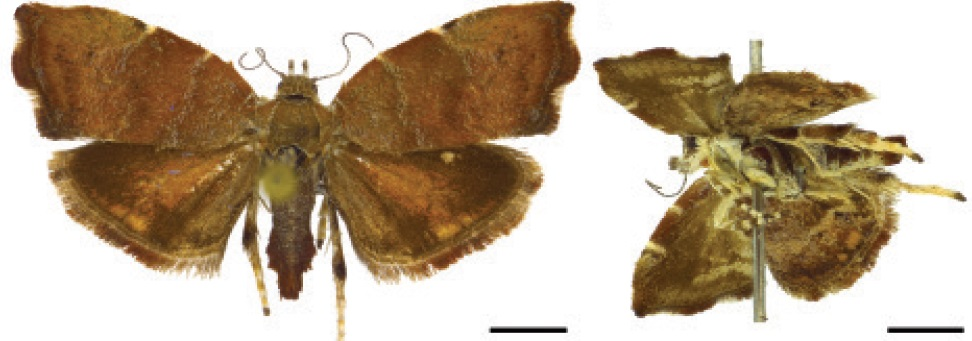
Mounted adult

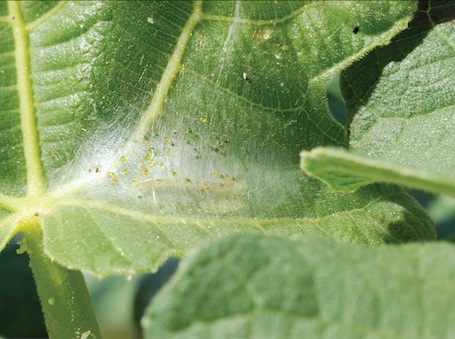
Larva under webbing

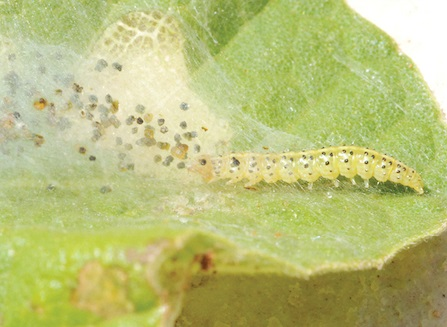
Larva exiting web shelter

== Distribution ==
This species is widespread from the Canary Islands and Madeira, through the Mediterranean Region and North Africa to Asia.

In 2009, it was first recorded in Belgium, established colonies in the east and is expected to spread to the west. It was first seen in the United Kingdom in 2014 and has since spread to East Anglia, the Isle of Wight and Kent.

== Treatment ==
The eggs can be removed by hand or can be controlled using pyrethrin-based pesticides.

== Taxonomy ==
The genus Choreutis was raised by the German entomologist Jacob Hübner in 1825 and the name refers to dancers; the chorus in a Greek drama being singers as well as dancers. The moths fly by day and when they land on a flower they make quick, jerky movements.

== See also ==
- Choreutis pariana, the apple-and-thorn skeletonizer or apple leaf skeletonizer
