= Choreutis equatoris =

Scientific classification
- Kingdom: Animalia
- Phylum: Arthropoda
- Clade: Pancrustacea
- Class: Insecta
- Order: Lepidoptera
- Family: Choreutidae
- Genus: Choreutis
- Species: C. equatoris

Binomial name
- Choreutis equatoris (Walsingham, 1897)

Synonyms
- Simaethis equatoris Walsingham, 1897; Anthophila equatoris

Species of metalmark moth

Choreutis equatoris is a species of moth of the family Choreutidae. It is found in the Republic of the Congo.
