= Commatarcha chrysanches =

Scientific classification
- Kingdom: Animalia
- Phylum: Arthropoda
- Class: Insecta
- Order: Lepidoptera
- Family: Carposinidae
- Genus: Commatarcha
- Species: C. chrysanches

Binomial name
- Commatarcha chrysanches (Meyrick, 1935)

Synonyms
- Bondia chrysanches Meyrick, 1935

Species of moth

Commatarcha chrysanches is a moth in the family Carposinidae. It was described by Edward Meyrick in 1935. It is found in Yunnan, China.
