= Peotyle batangensis =

Scientific classification
- Domain: Eukaryota
- Kingdom: Animalia
- Phylum: Arthropoda
- Class: Insecta
- Order: Lepidoptera
- Family: Choreutidae
- Genus: Peotyle
- Species: P. batangensis

Binomial name
- Peotyle batangensis (Caradja, 1940)

Synonyms
- Choreutis batangensis Caradja, 1940

Species of moth

Peotyle batangensis is a moth in the family Choreutidae. It was described by Aristide Caradja in 1940. It is found in Tibet.
