= Choreutis tomicodes =

Scientific classification
- Kingdom: Animalia
- Phylum: Arthropoda
- Clade: Pancrustacea
- Class: Insecta
- Order: Lepidoptera
- Family: Choreutidae
- Genus: Choreutis
- Species: C. tomicodes

Binomial name
- Choreutis tomicodes (Meyrick, 1930)

Synonyms
- Simaethis tomicodes Meyrick, 1930; Anthophila tomicodes

Species of metalmark moth

Choreutis tomicodes is a moth in the family Choreutidae. It was described by Edward Meyrick in 1930. It is found on the Solomon Islands.
