= Choreutis cyanotoxa =

Scientific classification
- Kingdom: Animalia
- Phylum: Arthropoda
- Clade: Pancrustacea
- Class: Insecta
- Order: Lepidoptera
- Family: Choreutidae
- Genus: Choreutis
- Species: C. cyanotoxa

Binomial name
- Choreutis cyanotoxa (Meyrick, 1907)

Synonyms
- Simaethis cyanotoxa Meyrick, 1907

Species of metalmark moth

Choreutis cyanotoxa is a moth in the family Choreutidae. It was described by Edward Meyrick in 1907. It is found on the Solomon Islands.
