= Choreutis quincyella =

Scientific classification
- Kingdom: Animalia
- Phylum: Arthropoda
- Clade: Pancrustacea
- Class: Insecta
- Order: Lepidoptera
- Family: Choreutidae
- Genus: Choreutis
- Species: C. quincyella

Binomial name
- Choreutis quincyella (Legrand, 1965)

Synonyms
- Anthophila quincyella Legrand, 1965

Species of metalmark moth

Choreutis quincyella is a moth in the family Choreutidae. It was described by Henry Legrand in 1965. It is found on Menai Island.
