= Choreutis bathysema =

Scientific classification
- Kingdom: Animalia
- Phylum: Arthropoda
- Clade: Pancrustacea
- Class: Insecta
- Order: Lepidoptera
- Family: Choreutidae
- Genus: Choreutis
- Species: C. bathysema

Binomial name
- Choreutis bathysema (Diakonoff, 1978)

Synonyms
- Eutromula bathysema Diakonoff, 1978

Species of metalmark moth

Choreutis bathysema is a moth in the family Choreutidae. It was described by Alexey Diakonoff in 1978. It is found in Yunnan, China.
