= Choreutis marzoccai =

Scientific classification
- Kingdom: Animalia
- Phylum: Arthropoda
- Clade: Pancrustacea
- Class: Insecta
- Order: Lepidoptera
- Family: Choreutidae
- Genus: Choreutis
- Species: C. marzoccai

Binomial name
- Choreutis marzoccai Pastrana, 1991

Synonyms
- Choreutis merzoccai

Species of metalmark moth

Choreutis marzoccai is a moth in the family Choreutidae. It was described by Pastrana in 1991. It is found in Argentina.
