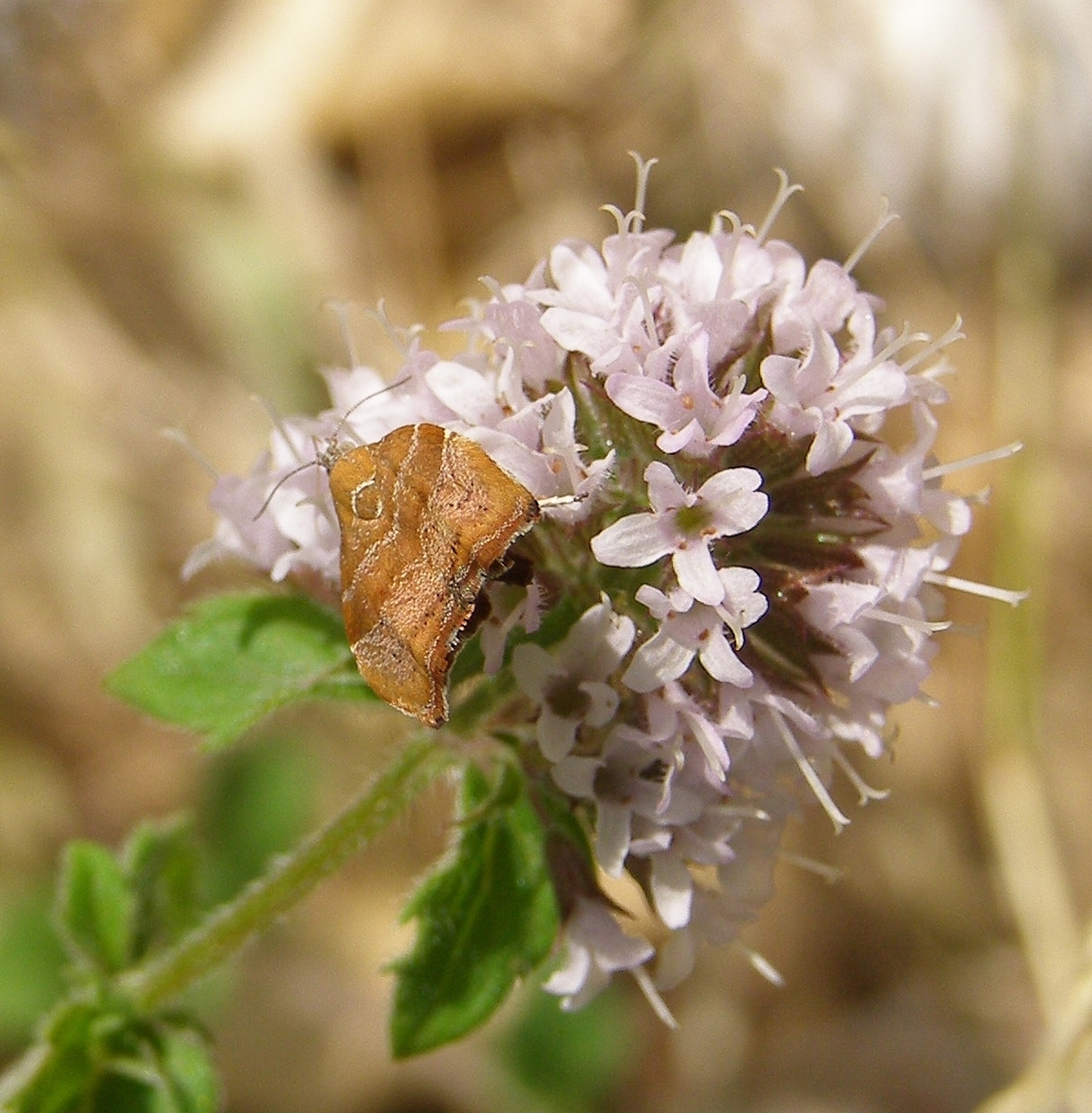
- Fig-tree skeletonizer (C. nemorata) imago visiting some flowers

Scientific classification
- Kingdom: Animalia
- Phylum: Arthropoda
- Clade: Pancrustacea
- Class: Insecta
- Order: Lepidoptera
- Family: Choreutidae
- Subfamily: Choreutinae
- Genus: Choreutis; Hübner, [1825]

Type species
- Phalaena pariana Clerck, 1759

Synonyms
- Hemerophila Hübner, 1806 (suppressed by ICZN Opinion 97); Eutromula Frölich, 1828; Macropia Costa, 1836; Entomoloma Ragonot, 1875; Hemerophila Fernald, 1900 Preocc. (nec Hübner, 1817); Orchemia Fernald, 1900 Preocc. (nec Guenée, 1945); Choreutidia Sauber, 1902; Allononyma Busck, 1904

= Choreutis =

Genus of metalmark moths

Choreutis is a genus of moths in the family of metalmark moths (Choreutidae), and therein to subfamily Choreutinae. Of these, it is the type genus. The genus was described by Jacob Hübner in 1825.

== Species ==
- Choreutis achyrodes (Meyrick, 1912)
- Choreutis aegyptiaca (Zeller, 1867)
- Choreutis agelasta Bradley, 1965
- Choreutis amethystodes (Meyrick, 1914)
- Choreutis angulosa [Diakonoff], 1968
- Choreutis anthorma (Meyrick, 1912)
- Choreutis antichlora (Meyrick, 1912)
- Choreutis antiptila Meyrick, 1912
- Choreutis argoxantha (Meyrick, 1934)
- Choreutis argyrota Meyrick 1912
- Choreutis argyrastra Meyrick, 1932
- Choreutis atrosignata (Christoph, 1888)
- Choreutis basalis (R. Felder & Rogenhofer, 1875)
- Choreutis bathysema (Diakonoff, 1978)
- Choreutis betuliperda (Dyar, 1902)
- Choreutis caradjai Diakonoff, 1984
- Choreutis chalcotoxa (Meyrick, 1886)
- Choreutis chelaspis (Meyrick, 1928)
- Choreutis chi (Durrant, 1915)
- Choreutis collapsa (Meyrick, 1934)
- Choreutis cothurnata (Meyrick, 1912)
- Choreutis cunuligera Diakonoff, 1978
- Choreutis cyanogramma (Diakonoff & Arita, 1979)
- Choreutis cyanotoxa (Meyrick, 1907)
- Choreutis diana – Diana's choreutis moth
- Choreutis dichlora (Meyrick, 1912)
- Choreutis diplogramma (Meyrick, 1921)
- Choreutis dryodora (Meyrick, 1921)
- Choreutis entechna (Meyrick, 1920)
- Choreutis equatoris
- Choreutis euclista (Meyrick, 1918)
- Choreutis eumetra (Meyrick, 1912)
- Choreutis falsifica (Meyrick, 1927)
- Choreutis flavimaculata
- Choreutis gratiosa (Meyrick, 1911)
- Choreutis holachyrma (Meyrick, 1912)
- Choreutis hyligenes (Butler, 1879)
- Choreutis ialeura (Meyrick, 1912)
- Choreutis inscriptana (Snellen, 1875)
- Choreutis inspirata Meyrick, 1916
- Choreutis irimochla (Meyrick, 1921)
- Choreutis irridens (Meyrick, 1921)
- Choreutis itriodes (Meyrick, 1912)
- Choreutis japonica (Zeller, 1877)
- Choreutis lethaea (Meyrick, 1912)
- Choreutis limonias
- Choreutis ludifica (Meyrick, 1914)
- Choreutis lutescens (C. Felder, R. Felder & Rogenhofer, 1875)
- Choreutis marzoccai Pastrana, 1991
- Choreutis melanopepla
- Choreutis melophaga (Meyrick, 1931)
- Choreutis mesolyma (Diakonoff, 1978)
- Choreutis metallica
- Choreutis minuta (Diakonoff & Arita, 1979)
- Choreutis montana
- Choreutis nemorana – fig-tree skeletonizer, fig leaf roller
- Choreutis niphocrypta (Meyrick, 1930)
- Choreutis novarae C. Felder, R. Felder & Rogenhofer, 1875
- Choreutis obarata (Meyrick, 1921)
- Choreutis ophiosema (Lower, 1896)
- Choreutis optica (Meyrick, 1921)
- Choreutis ornaticornis (Walsingham, 1900)
- Choreutis orthogona (Meyrick, 1886)
- Choreutis pariana – apple-and-thorn skeletonizer, apple leaf skeletonizer
- Choreutis parva (Pagenstecher, 1884)
- Choreutis pelargodes (Meyrick, 1921)
- Choreutis pentacyba Meyrick, 1926
- Choreutis periploca
- Choreutis piepersiana (Snellen, 1885)
- Choreutis plectodes (Meyrick, 1921)
- Choreutis plumbealis (Pagenstecher, 1884)
- Choreutis porphyratma (Meyrick, 1930)
- Choreutis psilachyra (Meyrick, 1912)
- Choreutis pychnomochla Bradley, 1965
- Choreutis quincyella (Legrand, 1965)
- Choreutis sandaracina (Meyrick, 1907)
- Choreutis semicincta (Meyrick, 1921)
- Choreutis sexfasciella (Sauber, 1902)
- Choreutis simplex Diakonoff, 1955
- Choreutis stereocrossa (Meyrick, 1921)
- Choreutis strepsidesma (Meyrick, 1912)
- Choreutis streptatma Meyrick, 1938
- Choreutis submarginalis (Walker)
- Choreutis sycopola
- Choreutis taprobanes (Zeller, 1877)
- Choreutis tigroides (Meyrick, 1921)
- Choreutis tomicodes (Meyrick, 1930)
- Choreutis topitis (Durrant, 1915)
- Choreutis torridula (Meyrick, 1926)
- Choreutis tricyanitis (Meyrick, 1925)
- Choreutis trogalia (Meyrick, 1912)
- Choreutis turilega
- Choreutis vinosa (Diakonoff, 1978)
- Choreutis xanthogramma (Meyrick, 1912)
- Choreutis yakushimensis (Marumo, 1923)
