= Alexotypa =

Scientific classification
- Domain: Eukaryota
- Kingdom: Animalia
- Phylum: Arthropoda
- Class: Insecta
- Order: Lepidoptera
- Family: Carposinidae
- Genus: Alexotypa; Diakonoff, 1989

Genus of moths

Alexotypa is a genus of moths in the Carposinidae family.

== Species ==
- Alexotypa caradjai Diakonoff, 1989
- Alexotypa japonica (Walsingham, 1900) (originally in Propedesis)
- Alexotypa vitiata (Meyrick, 1913) (originally in Meridarchis)
