= Choreutis simplex =

Scientific classification
- Kingdom: Animalia
- Phylum: Arthropoda
- Clade: Pancrustacea
- Class: Insecta
- Order: Lepidoptera
- Family: Choreutidae
- Genus: Choreutis
- Species: C. simplex

Binomial name
- Choreutis simplex Diakonoff, 1955

Species of metalmark moth

Choreutis simplex is a moth in the family Choreutidae. It was described by Alexey Diakonoff in 1955. It is found in New Guinea.
