= Choreutis chi =

Scientific classification
- Kingdom: Animalia
- Phylum: Arthropoda
- Clade: Pancrustacea
- Class: Insecta
- Order: Lepidoptera
- Family: Choreutidae
- Genus: Choreutis
- Species: C. chi

Binomial name
- Choreutis chi (Durrant, 1915)

Synonyms
- Hemerophila chi Durrant, 1915

Species of metalmark moth

Choreutis chi is a moth in the family Choreutidae. It was described by John Hartley Durrant in 1915. It is found in Papua New Guinea.
