= Alexotypa vitiata =

Scientific classification
- Domain: Eukaryota
- Kingdom: Animalia
- Phylum: Arthropoda
- Class: Insecta
- Order: Lepidoptera
- Family: Carposinidae
- Genus: Alexotypa
- Species: A. vitiata

Binomial name
- Alexotypa vitiata (Meyrick, 1913)

Synonyms
- Meridarchis vitiata Meyrick, 1913

Species of moth

Alexotypa vitiata is a moth in the family Carposinidae. It was described by Edward Meyrick in 1913. It is found in Assam, India.
