= Choreutis torridula =

Scientific classification
- Kingdom: Animalia
- Phylum: Arthropoda
- Clade: Pancrustacea
- Class: Insecta
- Order: Lepidoptera
- Family: Choreutidae
- Genus: Choreutis
- Species: C. torridula

Binomial name
- Choreutis torridula (Meyrick, 1926)

Synonyms
- Simaethis torridula Meyrick, 1926; Anthophila torridula

Species of metalmark moth

Choreutis torridula is a moth in the family Choreutidae. It was described by Edward Meyrick in 1926. It is found in Sierra Leone.
