= Peotyle =

Scientific classification
- Domain: Eukaryota
- Kingdom: Animalia
- Phylum: Arthropoda
- Class: Insecta
- Order: Lepidoptera
- Family: Choreutidae
- Genus: Peotyle; Diakonoff, 1978

Genus of moths

Peotyle is a genus of moths in the family Choreutidae.

== Species ==
- Peotyle atmodesma (Meyrick, 1933)
- Peotyle batangensis (Caradja, 1940)
