= Choreutis stereocrossa =

Scientific classification
- Kingdom: Animalia
- Phylum: Arthropoda
- Clade: Pancrustacea
- Class: Insecta
- Order: Lepidoptera
- Family: Choreutidae
- Genus: Choreutis
- Species: C. stereocrossa

Binomial name
- Choreutis stereocrossa (Meyrick, 1921)

Synonyms
- Simaethis stereocrossa Meyrick, 1921

Species of metalmark moth

Choreutis stereocrossa is a species of moth of the family Choreutidae. It is found in Mozambique.

The wingspan is about 11 mm. The forewings are ferruginous, irregularly whitish-speckled, this irroration partially tinged with grey towards the base of the scales. There are two faint transverse lines of whitish irroration rising from small white dots on the costa, the first at two-fifths, rather irregular, the second from three-fifths of the costa very obliquely outwards for one-third of the breadth, then nearly rectangularly bent and rather irregular to three-fourths of the dorsum. The hindwings are grey.
