= Choreutis caradjai =

Scientific classification
- Kingdom: Animalia
- Phylum: Arthropoda
- Clade: Pancrustacea
- Class: Insecta
- Order: Lepidoptera
- Family: Choreutidae
- Genus: Choreutis
- Species: C. caradjai

Binomial name
- Choreutis caradjai Diakonoff, 1984

Species of metalmark moth

Choreutis caradjai is a moth in the family Choreutidae. It was described by Alexey Diakonoff in 1984. It is found in Yunnan, China.
