= Choreutis mesolyma =

Scientific classification
- Kingdom: Animalia
- Phylum: Arthropoda
- Clade: Pancrustacea
- Class: Insecta
- Order: Lepidoptera
- Family: Choreutidae
- Genus: Choreutis
- Species: C. mesolyma

Binomial name
- Choreutis mesolyma (Diakonoff, 1978)

Synonyms
- Eutromula mesolyma Diakonoff, 1978

Species of metalmark moth

Choreutis mesolyma is a moth in the family Choreutidae. It was described by Alexey Diakonoff in 1978. It is found in Szechuen, China.
