= Choreutis pentacyba =

Scientific classification
- Kingdom: Animalia
- Phylum: Arthropoda
- Clade: Pancrustacea
- Class: Insecta
- Order: Lepidoptera
- Family: Choreutidae
- Genus: Choreutis
- Species: C. pentacyba

Binomial name
- Choreutis pentacyba Meyrick, 1926

Species of metalmark moth

Choreutis pentacyba is a species of moth of the family Choreutidae. It is found in Egypt.
