= Choreutis melanopepla =

Scientific classification
- Kingdom: Animalia
- Phylum: Arthropoda
- Clade: Pancrustacea
- Class: Insecta
- Order: Lepidoptera
- Family: Choreutidae
- Genus: Choreutis
- Species: C. melanopepla

Binomial name
- Choreutis melanopepla (Meyrick, 1880)

Synonyms
- Simaethis melanopepla Meyrick, 1880; Simaethis lygaeopa Turner, 1923

Species of metalmark moth

Choreutis melanopepla is a species of moth of the family Choreutidae. It is found in Australia.
