= Commatarcha quaestrix =

Scientific classification
- Kingdom: Animalia
- Phylum: Arthropoda
- Class: Insecta
- Order: Lepidoptera
- Family: Carposinidae
- Genus: Commatarcha
- Species: C. quaestrix

Binomial name
- Commatarcha quaestrix (Meyrick, 1938)

Synonyms
- Bondia quaestrix Meyrick, 1938

Species of moth

Commatarcha quaestrix is a moth in the family Carposinidae. It was described by Edward Meyrick in 1938. It is found in southern China and Japan.
