= Choreutis japonica =

Scientific classification
- Kingdom: Animalia
- Phylum: Arthropoda
- Clade: Pancrustacea
- Class: Insecta
- Order: Lepidoptera
- Family: Choreutidae
- Genus: Choreutis
- Species: C. japonica

Binomial name
- Choreutis japonica (Zeller, 1877)

Synonyms
- Simaethis japonica Zeller, 1877; Anthophila japonica

Species of metalmark moth

Choreutis japonica is a moth in the family Choreutidae. It was described by Zeller in 1877. It is found in Japan.

The larvae feed on Ficus erecta.
