= Choreutis yakushimensis =

Scientific classification
- Kingdom: Animalia
- Phylum: Arthropoda
- Clade: Pancrustacea
- Class: Insecta
- Order: Lepidoptera
- Family: Choreutidae
- Genus: Choreutis
- Species: C. yakushimensis

Binomial name
- Choreutis yakushimensis (Marumo, 1923)

Synonyms
- Simaethis yakushimensis Marumo, 1923; Anthophila yakushimensis

Species of metalmark moth

Choreutis yakushimensis is a moth in the family Choreutidae. It was described by Nobukatsu Marumo in 1923. It is found in Japan and Taiwan.
