= Choreutis diplogramma =

Scientific classification
- Kingdom: Animalia
- Phylum: Arthropoda
- Clade: Pancrustacea
- Class: Insecta
- Order: Lepidoptera
- Family: Choreutidae
- Genus: Choreutis
- Species: C. diplogramma

Binomial name
- Choreutis diplogramma (Meyrick, 1921)

Synonyms
- Simaethis diplogramma Meyrick, 1921; Anthophila diplogramma

Species of metalmark moth

Choreutis diplogramma is a moth in the family Choreutidae. It was described by Edward Meyrick in 1921. It is found in Assam, India.
