= Alexotypa japonica =

Scientific classification
- Kingdom: Animalia
- Phylum: Arthropoda
- Class: Insecta
- Order: Lepidoptera
- Family: Carposinidae
- Genus: Alexotypa
- Species: A. japonica

Binomial name
- Alexotypa japonica (Walsingham, 1900)

Synonyms
- Propedesis japonica Walsingham, 1900

Species of moth

Alexotypa japonica is a moth in the family Carposinidae. It was described by Walsingham in 1900. It is found in Japan and China.
