= Ficus infectoria =

Ficus infectoria is a taxon synonym for three species of flowering plants:

- Ficus infectoria Miq., a synonym of Ficus virens var. virens
- Ficus infectoria Willd., a synonym of Ficus tsjakela Burm.f
- Ficus infectoria Roxb., a synonym of Ficus lacor Buch.-Ham.
