= Choreutis sycopola =

Scientific classification
- Kingdom: Animalia
- Phylum: Arthropoda
- Clade: Pancrustacea
- Class: Insecta
- Order: Lepidoptera
- Family: Choreutidae
- Genus: Choreutis
- Species: C. sycopola

Binomial name
- Choreutis sycopola (Meyrick, 1880)

Synonyms
- Simaethis sycopola Meyrick, 1880; Simaethis pyrrhoclista Meyrick, 1922

Species of metalmark moth

Choreutis sycopola is a species of moth of the family Choreutidae. It is found from southern Queensland to central New South Wales.

Larvae feed on the foliage of Ficus species.
