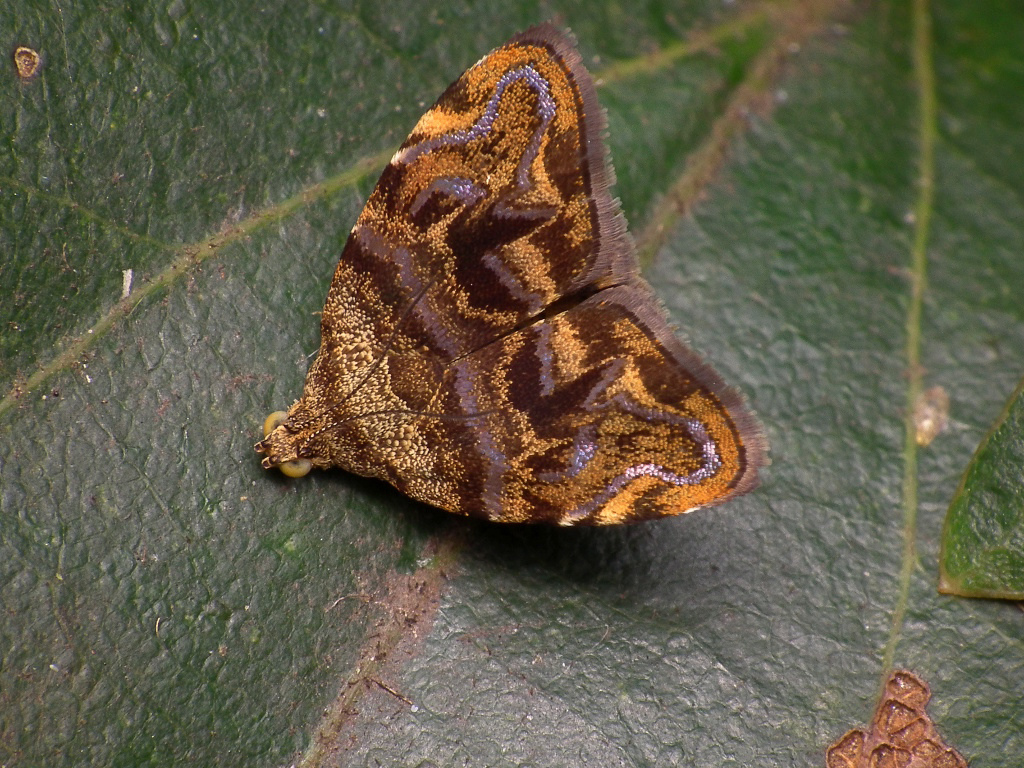

Scientific classification
- Kingdom: Animalia
- Phylum: Arthropoda
- Clade: Pancrustacea
- Class: Insecta
- Order: Lepidoptera
- Family: Choreutidae
- Genus: Choreutis
- Species: C. metallica

Binomial name
- Choreutis metallica (Turner, 1898)

Synonyms
- Simaethis metallica Turner, 1898

= Choreutis metallica =

Species of metalmark moth

Choreutis metallica is a species of moth of the family Choreutidae. It is found in Queensland.
