= Choreutis orthogona =

Scientific classification
- Kingdom: Animalia
- Phylum: Arthropoda
- Clade: Pancrustacea
- Class: Insecta
- Order: Lepidoptera
- Family: Choreutidae
- Genus: Choreutis
- Species: C. orthogona

Binomial name
- Choreutis orthogona (Meyrick, 1886)

Synonyms
- Anthophila orthogona Meyrick, 1886; Simaethis orthogona Meyrick, 1886; Simaethis periploca Turner, 1913

Species of metalmark moth

Choreutis orthogona is a moth in the family Choreutidae. It was described by Edward Meyrick in 1886. It is found in India, Sri Lanka, Myanmar, Celebes and New Guinea.

The larval host plant is Psoralea corylifolia.
