= Peotyle atmodesma =

Scientific classification
- Kingdom: Animalia
- Phylum: Arthropoda
- Class: Insecta
- Order: Lepidoptera
- Family: Choreutidae
- Genus: Peotyle
- Species: P. atmodesma

Binomial name
- Peotyle atmodesma (Meyrick, 1933)

Synonyms
- Choreutis atmodesma Meyrick, 1933

Species of moth

Peotyle atmodesma is a moth in the family Choreutidae. It was described by Edward Meyrick in 1933. It is found in Kashmir.
