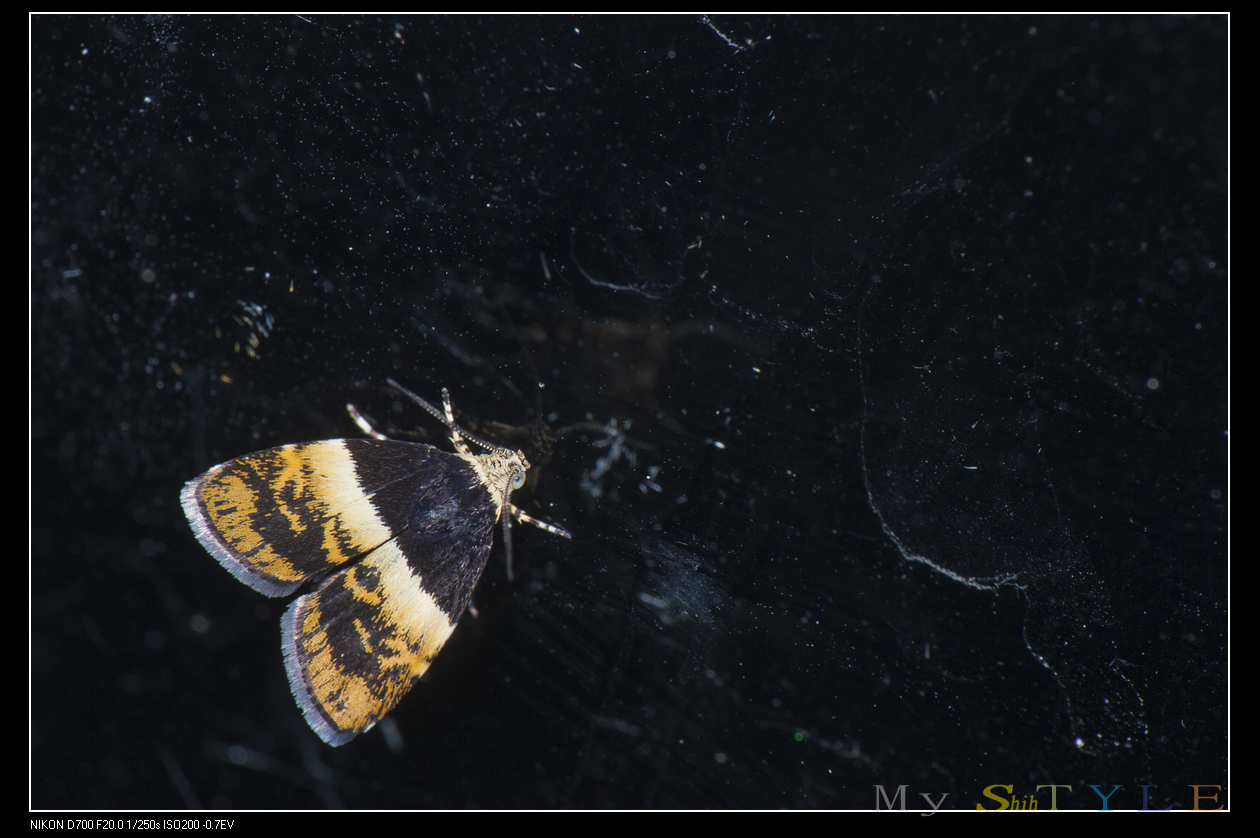

Scientific classification
- Kingdom: Animalia
- Phylum: Arthropoda
- Clade: Pancrustacea
- Class: Insecta
- Order: Lepidoptera
- Family: Choreutidae
- Genus: Choreutis
- Species: C. xanthogramma

Binomial name
- Choreutis xanthogramma (Meyrick, 1912)

Synonyms
- Simaethis xanthogramma Meyrick, 1912; Anthophila xanthogramma

= Choreutis xanthogramma =

Species of metalmark moth

Choreutis xanthogramma is a moth in the family Choreutidae. It was described by Edward Meyrick in 1912. It is found in Taiwan, the Philippines, New Guinea and on the Kei Islands and Ryukyu Islands.
