= Choreutis ialeura =

Scientific classification
- Kingdom: Animalia
- Phylum: Arthropoda
- Clade: Pancrustacea
- Class: Insecta
- Order: Lepidoptera
- Family: Choreutidae
- Genus: Choreutis
- Species: C. ialeura

Binomial name
- Choreutis ialeura (Meyrick, 1912)

Synonyms
- Simaethis ialeura Meyrick, 1912; Anthophila ialeura

Species of metalmark moth

Choreutis ialeura is a species of moth of the family Choreutidae described by Edward Meyrick in 1912. It is found in China, India, Sri Lanka, Nepal and Mauritius.

The larvae have been recorded feeding on Malus pumila.
