= Commatarcha palaeosema =

Scientific classification
- Kingdom: Animalia
- Phylum: Arthropoda
- Class: Insecta
- Order: Lepidoptera
- Family: Carposinidae
- Genus: Commatarcha
- Species: C. palaeosema

Binomial name
- Commatarcha palaeosema Meyrick, 1932

Species of moth

Commatarcha palaeosema is a moth in the family Carposinidae. It was described by Edward Meyrick in 1932. It is found in Japan.

The moth's larva feed under the bark of castanopsis cuspidata.
