= Choreutis dichlora =

Scientific classification
- Kingdom: Animalia
- Phylum: Arthropoda
- Clade: Pancrustacea
- Class: Insecta
- Order: Lepidoptera
- Family: Choreutidae
- Genus: Choreutis
- Species: C. dichlora

Binomial name
- Choreutis dichlora (Meyrick, 1912)

Synonyms
- Simaethis dichlora Meyrick, 1912; Anthophila dichlora

Species of metalmark moth

Choreutis dichlora is a moth in the family Choreutidae. It was described by Edward Meyrick in 1912. It is found in India and China.
