= Choreutis atrosignata =

Scientific classification
- Kingdom: Animalia
- Phylum: Arthropoda
- Clade: Pancrustacea
- Class: Insecta
- Order: Lepidoptera
- Family: Choreutidae
- Genus: Choreutis
- Species: C. atrosignata

Binomial name
- Choreutis atrosignata (Christoph, 1888)

Synonyms
- Simaethis atrosignata Christoph, 1888; Simaethis moiwana Matsumura, 1931; Hemerophila ussuriensis Danilevsky, 1973

Species of metalmark moth

Choreutis atrosignata is a moth in the family Choreutidae. It was described by Hugo Theodor Christoph in 1888. It is found in the Russian Far East (Ussuri), Japan and China.

The larvae feed on Malus species and Ulmus davidiana.

== Subspecies ==
- Choreutis atrosignata atrosignata
- Choreutis atrosignata sinica Diakonoff, 1984 (China)
