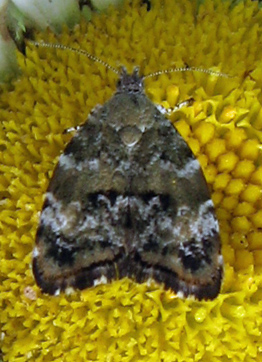

Scientific classification
- Kingdom: Animalia
- Phylum: Arthropoda
- Class: Insecta
- Order: Lepidoptera
- Family: Choreutidae
- Genus: Choreutis
- Species: C. diana

Binomial name
- Choreutis diana (Hübner, 1822)

Synonyms
- List: Tortix diana Hübner, [1822]; Coccyx decorana Zetterstedt, [1839]; Amphisa luridana Walker, 1864; Simaethis vicarialis Zeller, 1875; Choreutis dianalis; Hemerophila diana; Anthophila diana; Eutromula diana

= Choreutis diana =

Species of moth

Choreutis diana, Diana's choreutis moth, is a moth of the family Choreutidae. It is found in northern North America and most of Europe. It was first described by the German entomologist, Jacob Hübner in 1819.

== Description ==
The wingspan is 14–18 mm.

In Canada, adults have been recorded from mid-April to mid-May, in June and from July to September. In the UK, adults are on wing in July and August. Adults have been found visiting thistle flowers.

The larvae feed on red alder (Alnus rubra), grey alder (Alnus incana), paper birch (Betula papyrifera), balsam poplar (Populus balsamifera), willow (Salix species) and cherry (Prunus species). It is a solitary leafroller, found under a silken web on the upper surface of a leaf of the host plant. The frass is caught in the web. Larvae have been recorded from mid-June to late July in North America.

== Distribution ==
Found in northern North America and most of Europe, in Britain it is only known from only one site; Glen Affric, in the Highland region of Scotland.
