= Hellinsia ishiyamanus =

Scientific classification
- Domain: Eukaryota
- Kingdom: Animalia
- Phylum: Arthropoda
- Class: Insecta
- Order: Lepidoptera
- Family: Pterophoridae
- Genus: Hellinsia
- Species: H. ishiyamanus

Binomial name
- Hellinsia ishiyamanus (Matsumura, 1931)

Synonyms
- Pterophorus ishiyamanus Matsumura, 1931; Oidaematophorus ishiyamanus

Species of plume moth

Hellinsia ishiyamanus is a moth of the family Pterophoridae that is known from Japan (Hokkaido, Honshu), Korea and China.

The wingspan is about 19 millimetres (0.75 in) and the length of the forewings is 10–11 millimetres (0.39–0.43 in).

The larvae feed on Artemisia vulgaris.
