= Choreutis vinosa =

Scientific classification
- Kingdom: Animalia
- Phylum: Arthropoda
- Clade: Pancrustacea
- Class: Insecta
- Order: Lepidoptera
- Family: Choreutidae
- Genus: Choreutis
- Species: C. vinosa

Binomial name
- Choreutis vinosa (Diakonoff, 1978)

Synonyms
- Eutromula vinosa Diakonoff, 1978; Euromula vinosa discolor Diakonoff & Arita, 1979

Species of metalmark moth

Choreutis vinosa is a moth in the family Choreutidae. It was described by Alexey Diakonoff in 1978. It is found in Japan and the Russian Far East (Irkutsk, Amur, Ussuri).

== Subspecies ==
- Choreutis vinosa vinosa (Russia)
- Choreutis vinosa discolor (Diakonoff & Arita, 1979) (Japan)
