= Choreutis melophaga =

Scientific classification
- Kingdom: Animalia
- Phylum: Arthropoda
- Clade: Pancrustacea
- Class: Insecta
- Order: Lepidoptera
- Family: Choreutidae
- Genus: Choreutis
- Species: C. melophaga

Binomial name
- Choreutis melophaga (Meyrick, 1931)

Synonyms
- Simaethis melophaga Meyrick, 1931; Anthophila melophaga

Species of metalmark moth

Choreutis melophaga is a moth in the family Choreutidae. It was described by Edward Meyrick in 1931. It is found in India.
