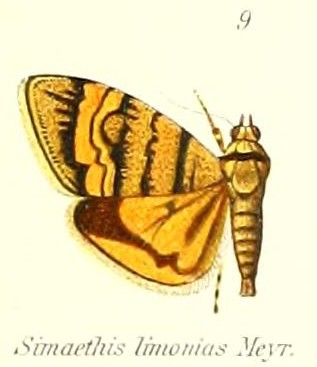

Scientific classification
- Kingdom: Animalia
- Phylum: Arthropoda
- Clade: Pancrustacea
- Class: Insecta
- Order: Lepidoptera
- Family: Choreutidae
- Genus: Choreutis
- Species: C. limonias

Binomial name
- Choreutis limonias (Meyrick, 1907)

Synonyms
- Simaethis limonias Meyrick, 1907

= Choreutis limonias =

Species of metalmark moth

Choreutis limonias is a species of moth of the family Choreutidae. It is found in Australia.
