= Choreutis euclista =

Scientific classification
- Kingdom: Animalia
- Phylum: Arthropoda
- Clade: Pancrustacea
- Class: Insecta
- Order: Lepidoptera
- Family: Choreutidae
- Genus: Choreutis
- Species: C. euclista

Binomial name
- Choreutis euclista (Meyrick, 1918)

Synonyms
- Simaethis euclista Meyrick, 1918; Anthophila euclista Meyrick, 1918

Species of metalmark moth

Choreutis euclista is a moth in the family Choreutidae. It was described by Edward Meyrick in 1918. It is found in India, Sri Lanka and Myanmar.
