= Choreutis cunuligera =

Scientific classification
- Kingdom: Animalia
- Phylum: Arthropoda
- Clade: Pancrustacea
- Class: Insecta
- Order: Lepidoptera
- Family: Choreutidae
- Genus: Choreutis
- Species: C. cunuligera

Binomial name
- Choreutis cunuligera (Diakonoff, 1978)

Synonyms
- Eutromula cunuligera Diakonoff, 1978

Species of metalmark moth

Choreutis cunuligera is a moth of the family Choreutidae. It is known from China (Guizhou, Zhejiang) and Japan (Honshu).

The wingspan is about 12 mm for males and 11 mm for females.

== Etymology ==
The name is derived from cunula (meaning a small cradle) and gero (meaning to bear).
