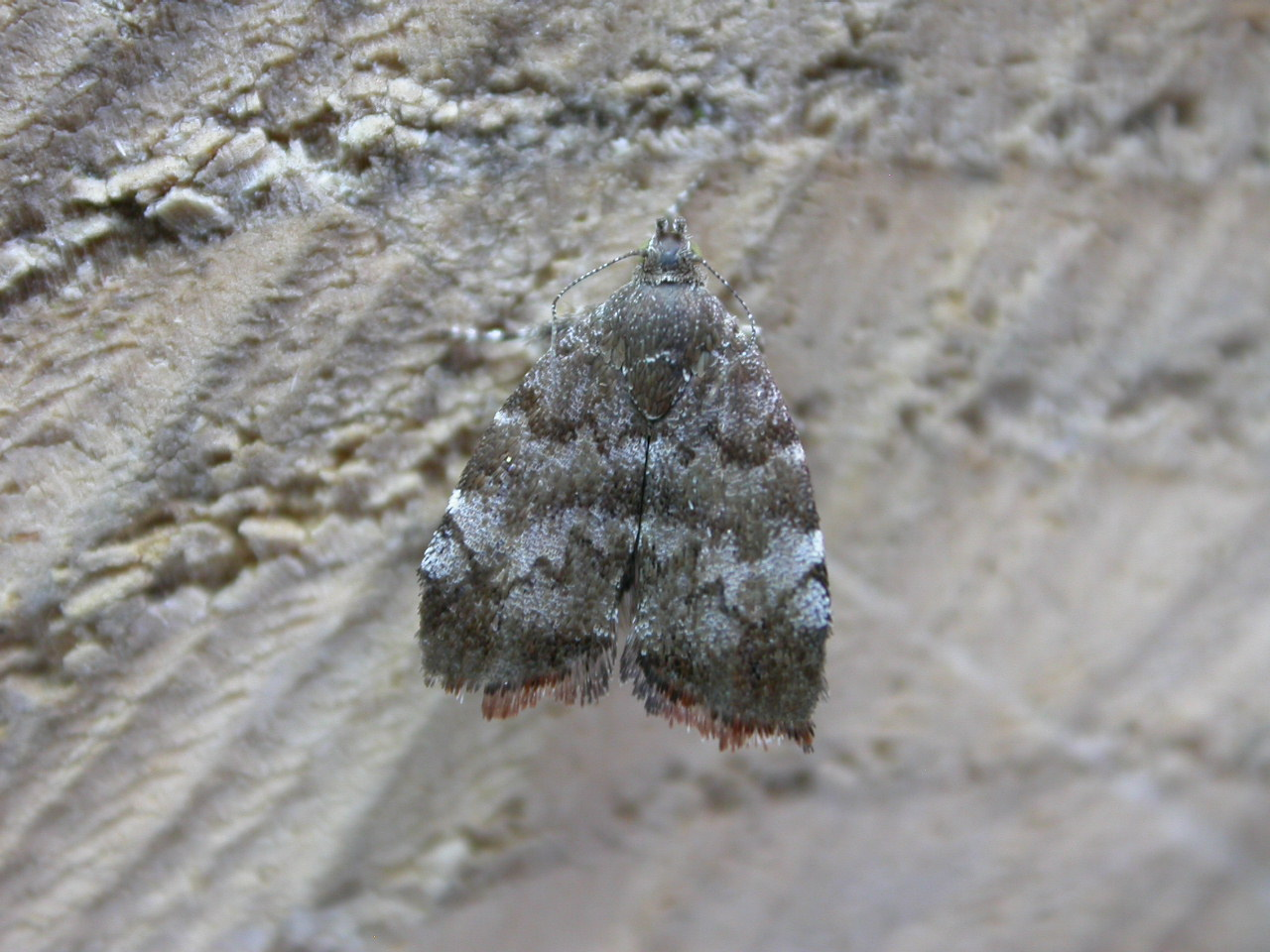

Scientific classification
- Kingdom: Animalia
- Phylum: Arthropoda
- Class: Insecta
- Order: Lepidoptera
- Family: Choreutidae
- Genus: Choreutis
- Species: C. pariana

Binomial name
- Choreutis pariana (Clerck, 1759)

Synonyms
- Phalaena pariana Clerck, 1759; Anthophila lutosa Haworth, 1811; Asopia parialis Treitschke, 1829; Pyralis pariana; Hemerophila pariana; Tortrix pariana; Simaethis paralis; Xylopoda parialis; Eretromula pariana; Simaethis pariana

= Choreutis pariana =

Species of moth

Choreutis pariana, the apple-and-thorn skeletonizer or apple leaf skeletonizer, is a moth of the family Choreutidae. The species was first described by the Swedish entomologist Carl Alexander Clerck in 1759. It is native to Eurasia and was introduced to New England, USA in 1917. It has also recently been stated in Korea. Over the past 150 years, the use of various alternatives for the generic name of C. pariana and other species of Choreutis has led to taxonomic confusion. Older literature can be found using generic names like Eutromula, Hemerophila, Orchemia, or Simaethis, all of which have later either been clarified as completely separate genera or work as synonyms for one or more species.

== Physical characteristics ==
The appearance of the apple-and-thorn skeletonizer larva follows a rather typical pattern for choreutid larvae, having clearly defined, dark brown pinacula for primary setae (that is, setae appearing in the first and often second instars of the larva) and elongated, narrow prolegs, with crochets arranged in a uniordinal circle.

The wingspan of the adult moth is about 11–15 mm. The maculation of adult individuals from closely related Choreutis species can be confusingly similar, often leading to the need for genital examination in order to differentiate between species. The apple leaf skeletonizer is usually more brownish in maculation, but the banding needs to be carefully confirmed.

== Life cycle ==
The larvae typically feed under a fine silken web on the upperside of a leaf, eating the parenchyma, with the exception of the lower cuticle, which is left on the leaf as a brown blotch, resulting in a skeleton leaf-like appearance. Larvae have been found on crab apples, hawthorns, paper birches, Betula dahurica, willows, cherries, whitebeams, ashes, roses and alders. Apple-and-thorn skeletonizer larvae have been recorded from June to early September in North America, while in Britain they are found during May and June, and again in August. The larvae pupate in a whitish, 15–20 mm long silk cocoon, which is usually attached to the underside of a leaf.

In Canada, adults have been recorded from late July to late October. In Western Europe, the moth flies in two generations, with adults on wing in July and again in September when they overwinter, and may appear again in early spring.

== Distribution ==
The apple leaf skeletonizer is found in Asia and Europe from Japan to Ireland, and was introduced to New England in 1917. It is frequently collected in agricultural areas in North America where it is found along the West Coast of the United States and in British Columbia, Ontario, New Brunswick, Nova Scotia, Prince Edward Island and Newfoundland and Labrador.

== See also ==
- Choreutis nemorana, the fig-tree skeletonizer moth or fig leaf roller
