= Prochoreutis halimora =

Scientific classification
- Domain: Eukaryota
- Kingdom: Animalia
- Phylum: Arthropoda
- Class: Insecta
- Order: Lepidoptera
- Family: Choreutidae
- Genus: Prochoreutis
- Species: P. halimora

Binomial name
- Prochoreutis halimora (Meyrick, 1912)

Synonyms
- Simaethis halimora Meyrick, 1912; Anthophila halimora

Species of moth

Prochoreutis halimora is a moth in the family Choreutidae. It was described by Edward Meyrick in 1912. It is found in India (Assam) and Taiwan.
