= Choreutis cyanogramma =

Scientific classification
- Kingdom: Animalia
- Phylum: Arthropoda
- Clade: Pancrustacea
- Class: Insecta
- Order: Lepidoptera
- Family: Choreutidae
- Genus: Choreutis
- Species: C. cyanogramma

Binomial name
- Choreutis cyanogramma (Diakonof & Arita, 1979)

Synonyms
- Eutromula cyanogramma Diakonoff & Arita, 1979

Species of metalmark moth

Choreutis cyanogramma is a moth in the family Choreutidae. It was described by Alexey Diakonoff and Yutaka Arita in 1979. It is found on the Ryukyu Islands.
