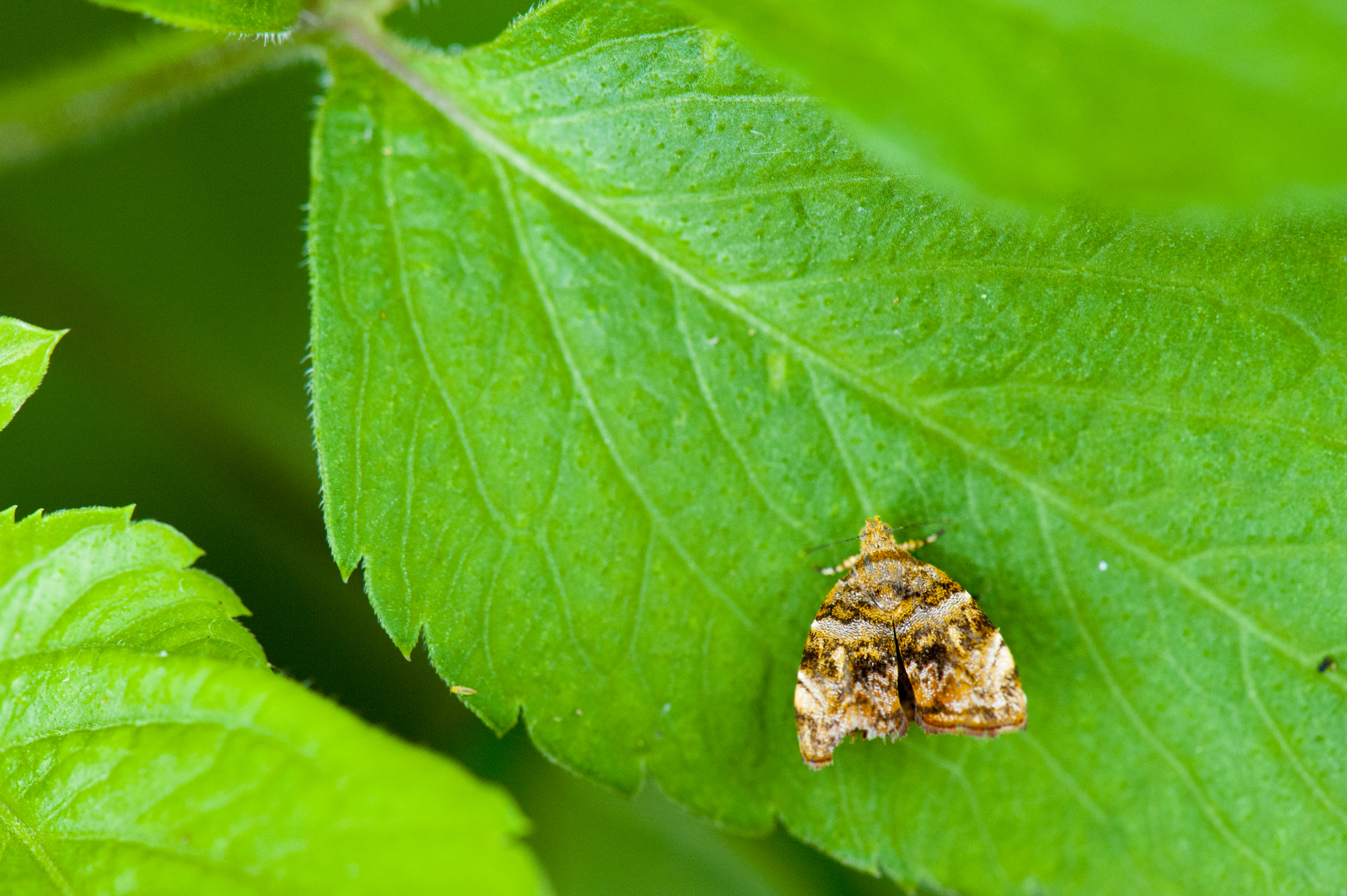

Scientific classification
- Kingdom: Animalia
- Phylum: Arthropoda
- Clade: Pancrustacea
- Class: Insecta
- Order: Lepidoptera
- Family: Choreutidae
- Genus: Choreutis
- Species: C. hyligenes

Binomial name
- Choreutis hyligenes (Butler, 1879)

Synonyms
- Simaethis hyligenes Butler, 1879

= Choreutis hyligenes =

Species of metalmark moth

Choreutis hyligenes is a moth in the family Choreutidae. It was described by Arthur Gardiner Butler in 1879. It is found in China, Taiwan, and Japan.

The larvae feed on Broussonetia kazinoki and Broussonetia kaempferi.
