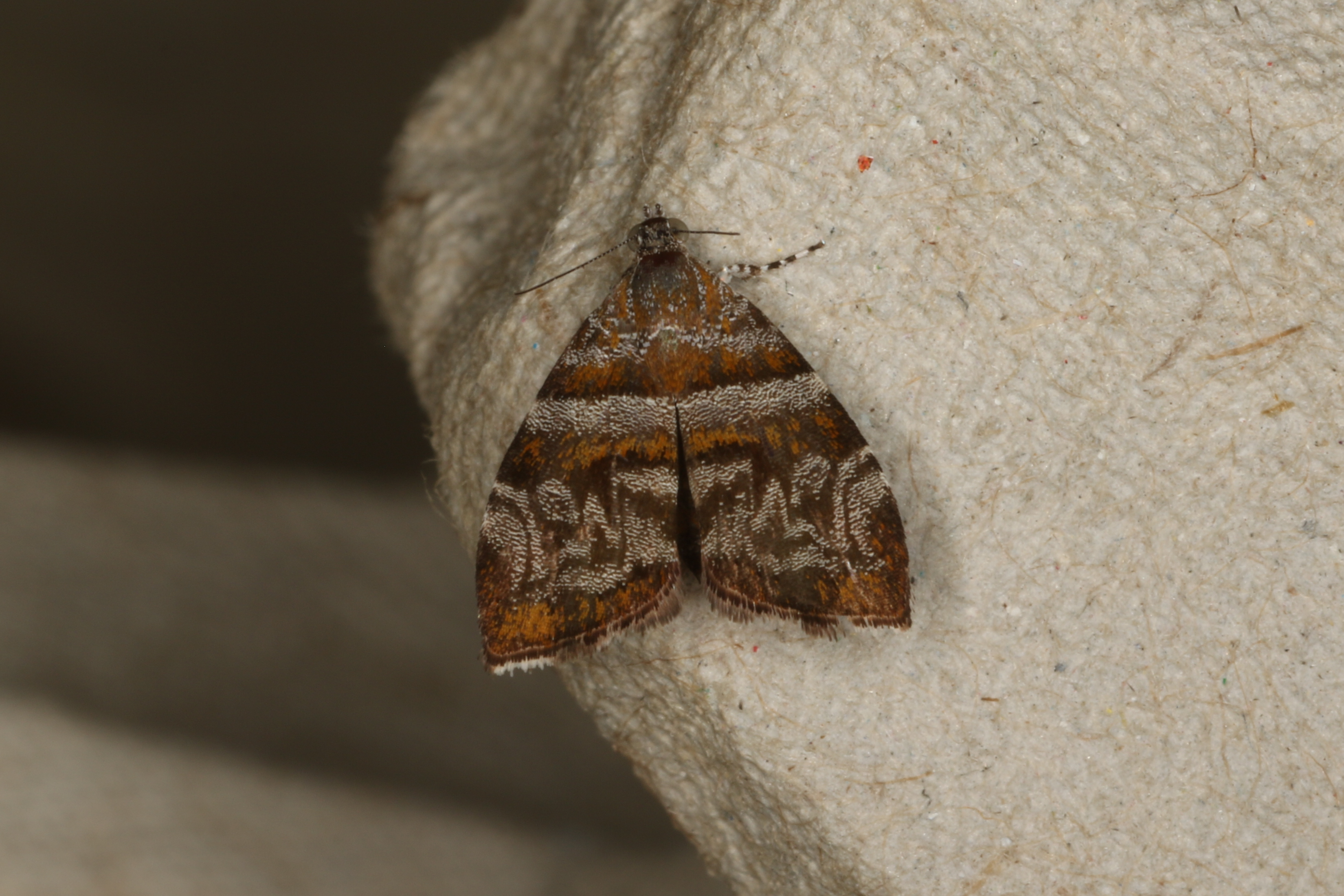
- Mission Beach, Queensland, 13/14 January 2016

Scientific classification
- Kingdom: Animalia
- Phylum: Arthropoda
- Clade: Pancrustacea
- Class: Insecta
- Order: Lepidoptera
- Family: Choreutidae
- Genus: Choreutis
- Species: C. periploca

Binomial name
- Choreutis periploca (Turner, 1913)

Synonyms
- Simaethis periploca Turner, 1913

= Choreutis periploca =

Species of metalmark moth

Choreutis periploca is a species of moth of the family Choreutidae. It is found in Queensland.
