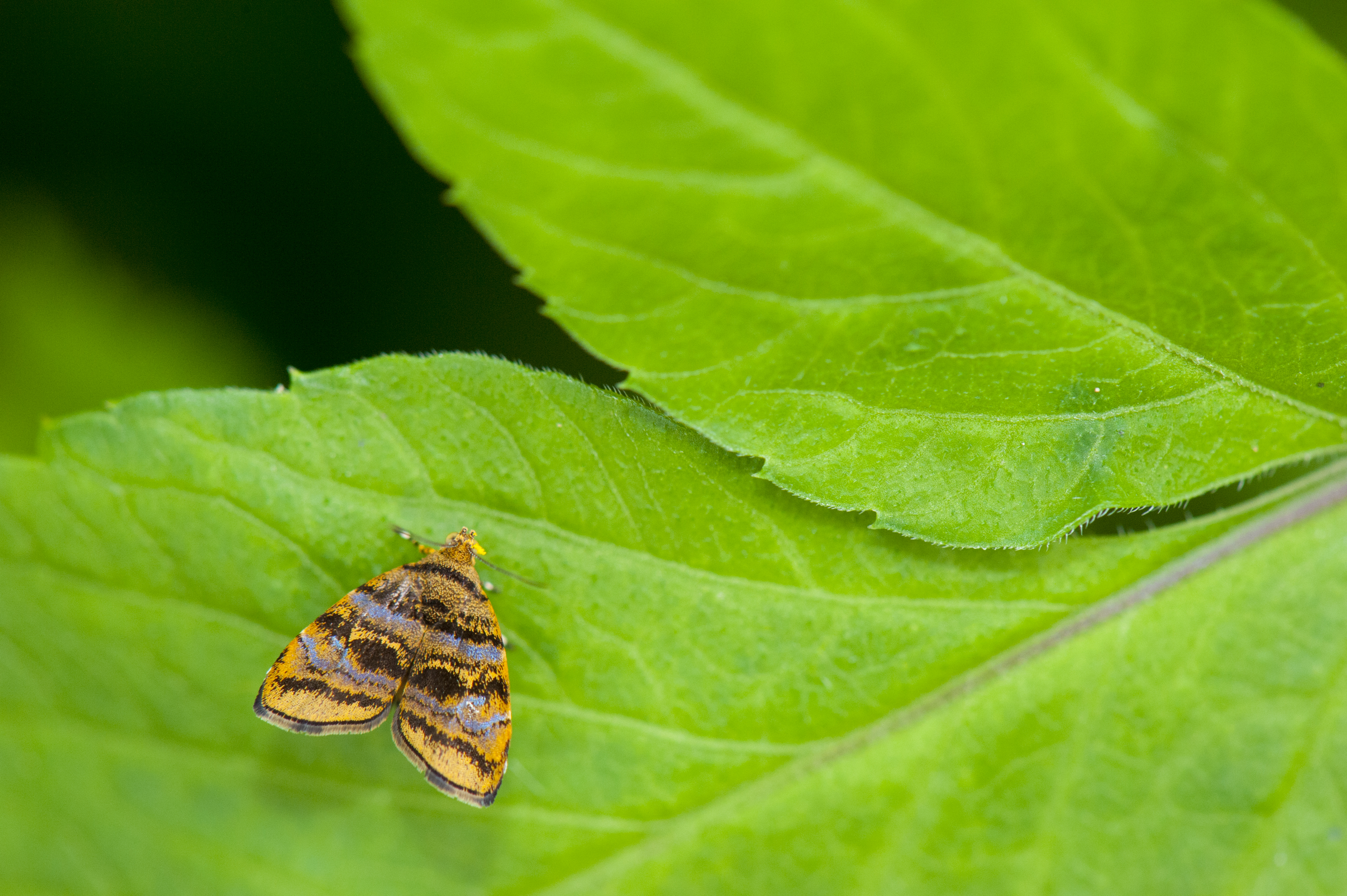

Scientific classification
- Kingdom: Animalia
- Phylum: Arthropoda
- Clade: Pancrustacea
- Class: Insecta
- Order: Lepidoptera
- Family: Choreutidae
- Genus: Choreutis
- Species: C. amethystodes

Binomial name
- Choreutis amethystodes (Meyrick, 1914)

Synonyms
- Simaethis amethystodes Meyrick, 1914; Anthophila amethystodes

= Choreutis amethystodes =

Species of metalmark moth

Choreutis amethystodes is a moth in the family Choreutidae. It was described by Edward Meyrick in 1914. It is found in the Philippines, Taiwan and on the Ryukyu Islands and Java.
