= Choreutis achyrodes =

Scientific classification
- Kingdom: Animalia
- Phylum: Arthropoda
- Clade: Pancrustacea
- Class: Insecta
- Order: Lepidoptera
- Family: Choreutidae
- Genus: Choreutis
- Species: C. achyrodes

Binomial name
- Choreutis achyrodes (Meyrick, 1912)

Synonyms
- Simaethis achyrodes Meyrick, 1912; Simaethis albifascialis Marumo, 1923; Simaethis kochiensis Matsumura, 1931

Species of metalmark moth

Choreutis achyrodes is a moth of the family Choreutidae. It is known from China (Guangxi, Guizhou, Taiwan), Japan (Shikoku, Kyushu, Ryukyu Islands), India (Assam) and the Oriental region.

The wingspan is 10–15 mm.

The larvae feed on Ficus wightiana.
