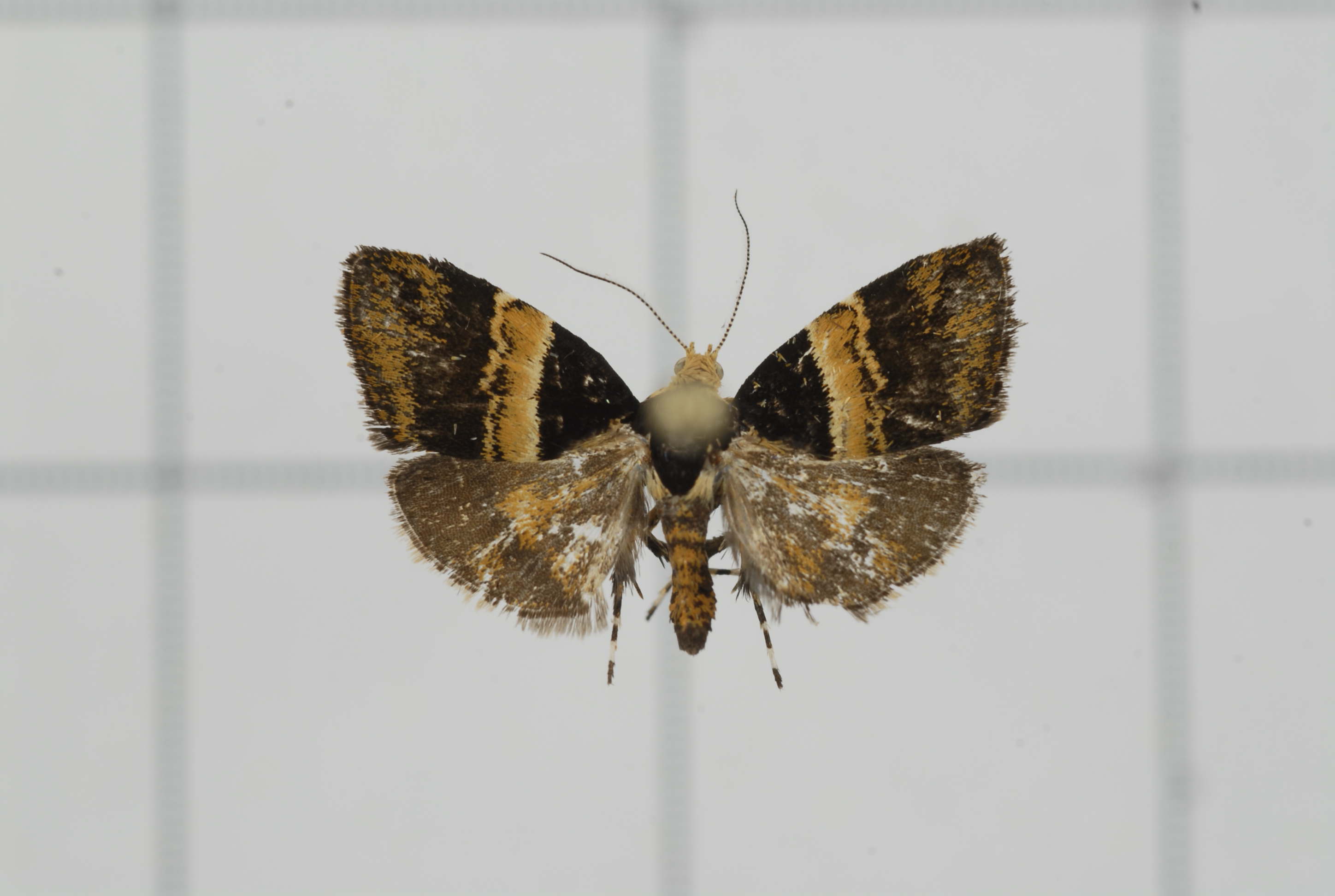

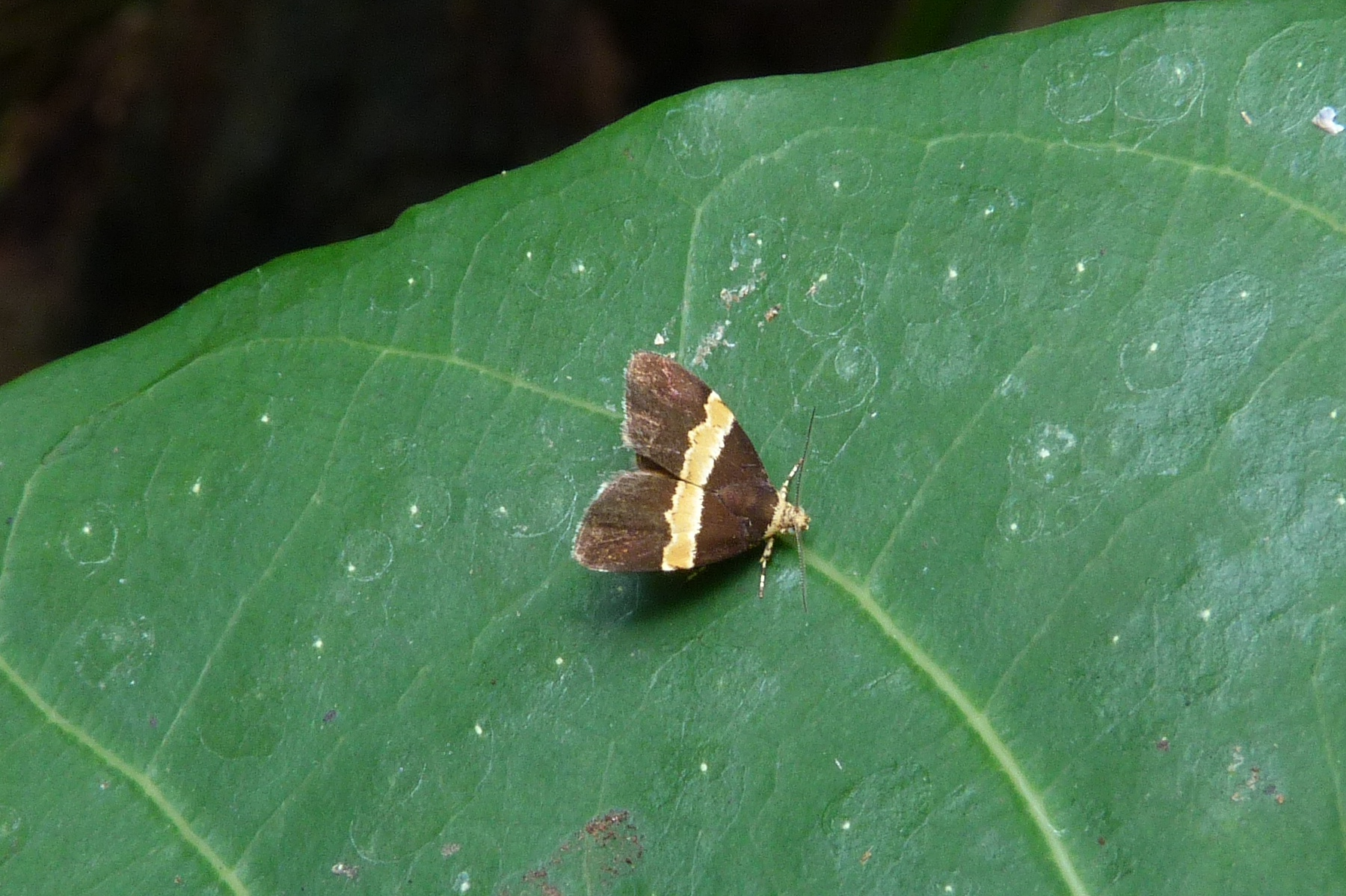

Scientific classification
- Kingdom: Animalia
- Phylum: Arthropoda
- Clade: Pancrustacea
- Class: Insecta
- Order: Lepidoptera
- Family: Choreutidae
- Genus: Choreutis
- Species: C. basalis

Binomial name
- Choreutis basalis (R. Felder & Rogenhofer, 1875)

Synonyms
- Simaethis basalis Felder & Rogenhofer, 1875; Simaethis chionodesma Lower, 1896

= Choreutis basalis =

Species of metalmark moth

Choreutis basalis is a species of moth of the family Choreutidae. It is found in eastern Queensland, from Cape York to Yeppoon. It is also present in New Guinea and Indonesia.

Adults have dark brown wings.
