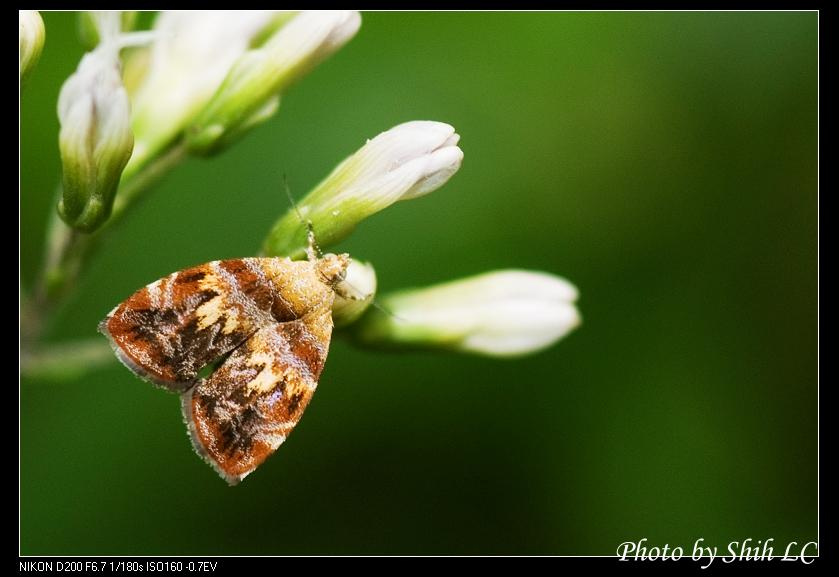

Scientific classification
- Kingdom: Animalia
- Phylum: Arthropoda
- Clade: Pancrustacea
- Class: Insecta
- Order: Lepidoptera
- Family: Choreutidae
- Genus: Choreutis
- Species: C. sexfasciella

Binomial name
- Choreutis sexfasciella (Sauber, 1902)

Synonyms
- Choreutidia sexfasciella Sauber, 1902; Simaethis fulminea Meyrick, 1912; Simaethis emplecta Turner, 1942; Choreutis emplecta (Turner, 1942); Choreutis sexfassiella Arita, 1976 (Missp.); Choreutis sexfasilla Abu Ghonem et al., 2020 (Missp.); Choreutis sexfascilla Abu Ghonem et al., 2020 (Missp.)

= Choreutis sexfasciella =

Species of metalmark moth

Choreutis sexfasciella is a moth in the family Choreutidae. It was described by Sauber in 1902. This species occurs naturally in Sri Lanka, Japan (Ogasawara), Taiwan, the Philippines, Java, and Australia, and has been introduced to California and Florida. In much of the literature, it has been referred to as Choreutis emplecta.
