= Choreutis ophiosema =

Scientific classification
- Kingdom: Animalia
- Phylum: Arthropoda
- Clade: Pancrustacea
- Class: Insecta
- Order: Lepidoptera
- Family: Choreutidae
- Genus: Choreutis
- Species: C. ophiosema

Binomial name
- Choreutis ophiosema (Lower, 1896)

Synonyms
- Simaethis ophiosema Lower, 1896; Anthophila ophiosema; Eutromula ophiosema; Anthophila regularis Pagenstecher, 1884

Species of metalmark moth

Choreutis ophiosema is a species of moth of the family Choreutidae first described by Oswald Bertram Lower in 1896. It is found in India, Sri Lanka, China, Taiwan, Amoy, the Moluccas, eastern Australia (the Northern Territory and Queensland) and Japan.

The wingspan is about 10 mm.

Larvae feed on Bambusa species.
