= List of moths of Indonesia =

The following is a list of a few of the moths of Indonesia. It is estimated that there are approximately 10,000 moth species in Indonesia.

== Family Choreutidae ==
- Brenthia caelicola
- Brenthia salaconia
- Brenthia spintheristis
- Anthophila achyrodes (Meyrick, 1912)(from Buru island)

== Family Crambidae ==
=== Subfamily Pyraustinae ===
- Heterocnephes lymphatalis

=== Subfamily Spilomelinae ===
- Hodebertia testalis
- Palpita nigricollis
- Rhimphalea ochalis

== Depressariidae ==
- Odites duodaca Diakonoff, 1948 (from Buru island)

== Family Erebidae ==
=== Subfamily Arctiinae ===
- Asota kinabaluensis
- Baroa siamica
- Creatonotos gangis
- Creatonotos transiens
- Eugoa trifascia

=== Subfamily Calpinae ===
- Gespanna pectoralis
- Heterospila nigripalpis
- Phyllodes eyndhovii
- Phyllodes staudingeri
- Phyllodes verhuelli
- Plusiodonta calcaurea
- Plusiodonta coelonota
- Rectipalpula billeti
- Rhynchodina molybdota
- Tamba delicata
- Tamba mnionomera
- Tamba ochra
- Throana lasiocera

=== Subfamily Erebinae ===
- Ercheia multilinea
- Ophiusa indistincta
- Platyja umbrina
- Pterocyclophora ridleyi
- Tochara olivacea

== Family Eupterotidae ==
- Eupterote kalliesi

== Family Geometridae ==
- Abaciscus costimacula
- Agathia obsoleta
- Amraica solivagaria
- Auzeodes chalybeata
- Bytharia uniformis
- Cassyma chrotadelpha
- Celerena mutata
- Craspedosis melanura
- Chrysocraspeda abhadraca
- Chrysocraspeda convergens
- Chrysocraspeda mitigata
- Chrysocraspeda plumbeofusa
- Cyclophora heydena
- Cyclophora rotundata
- Derxena nivea
- Dilophodes elegans
- Plutodes flavescens
- Hypochrosis cryptopyrrhata
- Hypochrosis pyrrhophaeata
- Hyposidra aquilaria
- Hyposidra infixaria
- Hyposidra violescens
- Iulotrichia decursaria
- Krananda lucidaria
- Omiza lycoraria
- Ophthalmitis basiscripta
- Ophthalmitis cordularioides
- Ophthalmitis viridior
- Ozola liwana
- Ruttellerona lithina
- Sarcinodes reductatus
- Sarcinodes sumatraria
- Zeheba aureatoides

== Family Heliodinidae ==
- Sobareutis conchophanes

== Immidae ==
- Imma iota Diakonoff, 1948 (from Buru island)

== Family Limacodidae ==
- Barisania lampra

== Family Noctuidae ==
=== Subfamily Hadeninae ===
- Clethrorasa pilcheri
- Dyrzela plagiata
- Mudaria luteileprosa

== Family Nolidae ==
- Plagerepne torquata
- Risoba becki
- Risoba calainodes
- Risoba diehli
- Risoba diphtheropsis
- Risoba helbaueri
- Risoba hiemischi
- Risoba hollowayi
- Risoba menhoferi
- Risoba rafflesae
- Risoba rothei
- Risoba sticticata
- Risoba wittstadti

== Family Notodontidae ==
- Oxoia smaragdiplena
- Parasinga lichenina
- Syntypistis palladina
- Tarsolepis malayana

== Family Pterophoridae ==
- Xyroptila falciformis

== Family Saturniidae ==
- Cricula trifenestrata

== Family Sphingidae ==
- Angonyx kai
- Macroglossum belis
- Megacorma obliqua

== Family Thyrididae ==
- Epaena complicatalis
- Hypolamrus taphiusalis
- Rhodoneura acaciusalis
- Rhodoneura pudicula

== Family Uraniidae ==
- Stesichora puellaria
