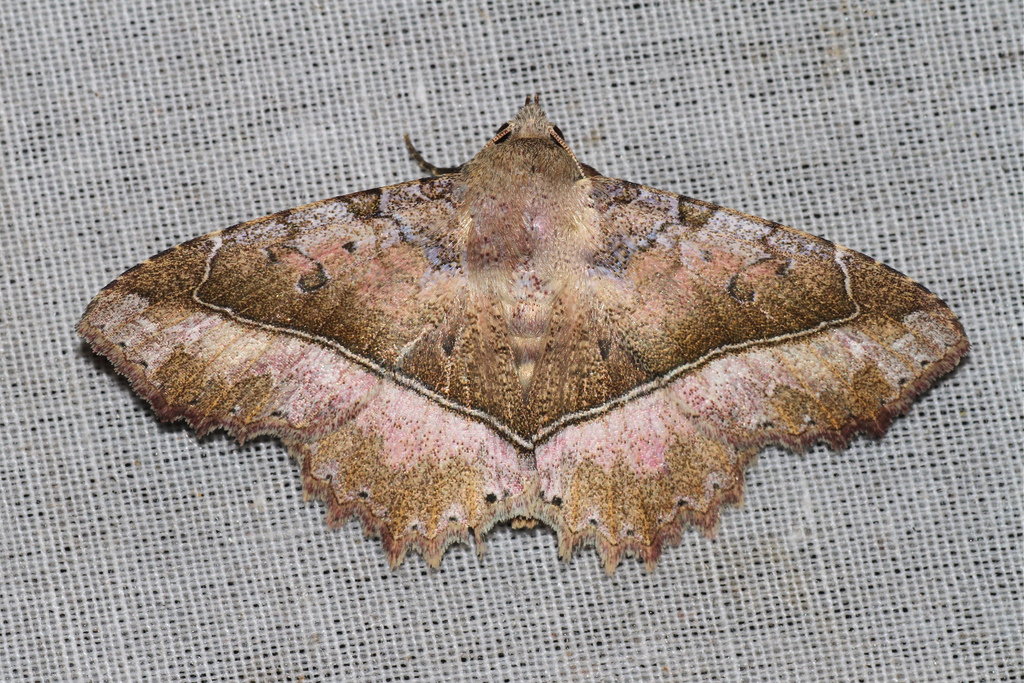
- Bornean specimen from hill mixed dipterocarp forest

Scientific classification
- Kingdom: Animalia
- Phylum: Arthropoda
- Clade: Pancrustacea
- Class: Insecta
- Order: Lepidoptera
- Superfamily: Noctuoidea
- Family: Erebidae
- Genus: Tamba
- Species: T. dichroma

Binomial name
- Tamba dichroma Prout, 1932

= Tamba dichroma =

Species of moth

Tamba dichroma is a noctuoid moth in the family Erebidae first described by Prout in 1932.

== Characteristics ==
This species is really strongly sexually dimorphic.

== Distribution and habitat ==
It is found in Borneo, Sumatra, Peninsular Malaysia, and Thailand. The species is frequent in the lowlands forests.
