= Barisania honeyi =

Scientific classification
- Kingdom: Animalia
- Phylum: Arthropoda
- Class: Insecta
- Order: Lepidoptera
- Family: Limacodidae
- Genus: Barisania
- Species: B. honeyi

Binomial name
- Barisania honeyi Solovyev, 2009

Species of moth

Barisania honeyi is a species of moth of the family Limacodidae. It is found in northern and central Thailand, northern Vietnam and central Burma on altitudes between 320 and 1,650 meters.

The wingspan is 27–33 mm. Adults are on wing in June, August, September, November and December.

== Etymology ==
The species is named for Mr. Martin Honey.
