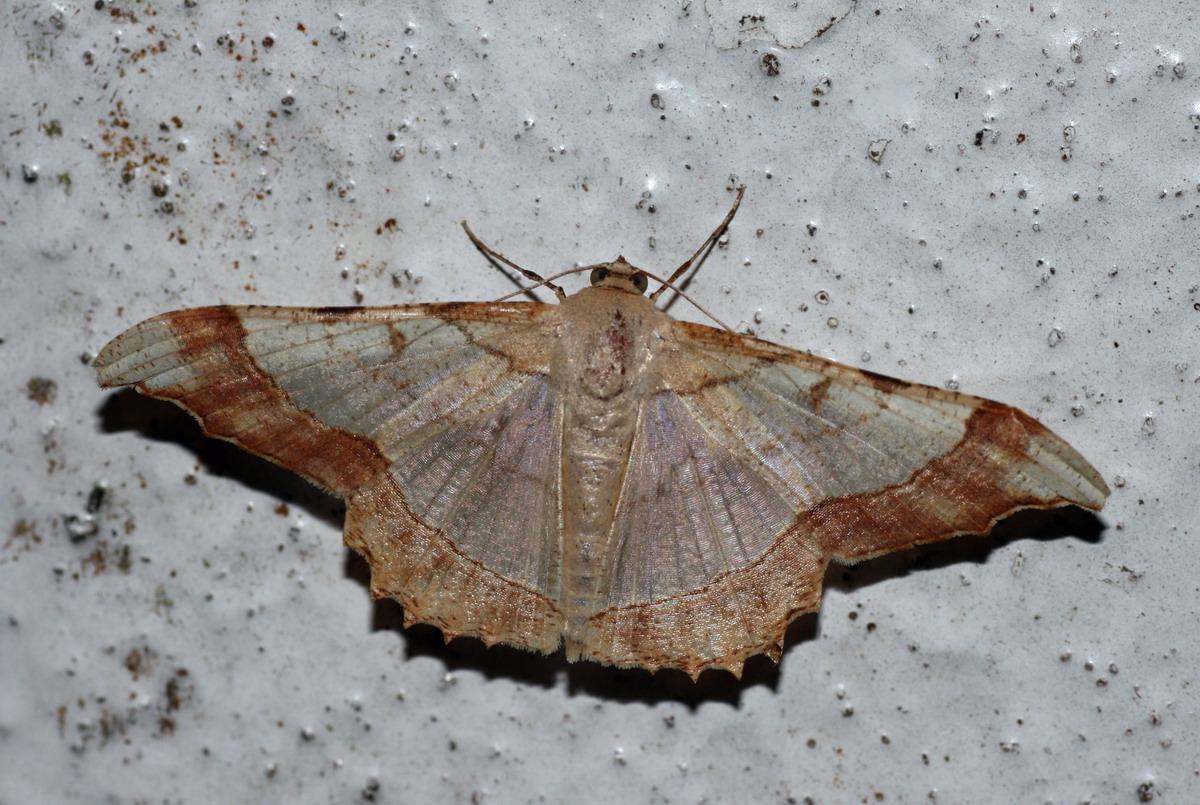
- Zeheba aureatoides - Malaysia, Fraser's Hill

Scientific classification
- Kingdom: Animalia
- Phylum: Arthropoda
- Clade: Pancrustacea
- Class: Insecta
- Order: Lepidoptera
- Family: Geometridae
- Subfamily: Ennominae
- Genus: Zeheba; Moore, [1887]

= Zeheba =

Genus of moths

Zeheba is a genus of moths in the family Geometridae described by Frederic Moore in 1887.

== Species ==
- Zeheba lucidata (Walker, 1862) Borneo, Sumatra
- Zeheba aureata Moore, [1887] Himalayas, Sumatra
- Zeheba marginata Walker Java, Bali
- Zeheba aureatoides Holloway, 1993 Borneo, Peninsular Malaysia, Sulawesi
- Zeheba spectabilis (Butler, 1877) Australia
