= Rhimphalea sceletalis =

Scientific classification
- Kingdom: Animalia
- Phylum: Arthropoda
- Class: Insecta
- Order: Lepidoptera
- Family: Crambidae
- Genus: Rhimphalea
- Species: R. sceletalis

Binomial name
- Rhimphalea sceletalis Lederer, 1863

Synonyms
- Rhimphalea aenone Butler, 1886

Species of moth

Rhimphalea sceletalis is a small moth in the family Crambidae that is found in Queensland in Australia and in Papua New Guinea. The species was first described by Julius Lederer in 1863.
