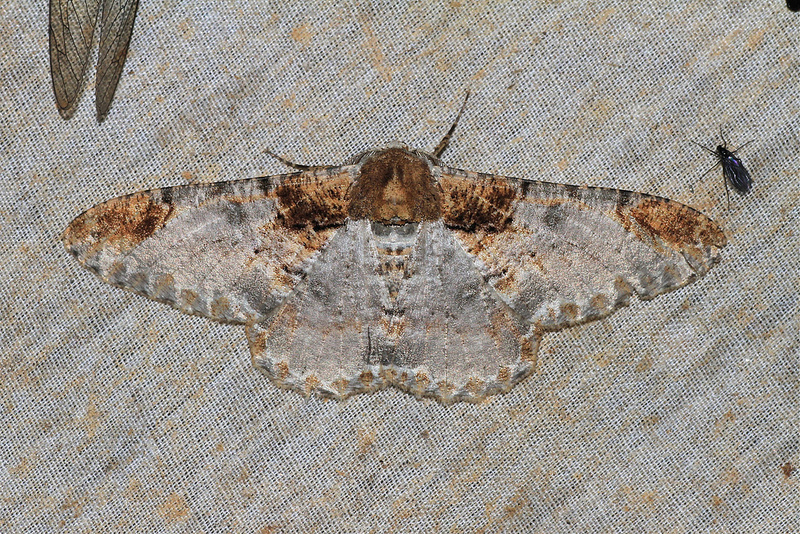
- Amraica solivagaria

Scientific classification
- Kingdom: Animalia
- Phylum: Arthropoda
- Class: Insecta
- Order: Lepidoptera
- Family: Geometridae
- Tribe: Boarmiini
- Genus: Amraica; Moore, 1888

= Amraica =

Genus of geometer moths

Amraica is a genus of moths in the family Geometridae.

== Species ==
- Amraica debrunnescens (Prout, 1926)
- Amraica ponderata Felder
- Amraica praeparva Prout
- Amraica recursaria (Walker, 1860)
- Amraica solivagaria (Walker, 1866)
- Amraica superans (Butler, 1878)
