= Tamba lineifera =

Scientific classification
- Kingdom: Animalia
- Phylum: Arthropoda
- Class: Insecta
- Order: Lepidoptera
- Superfamily: Noctuoidea
- Family: Erebidae
- Genus: Tamba
- Species: T. lineifera

Binomial name
- Tamba lineifera Walker, 1865

Species of moth

Tamba lineifera is a moth of the family Erebidae.
