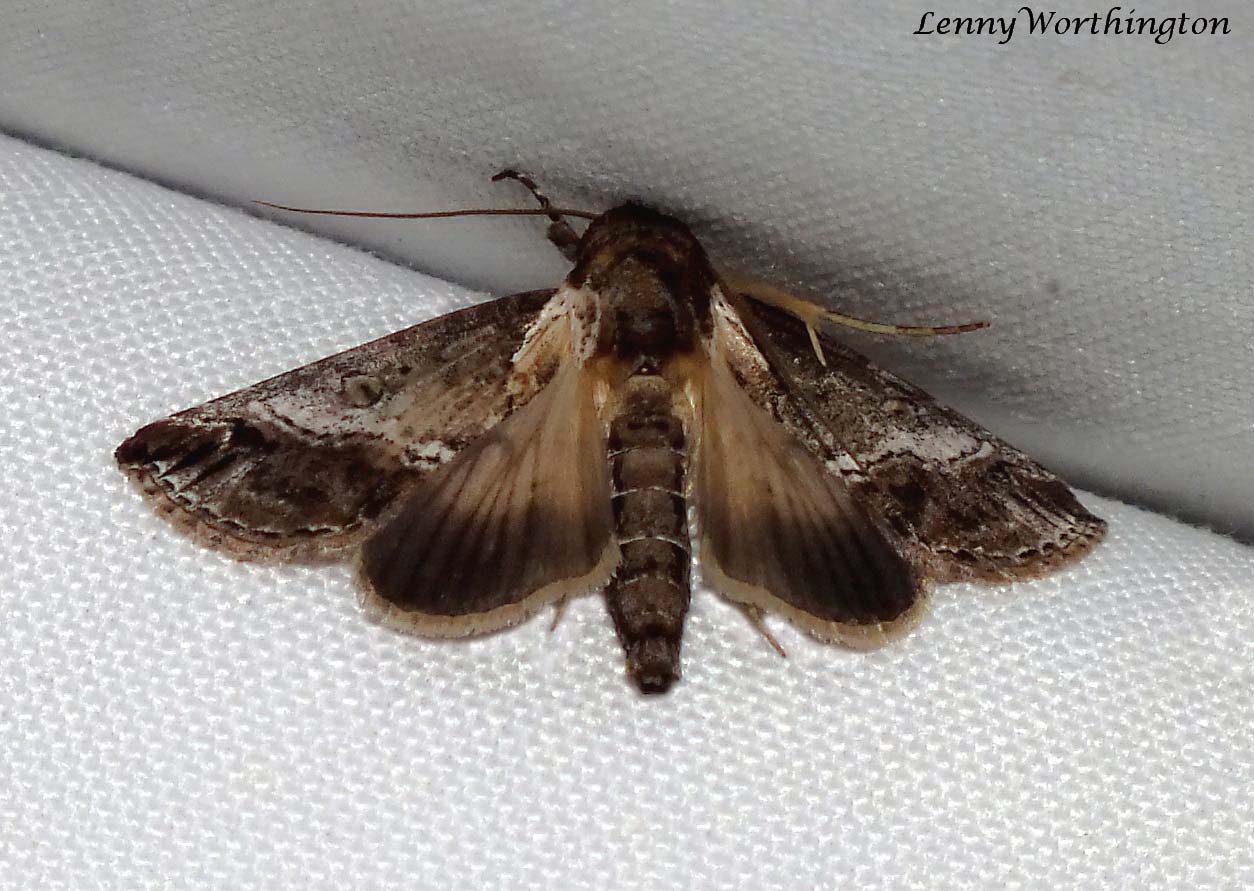

Scientific classification
- Kingdom: Animalia
- Phylum: Arthropoda
- Clade: Pancrustacea
- Class: Insecta
- Order: Lepidoptera
- Superfamily: Noctuoidea
- Family: Nolidae
- Genus: Risoba
- Species: R. obstructa

Binomial name
- Risoba obstructa Moore, 1881

Synonyms
- Risoba grisea Bethune-Baker, 1906; Crioa albifusa Turner, 1942

= Risoba obstructa =

Species of moth

Risoba obstructa is a species of moth of the family Nolidae first described by Frederic Moore in 1881.

== Distribution ==
Its distribution ranges from Sri Lanka and India to the Philippines, Solomon Islands and Australia.

== Description ==
Its wingspan is about 28–36 mm. Head and thorax brown. The tegulae are whitish. Forewings whitish sprinkled with brown. There is an oblique white basal band, and red-brown costal area just beyond it. Reniform round with a dark speck at center. A postmedial oblique double line slightly incurved below vein 4 and the area beyond it red brown with traces of a sub-marginal waved line. Some apical dark specks and a series of marginal brown and white specks can be seen. Hindwings are semihyaline white with broad brown marginal band.

Larva purplish brown with pale sides. Dorsal and lateral white speckled line and a sub-basal whitish streak series can be seen. A series of black dots found between lateral and sub-lateral lines. There is a conical prominence on anal somite.

== Ecology ==
The larva has been recorded on Quisqualis sp., Terminalia sp., Xylia sp., Lagerstroemia sp. and Sterculia sp.
