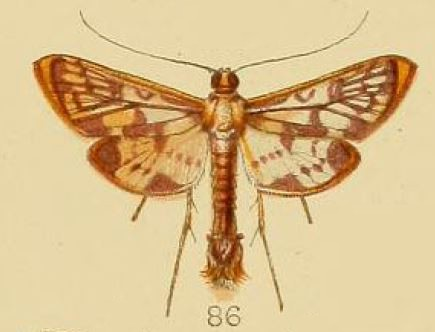

Scientific classification
- Kingdom: Animalia
- Phylum: Arthropoda
- Class: Insecta
- Order: Lepidoptera
- Family: Crambidae
- Genus: Rhimphalea
- Species: R. linealis

Binomial name
- Rhimphalea linealis Kenrick, 1907

= Rhimphalea linealis =

Species of moth

Rhimphalea linealis is a small moth in the family Crambidae that is found in Papua New Guinea. The species was first described by George Hamilton Kenrick in 1907.

It has a wingspan of 30 mm.
