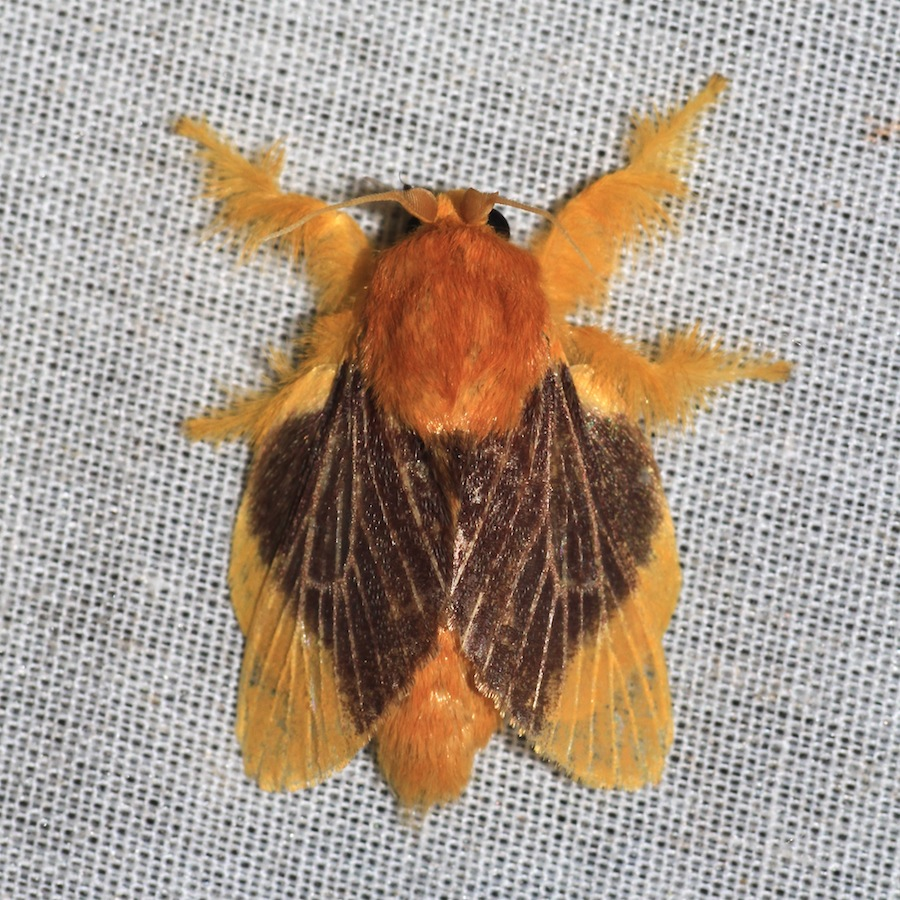

Scientific classification
- Kingdom: Animalia
- Phylum: Arthropoda
- Clade: Pancrustacea
- Class: Insecta
- Order: Lepidoptera
- Family: Limacodidae
- Genus: Barisania; Holloway, 1990

= Barisania =

Barisania lampra

Genus of moths

Barisania is a genus of moths of the family Limacodidae.

== Species ==
- Barisania lampra (West, 1937)
- Barisania honeyi (Solovyev, 2009)
