= Rhimphalea anoxantha =

Scientific classification
- Kingdom: Animalia
- Phylum: Arthropoda
- Class: Insecta
- Order: Lepidoptera
- Family: Crambidae
- Genus: Rhimphalea
- Species: R. anoxantha

Binomial name
- Rhimphalea anoxantha Hampson, 1912

Species of moth

Rhimphalea anoxantha is a moth in the family Crambidae. It was described by George Hampson in 1912. It is found in New Guinea.

The wingspan is 28 mm. The forewings are black-brown with a cupreous gloss and with two slight yellowish-white streaks below the base of the costa, as well as an oblique yellowish-white antemedial band from the cell to the inner margin. There is a wedge-shaped yellowish-white spot in the end of the cell, a yellowish-white discoidal bar and three yellowish-white spots between the lower angle of the cell and the inner margin. There are yellowish-white streaks beyond the upper angle of the cell above and below vein 7. The postmedial line is yellowish white. The hindwings are yellowish white, with some blackish at the base and a large blackish discoidal spot. There is a slight postmedial line excurved between veins 5 and 2. The terminal area is blackish.
