= Risoba malagasy =

Scientific classification
- Kingdom: Animalia
- Phylum: Arthropoda
- Class: Insecta
- Order: Lepidoptera
- Superfamily: Noctuoidea
- Family: Nolidae
- Genus: Risoba
- Species: R. malagasy

Binomial name
- Risoba malagasy (Viette, 1965)

Synonyms
- Gigantoceras malagasy Viette, 1965

Species of moth

Risoba malagasy is a species of moth of the family Nolidae first described by Pierre Viette in 1965. It is found in Toliara in south-west Madagascar.
