= Rhimphalea trogusalis =

Scientific classification
- Kingdom: Animalia
- Phylum: Arthropoda
- Class: Insecta
- Order: Lepidoptera
- Family: Crambidae
- Genus: Rhimphalea
- Species: R. trogusalis

Binomial name
- Rhimphalea trogusalis (Walker, 1859)

Synonyms
- Botys trogusalis Walker, 1859; Botys megalopsalis Walker, [1866]; Pinacia ocularis Felder & Rogenhofer, 1875; Spilomela ommatalis Snellen, 1880

Species of moth

Rhimphalea trogusalis is a moth in the family Crambidae. It was described by Francis Walker in 1859. It is found in the Himalayas, Assam, India, the Philippines, Borneo and Sulawesi.
