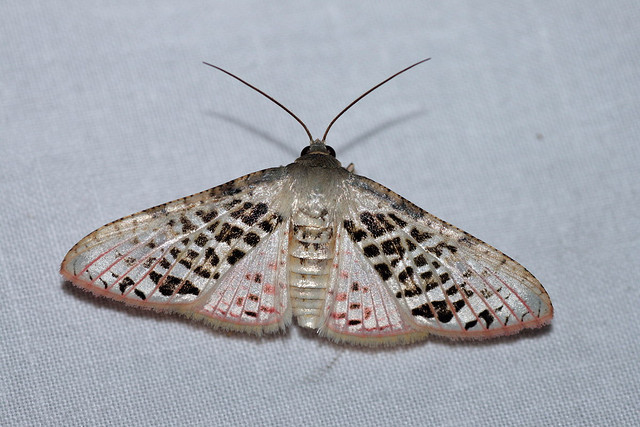
- Rhodoneura pudicula

Scientific classification
- Kingdom: Animalia
- Phylum: Arthropoda
- Class: Insecta
- Order: Lepidoptera
- Family: Thyrididae
- Subfamily: Siculodinae
- Tribe: Rhodoneurini
- Genus: Rhodoneura; Guenée, 1858

Synonyms
- Osca Walker, 1863 (preocc.)

= Rhodoneura =

Genus of moths

Rhodoneura is a genus of moths of the family Thyrididae described by Achille Guenée in 1858.

== Description ==
Palpi straight, upturned, reaching above vertex of head. Third joint variable in length. Forewings slightly produced and acute at apex. Forewings with veins 6 to 10 given off to the angle of cell. Hindwings with vein 5 from just above lower angle of cell.

== Type species ==
- Rhodoneura pudicula Guenée, 1858

== Species ==
Some species of this genus are:

- Rhodoneura acaciusalis (Walker, 1859)
- Rhodoneura aurata (Butler, 1882)
- Rhodoneura cuprea (Butler, 1882)
- Rhodoneura abacha Whalley, 1971
- Rhodoneura discopis Hampson, 1910
- Rhodoneura disjuncta (Gaede, 1929)
- Rhodoneura disparalis Hampson, 1910
- Rhodoneura elegantula Viette, 1957
- Rhodoneura fallax (Warren, 1896)
- Rhodoneura flavicilia Hampson, 1906
- Rhodoneura intimalis (Moore, 1888)
- Rhodoneura lacunosa Whalley, 1971
- Rhodoneura limatula Whalley, 1967
- Rhodoneura marojejy Viette, 1960
- Rhodoneura mellea (Saalmüller, 1881)
- Rhodoneura mescememna Dyar, 1914
- Rhodoneura molecula (Dyar, 1914)
- Rhodoneura multiguttata (Hampson, 1906)
- Rhodoneura nitens (Butler, 1887)
- Rhodoneura opalinula (Mabille, 1879)
- Rhodoneura pammicra Dyar, 1914
- Rhodoneura postponens (Dyar, 1914)
- Rhodoneura pudicula Guenée, 1858
- Rhodoneura roseola Whalley, 1971
- Rhodoneura serraticornis (Warren, 1899)
- Rhodoneura seyrigi (Viette, 1957)
- Rhodoneura sordidula (Plötz, 1880)
- Rhodoneura strix Viette, 1958
- Rhodoneura superba (Viette, 1954)
- Rhodoneura terreola (Mabille, 1880)
- Rhodoneura translucida Viette, 1954
- Rhodoneura viettealis Whalley, 1977
- Rhodoneura werneburgalis (Keferstein, 1870)
- Rhodoneura zophocrana Viette, 1957
- Rhodoneura zurisana Whalley, 1971
