= Rhimphalea lindusalis =

Scientific classification
- Kingdom: Animalia
- Phylum: Arthropoda
- Class: Insecta
- Order: Lepidoptera
- Family: Crambidae
- Genus: Rhimphalea
- Species: R. lindusalis

Binomial name
- Rhimphalea lindusalis (Walker, 1859)

Synonyms
- Botys lindusalis Walker, 1859

Species of moth

Rhimphalea lindusalis is a moth in the family Crambidae. It was described by Francis Walker in 1859. It is found on Borneo, the Solomon Islands and Australia, where it has been recorded from Queensland.
