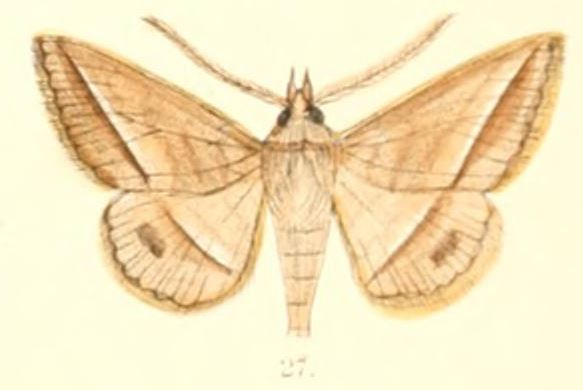
- Tochara creberrima

Scientific classification
- Domain: Eukaryota
- Kingdom: Animalia
- Phylum: Arthropoda
- Class: Insecta
- Order: Lepidoptera
- Superfamily: Noctuoidea
- Family: Erebidae
- Subfamily: Erebinae
- Genus: Tochara; Moore, 1882

= Tochara =

Genus of moths

Tochara is a genus of moths of the family Erebidae.

This genus resembles Hypospila with the differences of a long, bipectinated antennae in the male, a longer third segment of the labial palps and a distinctive dark spot on the hindwings.

== Species ==
- Tochara creberrima (Walker, 1858) (from India to Japan and Australia)
- Tochara olivacea (Holloway, 1976) (from Borneo)
