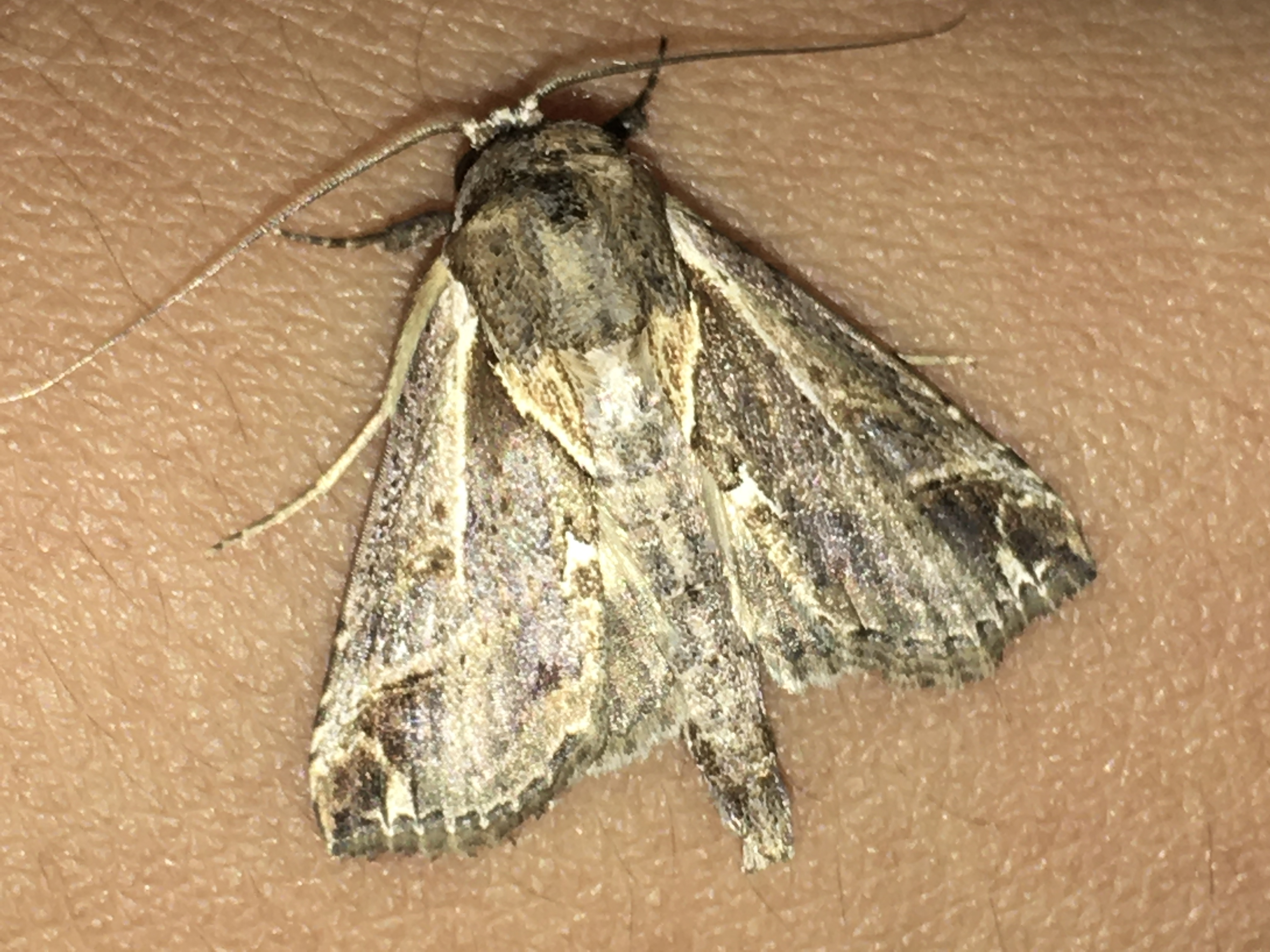
- Newly eclosed adult

Scientific classification
- Kingdom: Animalia
- Phylum: Arthropoda
- Class: Insecta
- Order: Lepidoptera
- Superfamily: Noctuoidea
- Family: Nolidae
- Genus: Risoba
- Species: R. diversipennis

Binomial name
- Risoba diversipennis (Walker, 1858)

Synonyms
- Heliothis diversipennis Walker, 1858

= Risoba diversipennis =

Species of tuft moth

Risoba diversipennis is a species of tuft moth native to the Himalayas, Indochina and to Papua New Guinea. It was described by Francis Walker in 1858. Recorded host plants are Melastoma.

== Gallery ==
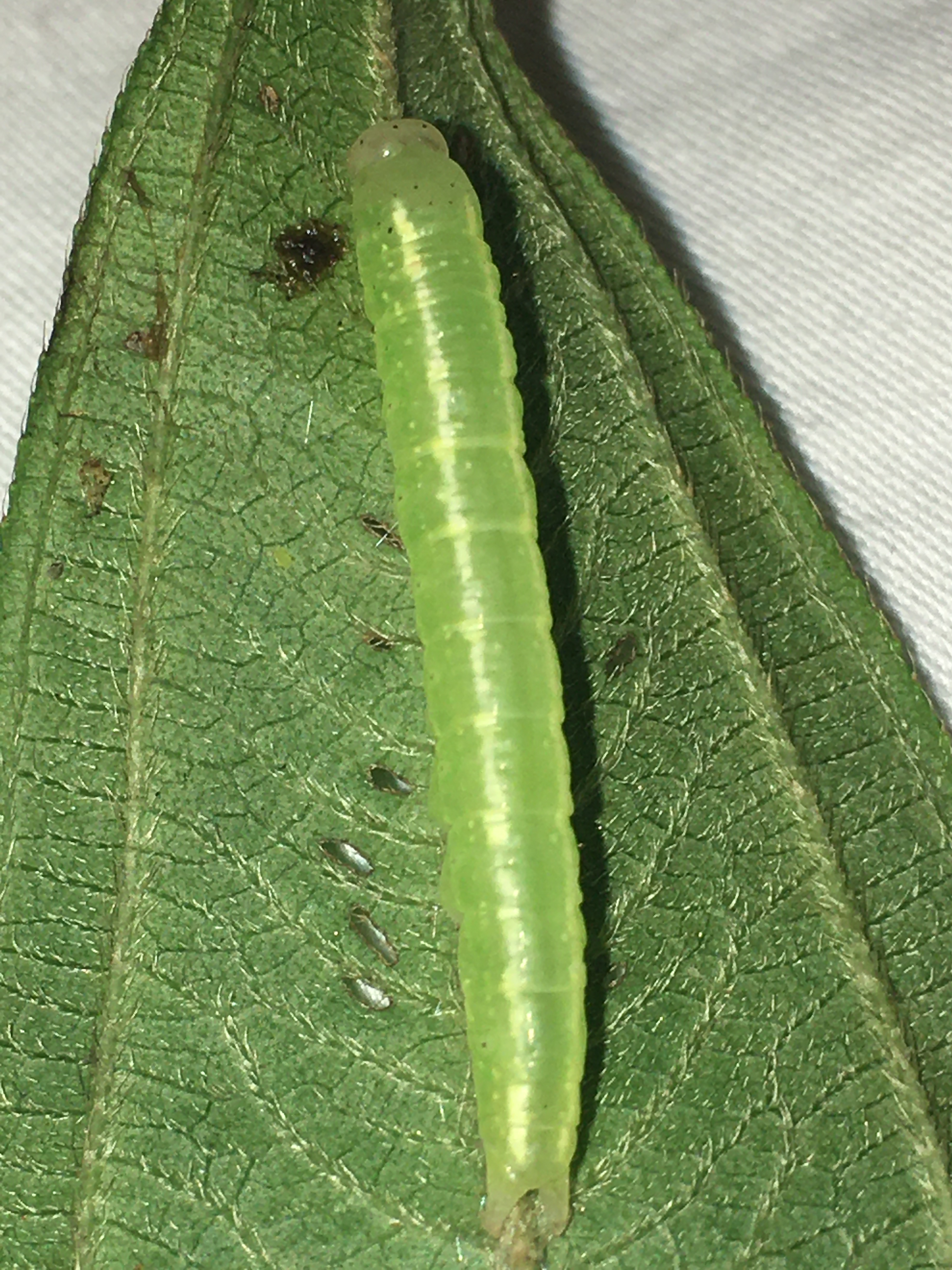
Apolysis

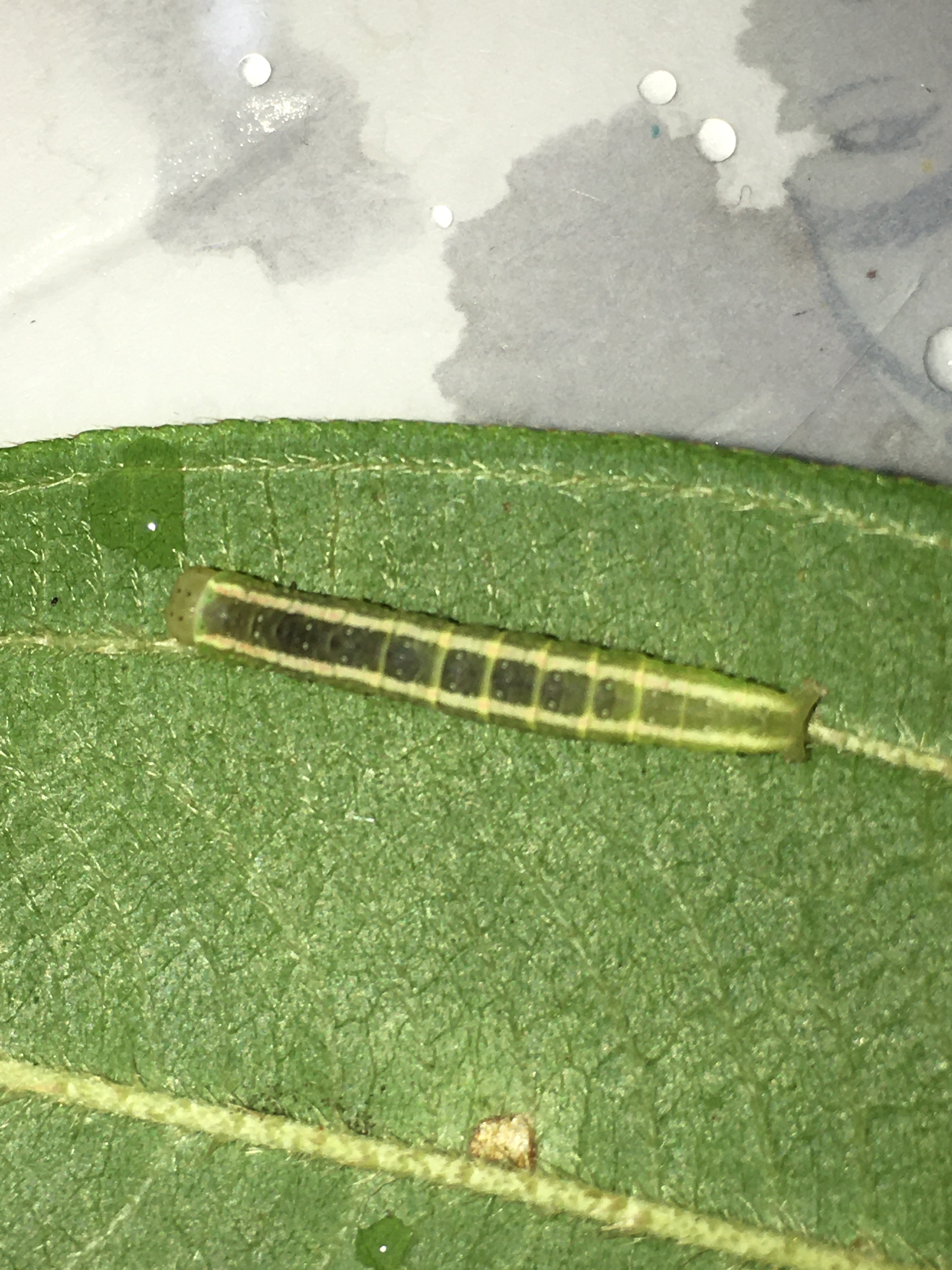
Penultimate instar

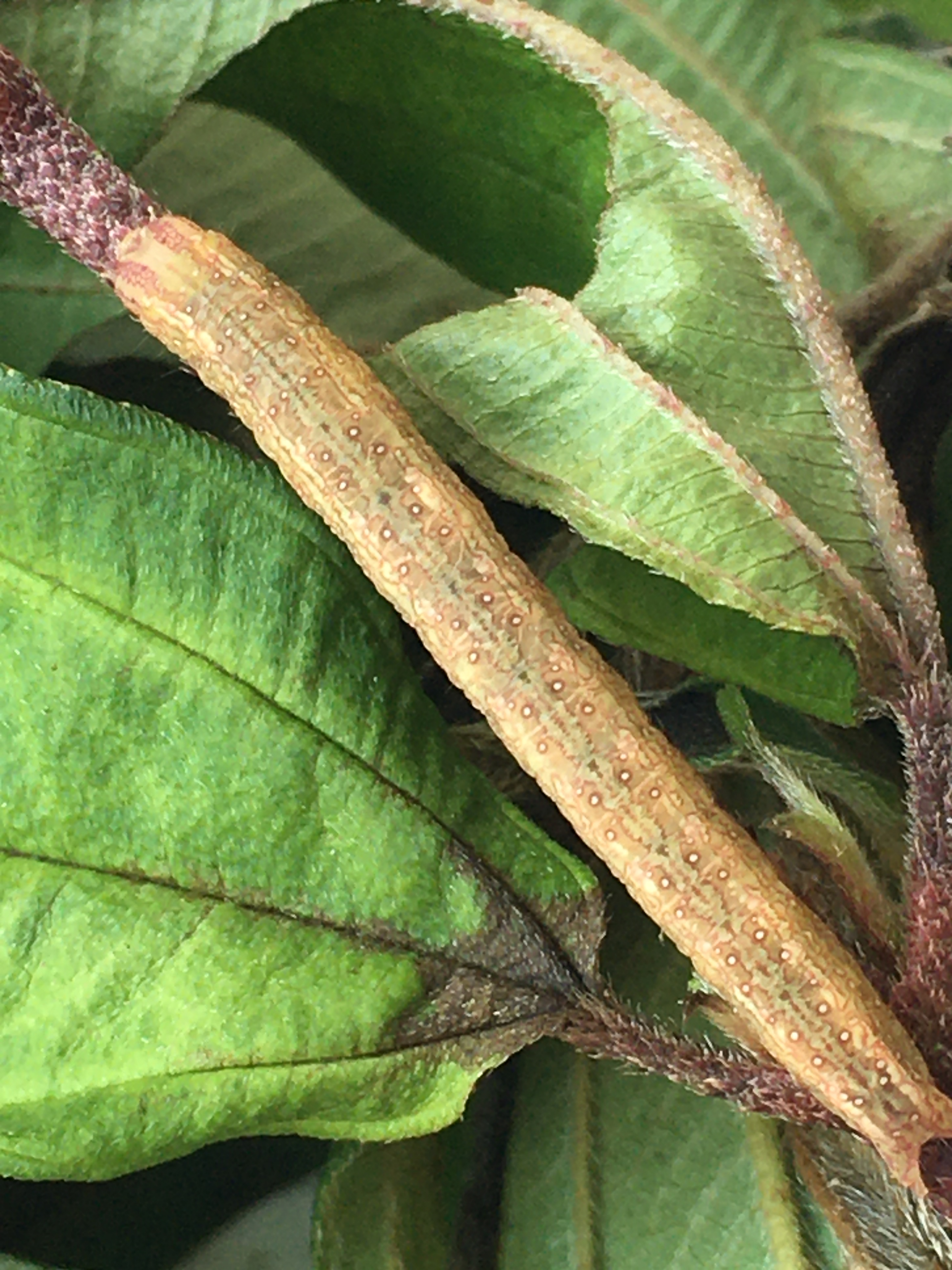
Last instar, maybe mimicking the branches of the host plant (Melastoma)

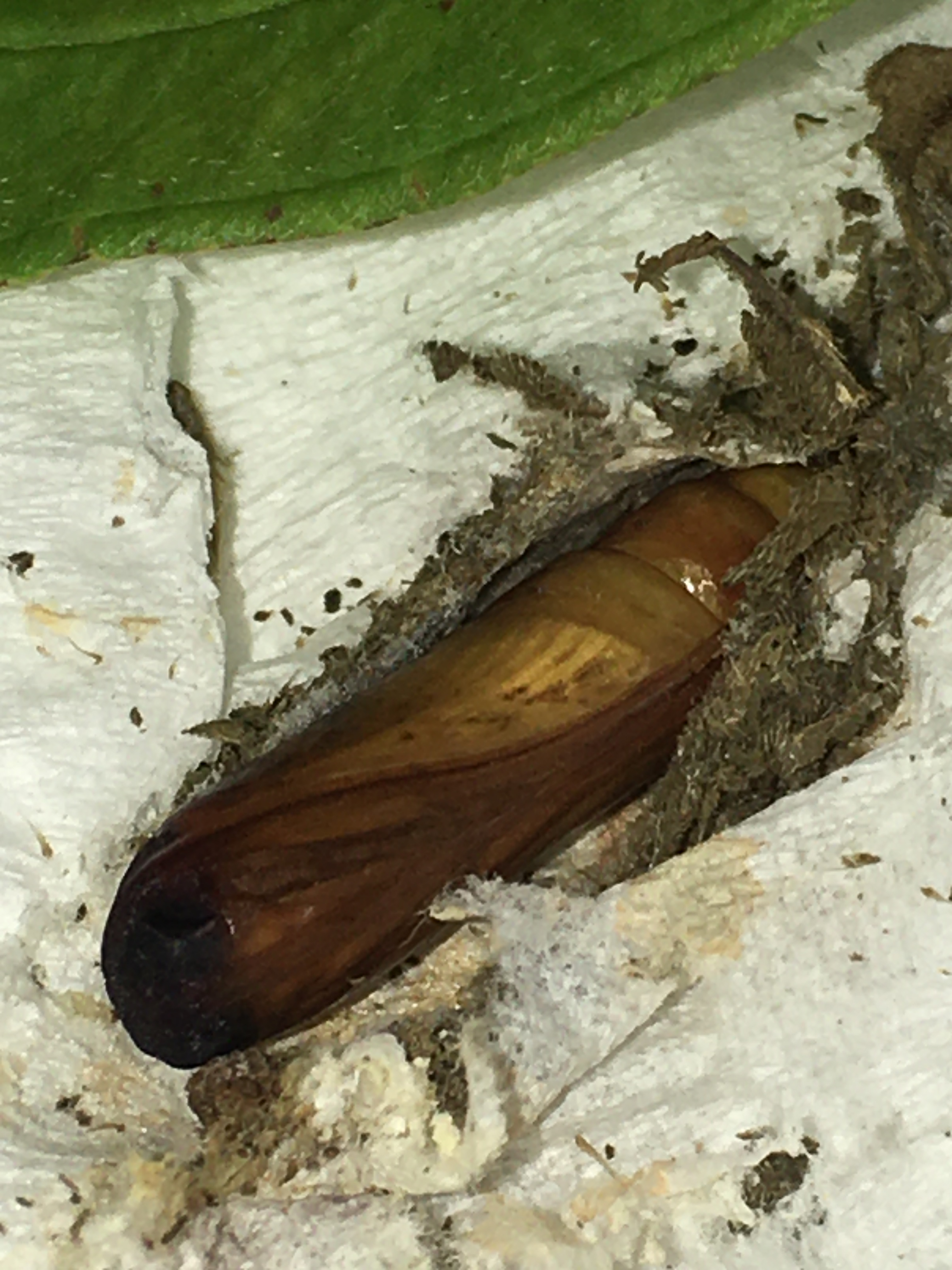
Pupa

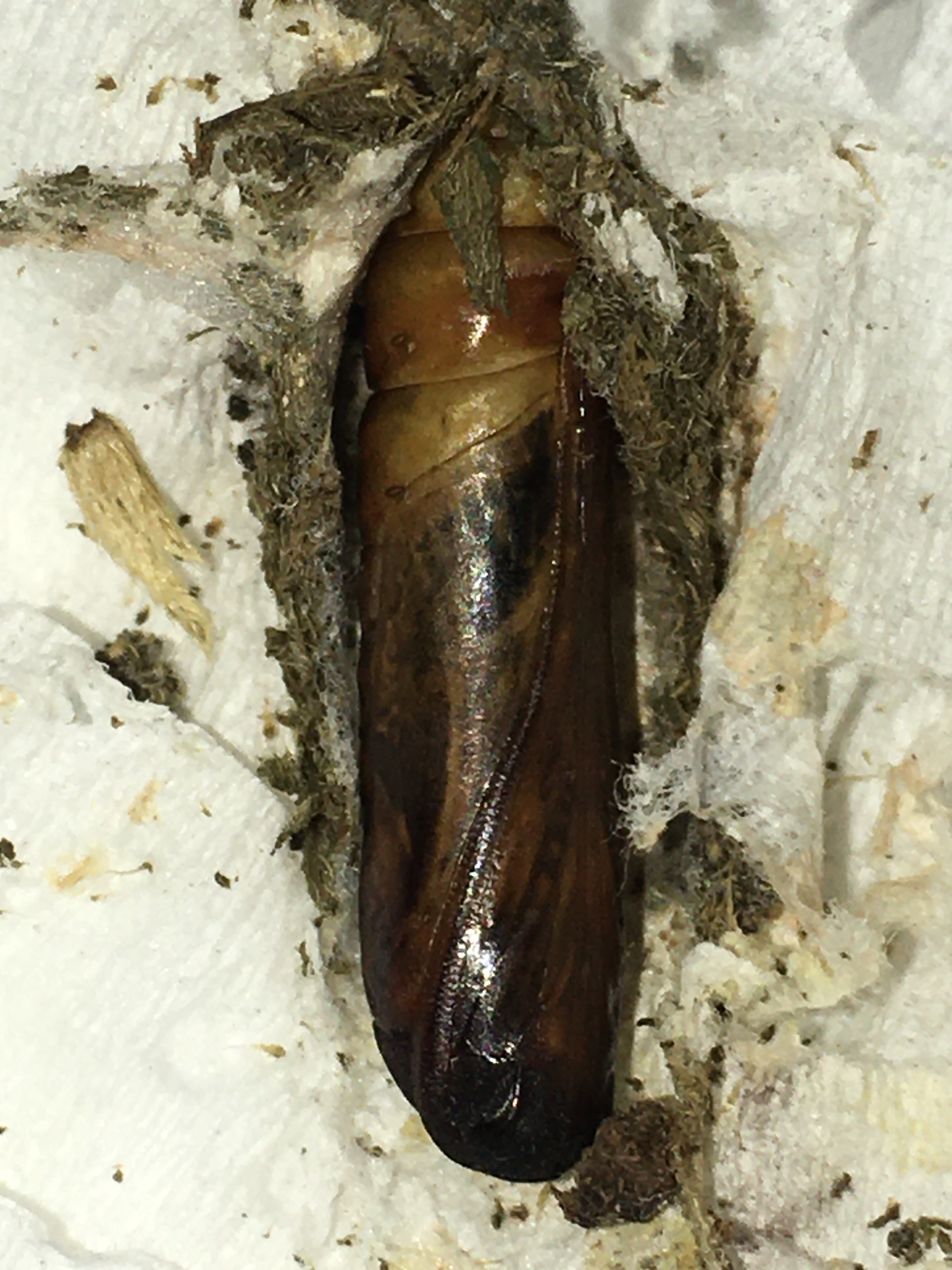
Pupa, near eclosion

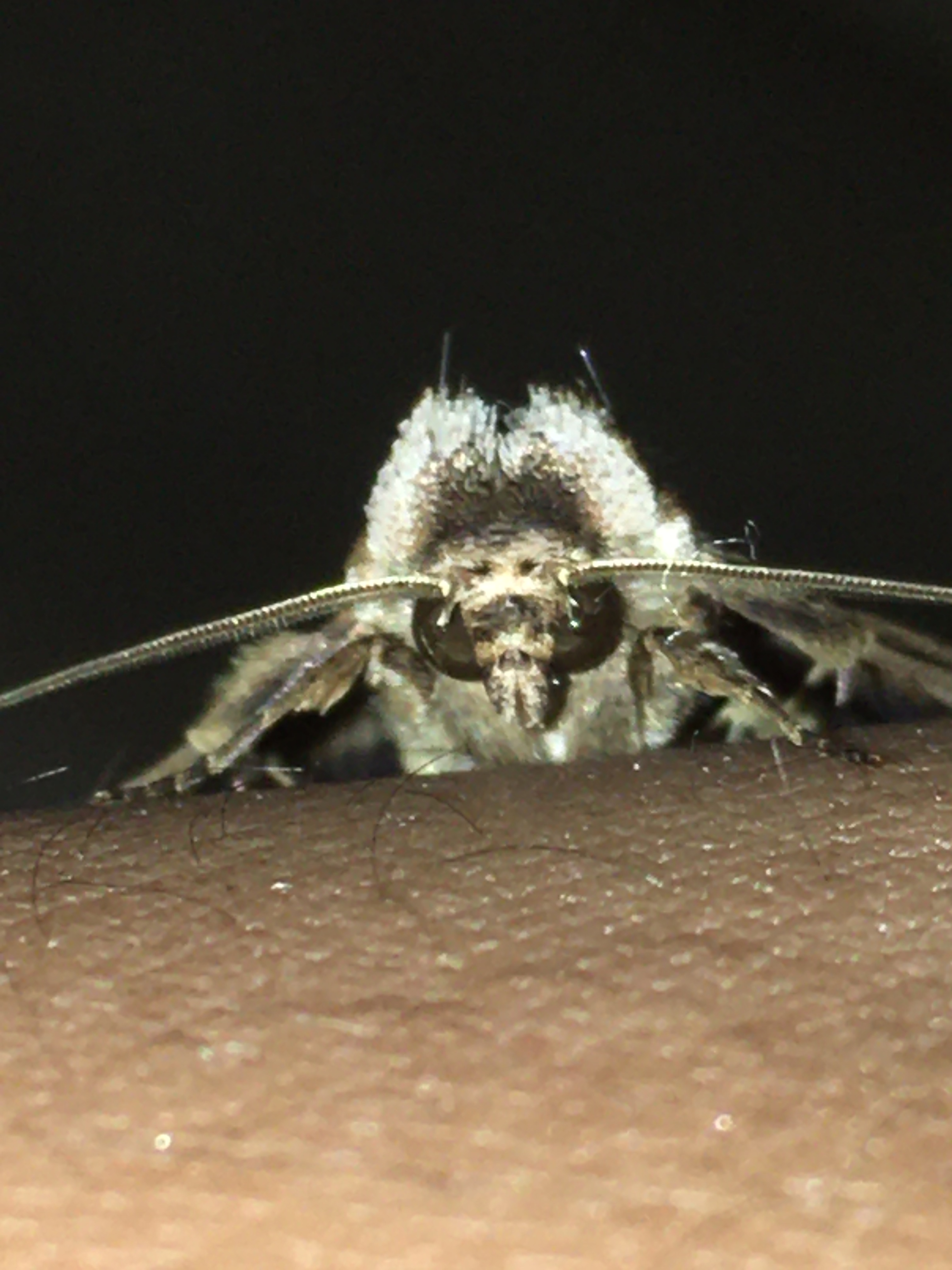
Tufts of the adult Risoba diversipennis
