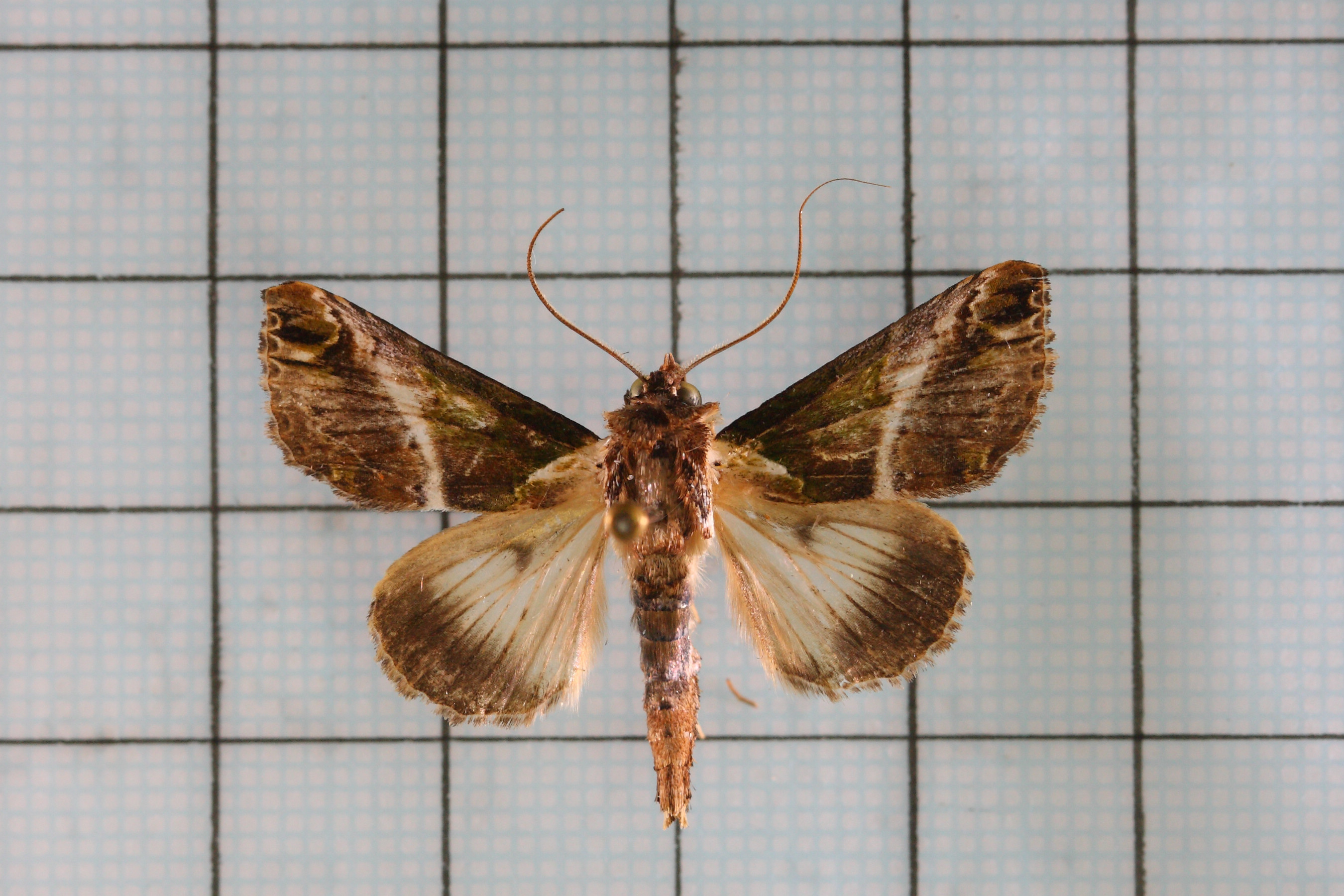

Scientific classification
- Domain: Eukaryota
- Kingdom: Animalia
- Phylum: Arthropoda
- Class: Insecta
- Order: Lepidoptera
- Superfamily: Noctuoidea
- Family: Nolidae
- Genus: Risoba
- Species: R. prominens

Binomial name
- Risoba prominens Moore, 1881

= Risoba prominens =

Species of moth

Risoba prominens is a species of moth of the family Nolidae first described by Frederic Moore in 1881. It is found in India, Sri Lanka, Taiwan, Japan, Vietnam and Sundaland.

The larvae have been recorded feeding on Pterocarya, Melastoma, Myrica and Quisqualis species.
