= Zeheba lucidata =

Scientific classification
- Kingdom: Animalia
- Phylum: Arthropoda
- Clade: Pancrustacea
- Class: Insecta
- Order: Lepidoptera
- Family: Geometridae
- Genus: Zeheba
- Species: Z. lucidata

Binomial name
- Zeheba lucidata (Walker, 1866)

Synonyms
- Macaria lucidata Walker, 1862

Species of moth

Zeheba lucidata is a moth of the family Geometridae first described by Francis Walker in 1866. It is found in the Himalayas and all of Sundaland. Its presence in Sri Lanka is in doubt.

Interior region of wings whitish, whereas wings bordered by a pale brownish broad patch. In male, interior margin of the hindwing is straight, darker and distinctly double.
