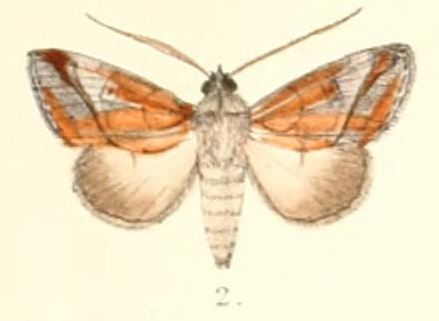

Scientific classification
- Domain: Eukaryota
- Kingdom: Animalia
- Phylum: Arthropoda
- Class: Insecta
- Order: Lepidoptera
- Superfamily: Noctuoidea
- Family: Nolidae
- Genus: Risoba
- Species: R. variegata

Binomial name
- Risoba variegata (Moore, 1882)

Synonyms
- Pitrasa variegata Moore, 1882

= Risoba variegata =

Species of moth

Risoba variegata is a species of moth of the family Nolidae first described by Frederic Moore in 1882. It is found in India.
