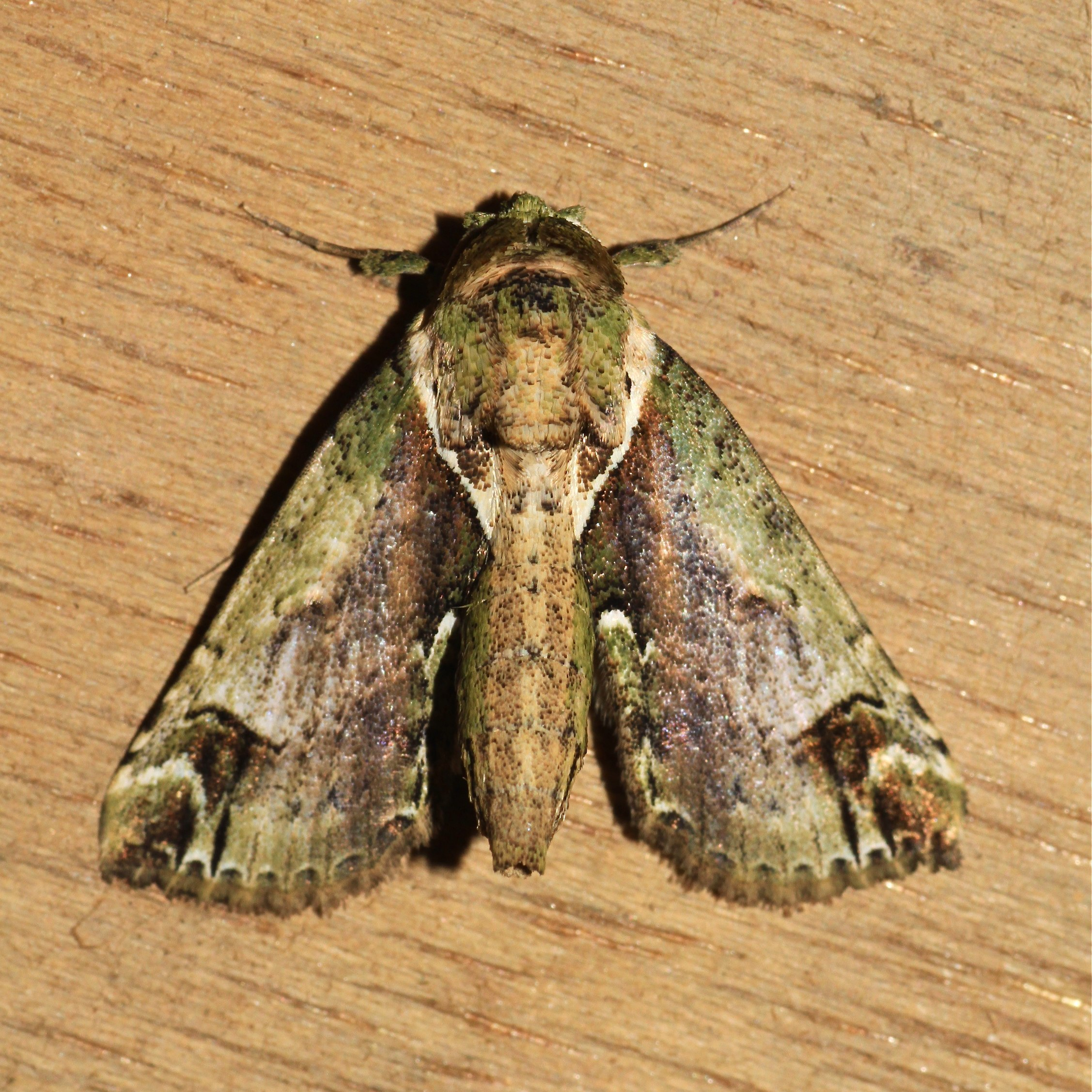

Scientific classification
- Domain: Eukaryota
- Kingdom: Animalia
- Phylum: Arthropoda
- Class: Insecta
- Order: Lepidoptera
- Superfamily: Noctuoidea
- Family: Nolidae
- Genus: Risoba
- Species: R. basalis

Binomial name
- Risoba basalis Moore, 1882

= Risoba basalis =

Species of moth

Risoba basalis is a species of moth of the family Nolidae first described by Frederic Moore in 1882.

== Distribution ==
It is found in India, the Philippines, Taiwan, Vietnam, Sundaland and Sulawesi.

== Biology ==
The larvae have been recorded feeding on Melastoma and Quisualis species.
