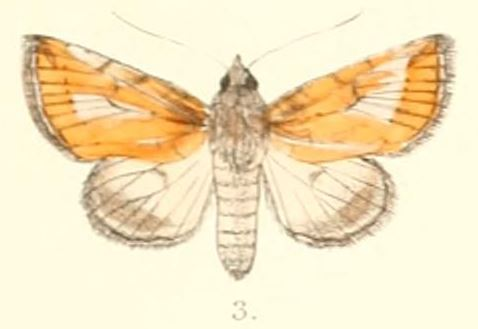

Scientific classification
- Domain: Eukaryota
- Kingdom: Animalia
- Phylum: Arthropoda
- Class: Insecta
- Order: Lepidoptera
- Superfamily: Noctuoidea
- Family: Nolidae
- Genus: Risoba
- Species: R. vitellina

Binomial name
- Risoba vitellina (Moore, 1882)

Synonyms
- Pitrasa vitellina Moore, 1882

= Risoba vitellina =

Species of moth

Risoba vitellina is a species of moth of the family Nolidae first described by Frederic Moore in 1882. It is found in India.
