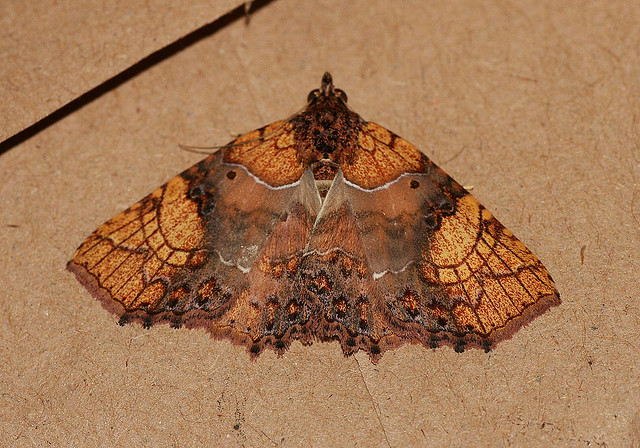
- Specimen from Peninsular Malaysia

Scientific classification
- Kingdom: Animalia
- Phylum: Arthropoda
- Clade: Pancrustacea
- Class: Insecta
- Order: Lepidoptera
- Superfamily: Noctuoidea
- Family: Erebidae
- Genus: Tamba
- Species: T. euryodia

Binomial name
- Tamba euryodia Prout, 1932

= Tamba euryodia =

Species of moth

Tamba euryodia is a noctuoid moth in the family Erebidae first described by Louis Beethoven Prout in 1932.

== Characteristics ==
The ground colour of the hindwing and much of the medial and dorsal area of the forewing are largely obscured by areas of mauve grey within which the orbicular of the forewing and the discal mark of the hindwing are conspicuous. The ground colour is restricted to the basal zone and an extensive apical rectangle on the forewing, these areas being finely fasciated in darker brown that also delineates the venation.

== Distribution and habitat ==
It is found in Peninsular Malaysia, Sumatra, Borneo, and Thailand, mainly in the hill dipterocarp forests.
