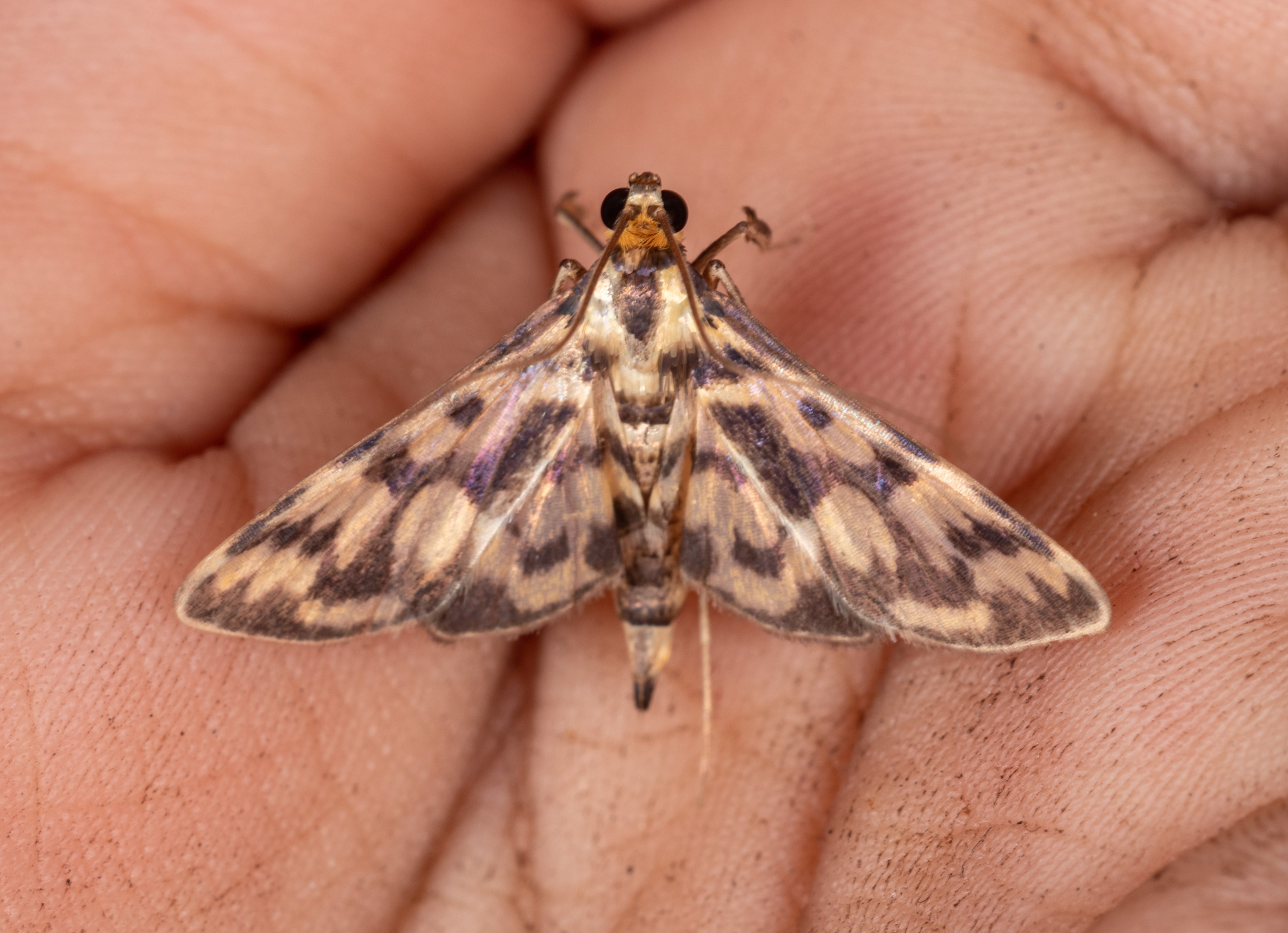
- Rhimphalea heranialis

Scientific classification
- Kingdom: Animalia
- Phylum: Arthropoda
- Class: Insecta
- Order: Lepidoptera
- Family: Crambidae
- Genus: Rhimphalea
- Species: R. heranialis

Binomial name
- Rhimphalea heranialis (Walker, 1859)

Synonyms
- Botys heranialis Walker, 1859; Rhimphalea papualis Felder & Rogenhofer, 1875; Polythlipta splendidalis Walker, [1866]

= Rhimphalea heranialis =

Species of moth

Rhimphalea heranialis is a moth in the family Crambidae. It was described by Francis Walker in 1859. It is found in New Guinea, Peninsular Malaya and Borneo.
