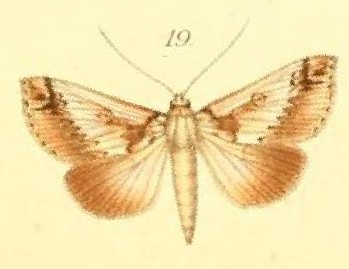

Scientific classification
- Kingdom: Animalia
- Phylum: Arthropoda
- Class: Insecta
- Order: Lepidoptera
- Superfamily: Noctuoidea
- Family: Nolidae
- Genus: Risoba
- Species: R. lunata

Binomial name
- Risoba lunata (Möschler, 1887)

Synonyms
- Lycoselene lunata Möschler, 1887

= Risoba lunata =

Species of moth

Risoba lunata is a species of moth of the family Nolidae. It is found in Ghana, Congo and Nigeria.

A known foodplant of its larvae is Combretum
