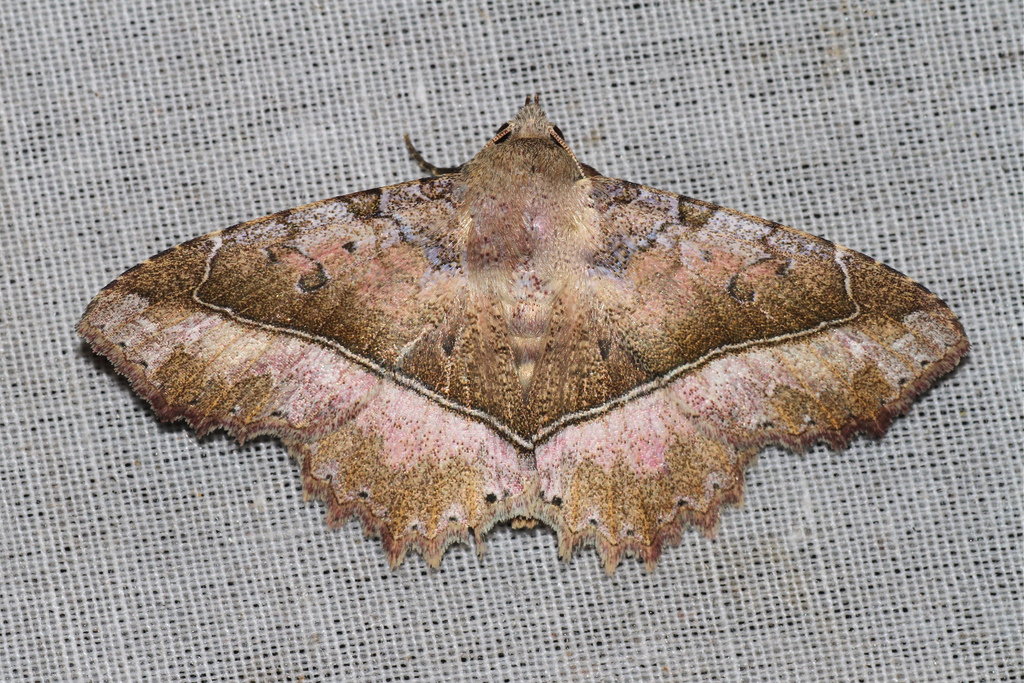
- Tamba dichroma, Borneo

Scientific classification
- Domain: Eukaryota
- Kingdom: Animalia
- Phylum: Arthropoda
- Class: Insecta
- Order: Lepidoptera
- Superfamily: Noctuoidea
- Family: Erebidae
- Subfamily: Boletobiinae
- Genus: Tamba; Walker, 1869

Type species
- Tamba submicacea Walker, 1869

Synonyms
- Obdora Walker, 1869

= Tamba (moth) =

Genus of moths

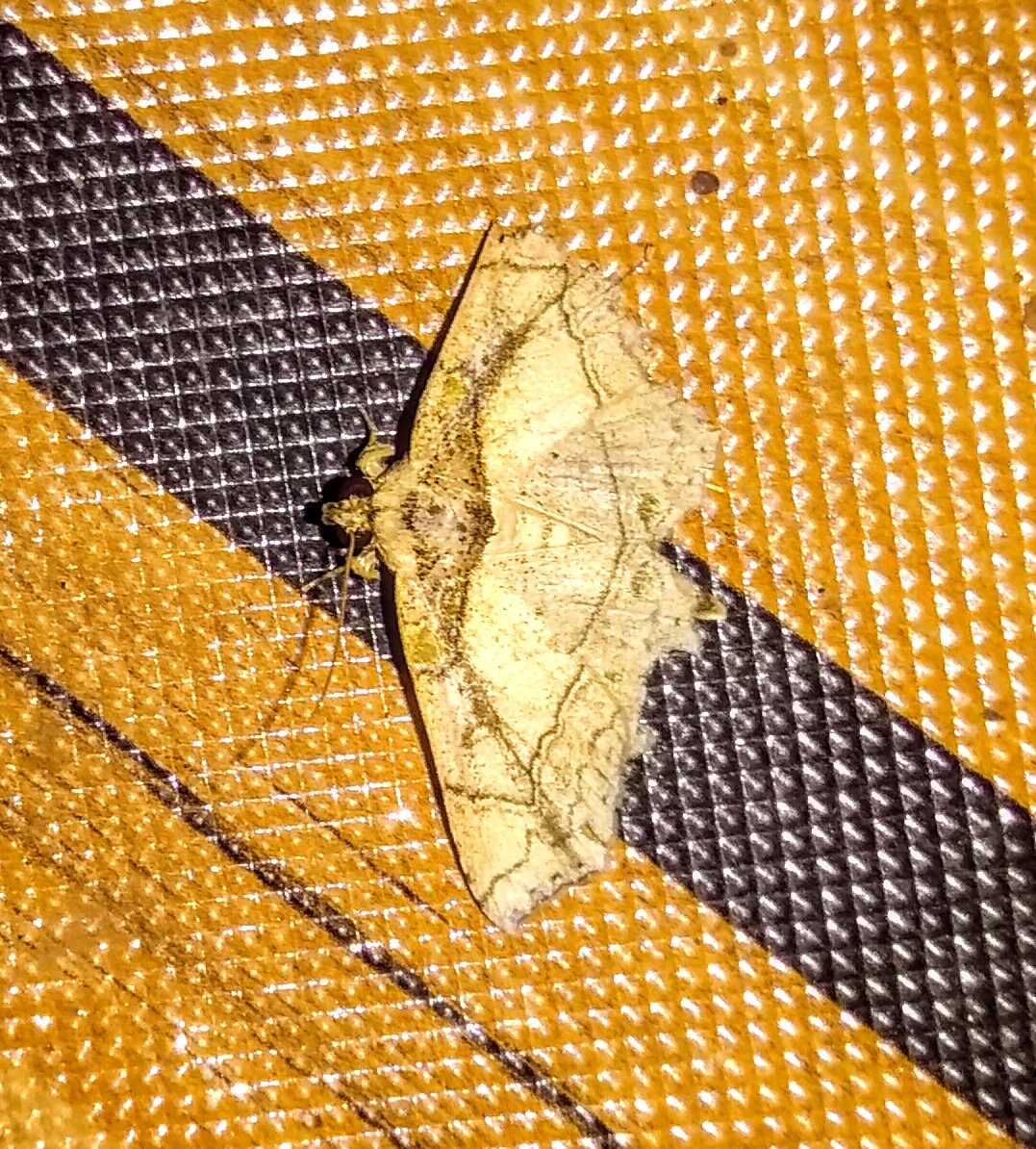
from Sri Lanka

Tamba is a genus of moths in the family Erebidae. It was erected by Francis Walker in 1869.

== Taxonomy ==
The genus has previously been classified in the Catocalinae or Calpinae subfamilies of the Erebidae or Noctuidae families.

== Characteristics ==
This is a large but morphologically uniform genus of rather delicate erebid moths with distinctively patterned wings, the hindwings usually having most elements of the forewing pattern. The ground color of the wings is usually pale fawn or grayish, and the forewing postmedial line is usually angled or curved round the discal area, though its more posterior oblique section may be continued by one of its components towards the apex. The male antennae are ciliate, and the legs are often tufted with scale crests and hair pencils. The labial palps are typical for catocalines.

== Species ==
- Tamba albidalis Walker, 1865
- Tamba andrica Prout, 1932
- Tamba angulata Candeze, 1927
- Tamba apicata Hampson, 1902
- Tamba ardescens Prout, 1926
- Tamba basiscripta Walker, 1864
- Tamba capatra Swinhoe, 1903
- Tamba carneotincta Hampson, 1926
- Tamba carnitincta Hampson, 1926
- Tamba chloroplaga Bethune-Baker, 1906
- Tamba cinnamomea Leech, 1900
- Tamba coeruleobasis Kobes, 1989
- Tamba conscripta Lucas, 1892
- Tamba corealis Leech, 1889
- Tamba cosmoloma Prout, 1928
- Tamba costinotata Butler, 1881
- Tamba cyrtogramma Turner, 1908
- Tamba decolor Walker, 1865
- Tamba delicata Prout, 1932
- Tamba diaphora Prout, 1932
- Tamba dichroma Prout, 1932
- Tamba dinawa Bethune-Baker, 1906
- Tamba elachista Hampson, 1926
- Tamba elegans Pagenstecher, 1884
- Tamba euryodia Prout, 1932
- Tamba flaviolata Hampson, 1926
- Tamba fulvivenis Bethune-Baker, 1910
- Tamba gensanalis Leech, 1889
- Tamba grandis Turner, 1933
- Tamba griseipars Hampson, 1926
- Tamba haemacta Turner, 1908
- Tamba hemiionia Hampson, 1926
- Tamba hieroglyphica Hampson, 1926
- Tamba ionomera Hampson, 1926
- Tamba kebea Bethune-Baker, 1906
- Tamba lahera Swinhoe, 1897
- Tamba lala Swinhoe, 1900
- Tamba lineifera Walker, 1865
- Tamba lorio Swinhoe, 1903
- Tamba magniplaga Swinhoe, 1902
- Tamba malayana Prout, 1932
- Tamba meeki Bethune-Baker, 1906
- Tamba megaspila Warren, 1903
- Tamba mindoro Felder, 1874
- Tamba mnionomera Hampson, 1926
- Tamba multiplaga Swinhoe, 1901
- Tamba nigrilinea Walker, 1869
- Tamba nigrilineata Wileman, 1915
- Tamba ochra Prout, 1932
- Tamba ochracea Prout, 1932
- Tamba ochreistriga Bethune-Baker, 1906
- Tamba ochrodes Swinhoe, 1899
- Tamba olivacea Pagenstecher, 1884
- Tamba pallida Prout, 1925
- Tamba palliolata Swinhoe, 1890
- Tamba parallela Wileman, 1915
- Tamba plumipes Hampson, 1926
- Tamba pronoa Turner
- Tamba prunescens Hampson, 1926
- Tamba punctistigma Hampson, 1895
- Tamba reduplicalis Walker, 1865
- Tamba rufipennis Hampson, 1895
- Tamba scopulina Hampson, 1926
- Tamba sidonalis Swinhoe, 1917
- Tamba sobana Kobes, 1983
- Tamba sondaicus Snellen, 1877
- Tamba splendida Prout, 1926
- Tamba submicacea Walker, 1869
- Tamba syndesma Lower, 1903
- Tamba tephraea Turner, 1909
- Tamba tessellata Bethune-Baker, 1906
- Tamba thermeola Hampson, 1926
- Tamba usurpatalis Walker, 1858
- Tamba vandenberghi Prout, 1932
- Tamba vinolia Hampson, 1895
