= Risoba avola =

Scientific classification
- Domain: Eukaryota
- Kingdom: Animalia
- Phylum: Arthropoda
- Class: Insecta
- Order: Lepidoptera
- Superfamily: Noctuoidea
- Family: Nolidae
- Genus: Risoba
- Species: R. avola

Binomial name
- Risoba avola Bethune-Baker, 1906

Synonyms
- Risoba ochracea A. E. Prout, 1922

Species of moth

Risoba avola is a species of moth of the family Nolidae first described by George Thomas Bethune-Baker in 1906.

== Distribution ==
It is found in Borneo, Sumatra, the Philippines and New Guinea.

== Subspecies ==
- Risoba avola avola Bethune-Baker, 1906
- Risoba avola magna A. E. Prout, 1922
