= Rhimphalea circotoma =

Scientific classification
- Kingdom: Animalia
- Phylum: Arthropoda
- Class: Insecta
- Order: Lepidoptera
- Family: Crambidae
- Genus: Rhimphalea
- Species: R. circotoma

Binomial name
- Rhimphalea circotoma Meyrick, 1889

Species of moth

Rhimphalea circotoma is a moth in the family Crambidae. It was described by Edward Meyrick in 1889. It is found on New Guinea.
