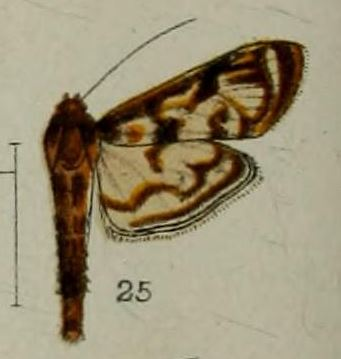

Scientific classification
- Kingdom: Animalia
- Phylum: Arthropoda
- Class: Insecta
- Order: Lepidoptera
- Family: Crambidae
- Genus: Rhimphalea
- Species: R. astrigalis

Binomial name
- Rhimphalea astrigalis Hampson, 1898

= Rhimphalea astrigalis =

Species of moth

Rhimphalea astrigalis is a small moth in the family Crambidae that is found in the mountains of Borneo and Thailand. The species was first described by George Hampson in 1898.
