= Rhodoneura discopis =

Scientific classification
- Kingdom: Animalia
- Phylum: Arthropoda
- Class: Insecta
- Order: Lepidoptera
- Family: Thyrididae
- Genus: Rhodoneura
- Species: R. discopis

Binomial name
- Rhodoneura discopis Hampson, 1910

Species of moth

Rhodoneura discopis is a moth of the family Thyrididae first described by George Hampson in 1910. It is found in Sri Lanka.
