= Rhimphalea perlescens =

Scientific classification
- Kingdom: Animalia
- Phylum: Arthropoda
- Class: Insecta
- Order: Lepidoptera
- Family: Crambidae
- Genus: Rhimphalea
- Species: R. perlescens

Binomial name
- Rhimphalea perlescens Whalley, 1962

Species of moth

Rhimphalea perlescens is a moth in the family Crambidae. It was described by Whalley in 1962. It is found on the Solomon Islands, where it has been recorded from Rennell Island.
