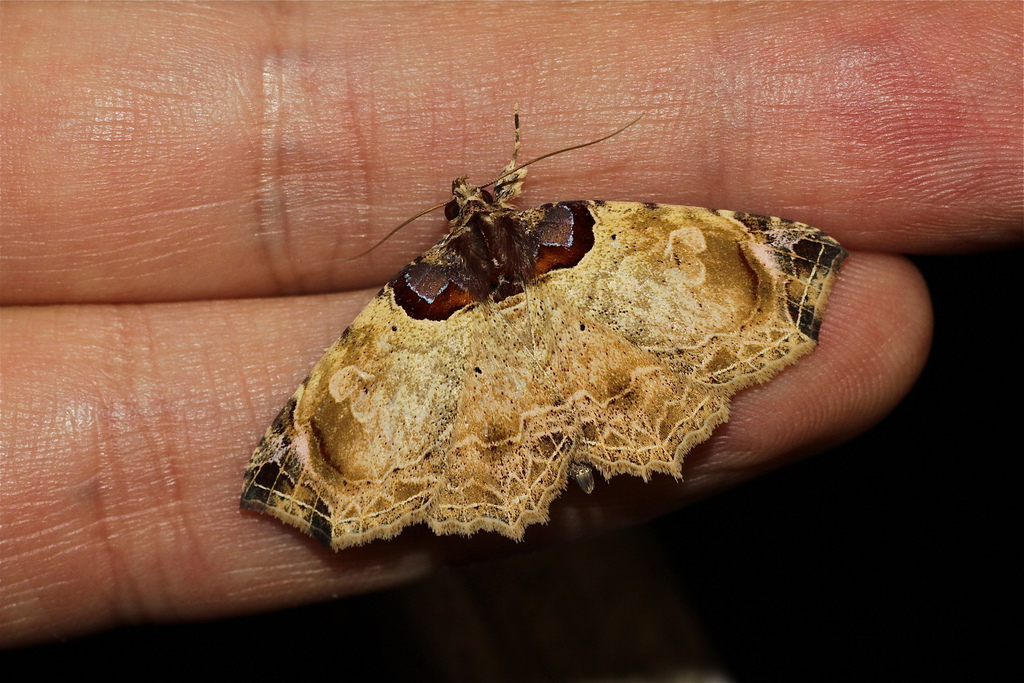
- Bornean specimen from hill mixed dipterocarp forest

Scientific classification
- Domain: Eukaryota
- Kingdom: Animalia
- Phylum: Arthropoda
- Class: Insecta
- Order: Lepidoptera
- Superfamily: Noctuoidea
- Family: Erebidae
- Genus: Tamba
- Species: T. coeruleobasis

Binomial name
- Tamba coeruleobasis Kobes, 1989

= Tamba coeruleobasis =

Species of moth

Tamba coeruleobasis is a noctuoid moth in the family Erebidae first described by Lutz W. R. Kobes in 1989.

== Characteristics ==
The medial area of the forewing is broadly unmarked from the irregularly black-bordered blue basal patch to the fine, irregular to zigzag paler fasciae in the marginal zone; these cross a triangular darker area at the apex.

== Distribution and habitat ==
It is found in Borneo, Sumatra, Peninsular Malaysia in the lowlands and hill forests.
