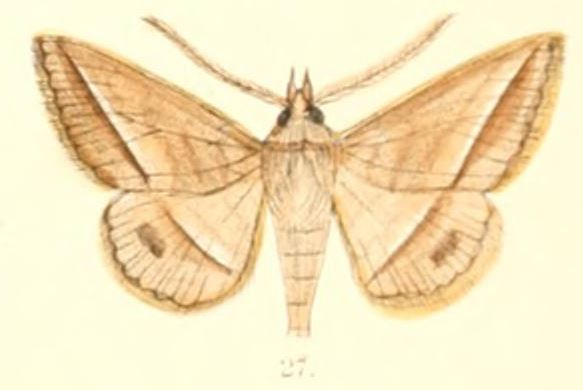

Scientific classification
- Kingdom: Animalia
- Phylum: Arthropoda
- Class: Insecta
- Order: Lepidoptera
- Superfamily: Noctuoidea
- Family: Erebidae
- Genus: Tochara
- Species: T. creberrima

Binomial name
- Tochara creberrima (Walker, 1858)

Synonyms
- Thermesia creberrima Walker, 1858; Iluza pyralina Moore, 1877; Tochara obliqua Moore, 1882; Tochara gilloloensis Swinhoe, 1919; Tochara salea Swinhoe, 1919

= Tochara creberrima =

Species of moth

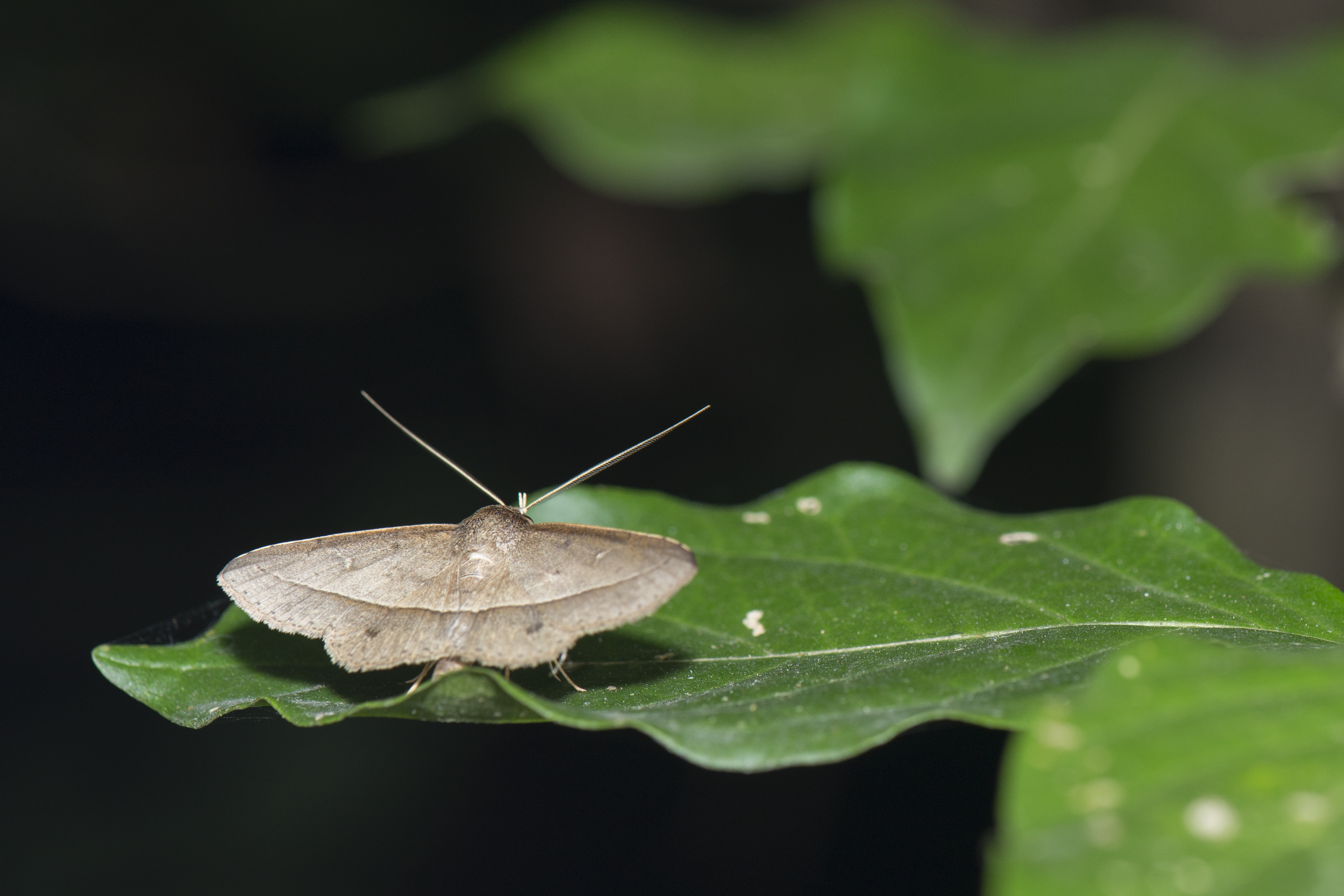

Tochara creberrima is a species of moth of the family Erebidae first described by Francis Walker in 1858.

== Distribution ==
It is found from India to Japan, New Guinea, the Carolines and Australia.

This species is more frequent in the lowlands.
