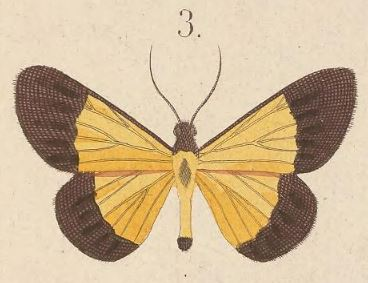
- Craspedosis melanura

Scientific classification
- Kingdom: Animalia
- Phylum: Arthropoda
- Clade: Pancrustacea
- Class: Insecta
- Order: Lepidoptera
- Family: Geometridae
- Tribe: Boarmiini
- Genus: Craspedosis; Butler, [1877]

= Craspedosis =

Genus of moths

Craspedosis is a genus of moths in the family Geometridae.

== Species ==
- Craspedosis arycandata (Walker, 1862)
- Craspedosis atramentaria (Warren, 1894)
- Craspedosis cyanoxantha (Meyrick, 1889)
- Craspedosis leucosticta Warren, 1896
- Craspedosis melanura (Kirsch, 1877)
- Craspedosis simulans Butler
- Craspedosis sobria (Walker, [1865])
- Craspedosis timor (Walker, [1865])
- Craspedosis tricolor Felder
- Craspedosis undulosa Warren, 1894
