= Tamba decolor =

Scientific classification
- Kingdom: Animalia
- Phylum: Arthropoda
- Class: Insecta
- Order: Lepidoptera
- Superfamily: Noctuoidea
- Family: Erebidae
- Genus: Tamba
- Species: T. decolor

Binomial name
- Tamba decolor Walker, 1865

Species of insect

Tamba decolor is a moth of the family Erebidae.
