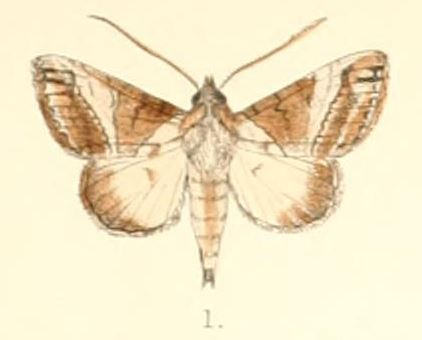

Scientific classification
- Domain: Eukaryota
- Kingdom: Animalia
- Phylum: Arthropoda
- Class: Insecta
- Order: Lepidoptera
- Superfamily: Noctuoidea
- Family: Nolidae
- Genus: Risoba
- Species: R. vialis

Binomial name
- Risoba vialis Moore, 1881

= Risoba vialis =

Species of moth

Risoba vialis is a species of moth of the family Nolidae. It is found in India, Philippines, Sulawesi and Sundaland.
