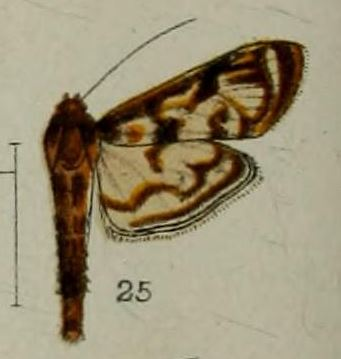
- Rhimphalea astrigalis

Scientific classification
- Kingdom: Animalia
- Phylum: Arthropoda
- Clade: Pancrustacea
- Class: Insecta
- Order: Lepidoptera
- Family: Crambidae
- Tribe: Margaroniini
- Genus: Rhimphalea; Lederer, 1863

= Rhimphalea =

Genus of moths

Rhimphalea is a genus of small moths, which is part of the family Crambidae.

== Species ==
- Rhimphalea anoxantha Hampson, 1912
- Rhimphalea astrigalis Hampson, 1899 (Borneo, Thailand)
- Rhimphalea circotoma Meyrick, 1889
- Rhimphalea heranialis (Walker, 1859)
- Rhimphalea lindusalis (Walker, 1859) (Australia)
- Rhimphalea linealis Kenrick, 1907 (New Guinea)
- Rhimphalea ochalis (Walker, 1859)
- Rhimphalea perlescens Whalley, 1962
- Rhimphalea sceletalis Lederer, 1863 (Australia, New Guinea)
- Rhimphalea trogusalis (Walker, 1859)

== Former species ==
- Rhimphalea ocularis (C. Felder, R. Felder & Rogenhofer, 1875)
- Rhimphalea papualis C. Felder, R. Felder & Rogenhofer, 1875
