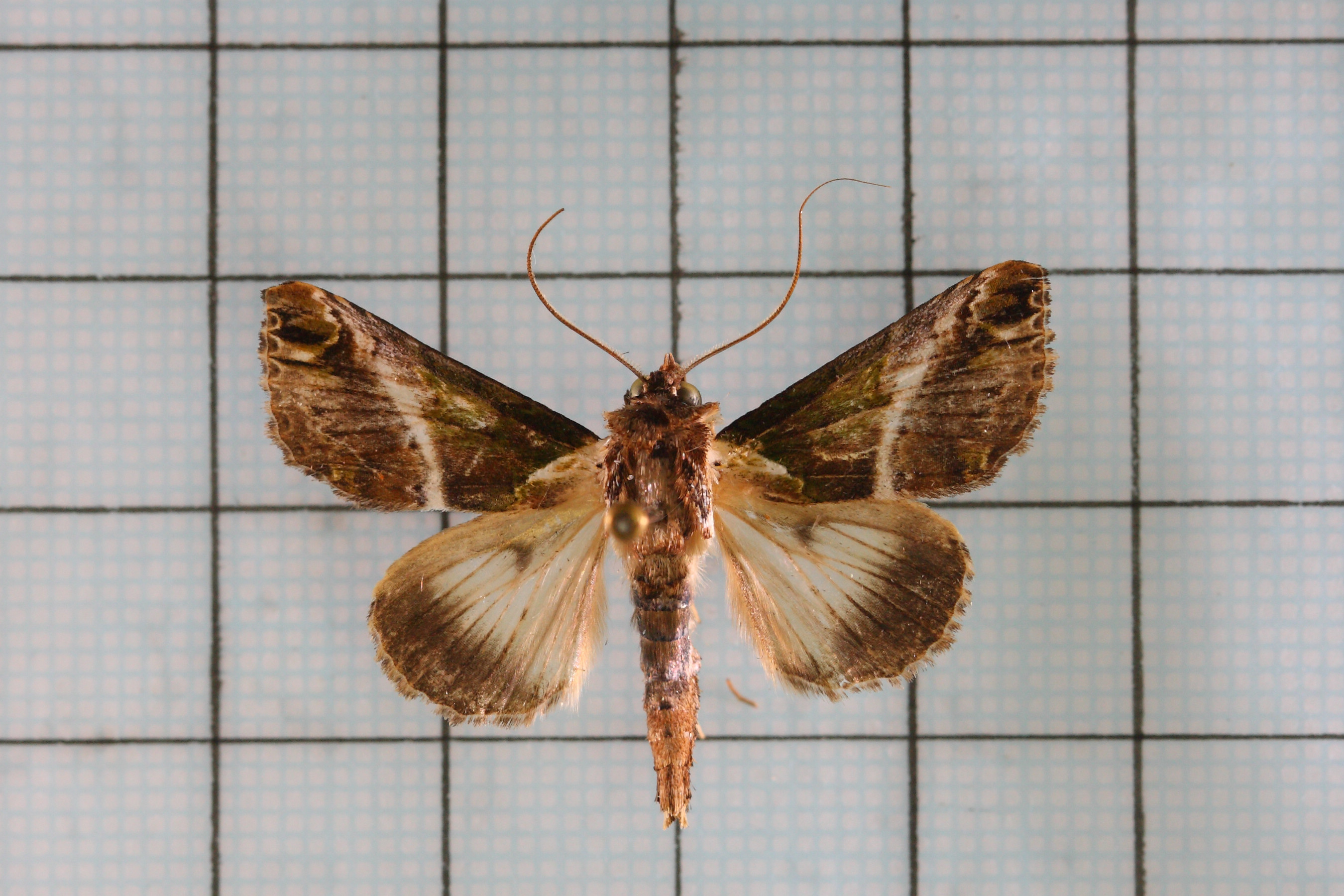
- Risoba prominens

Scientific classification
- Domain: Eukaryota
- Kingdom: Animalia
- Phylum: Arthropoda
- Class: Insecta
- Order: Lepidoptera
- Superfamily: Noctuoidea
- Family: Nolidae
- Subfamily: Risobinae
- Genus: Risoba; Moore, 1881

Synonyms
- Pitrasa Moore, 1882; Lycoselene Möschler, 1887

= Risoba =

Genus of moths

Risoba is a genus of moths of the family Nolidae erected by Frederic Moore in 1881.

== Description ==
Its palpi are upturned and reach the vertex of the head. Antennae almost as long as forewing, with fasciculated (bundled) cilia in male. Thorax and abdomen smoothly scaled, latter long. Tibia smooth and spineless. Forewings without raised tufts and rectangular apex. Cilia non-crenulate. Retinaculum of male bar shaped and claspers long and elongate.

== Species ==
- Risoba avola Bethune-Baker, 1906
- Risoba basalis Moore, 1882
- Risoba becki Kobes, 2006 (Sumatra)
- Risoba caeruleata Holloway, 2003
- Risoba calaina Zerny, 1916
- Risoba calainigrata Holloway, 2003
- Risoba calainodes A. E. Prout, 1928
- Risoba chlora Hampson, 1912
- Risoba delicata Bethune-Baker, 1906
- Risoba diehli Kobes, 1982
- Risoba diphteroides Hampson, 1898
- Risoba diphtheropsis A. E. Prout, 1924
- Risoba diplogramma Hampson, 1912
- Risoba diversipennis (Walker, 1858)
- Risoba flavipennis Hampson, 1895
- Risoba glauca Hampson, 1912
- Risoba guichardi Holloway, 2003
- Risoba harmani Holloway, 2003 (Borneo, Brunei, Indonesia)
- Risoba helbaueri Kobes, 2006 (Sumatra)
- Risoba hiemischi Kobes, 2006 (Sumatra)
- Risoba hollowayi Kobes, 2006 (Sumatra)
- Risoba jucunda (Walker, 1862)
- Risoba kebea Bethune-Baker, 1906
- Risoba lunata (Möschler, 1887) (Ghana, Congo, Nigeria)
- Risoba malagasy (Viette, 1965) (Madagascar)
- Risoba martinii Holloway, 2003
- Risoba menhoferi Kobes, 2006 (Sumatra)
- Risoba obscurivialis Holloway, 2003
- Risoba obstructa Moore, 1881
- Risoba olivens Bethune-Baker, 1906
- Risoba orientalis Holloway, 1976
- Risoba ornata Wileman & West, 1929
- Risoba owgarra A. E. Prout, 1921
- Risoba pratti Bethune-Baker, 1906
- Risoba prominens Moore, 1881 (Nepal to Japan/New Guinea)
- Risoba rafflesae Kobes, 2006 (Sumatra)
- Risoba rectilinea Draudt, 1950 (China)
- Risoba repugnans (Walker, 1856)
- Risoba rothei Kobes, 2006 (Sumatra)
- Risoba samarinda Holloway, 2003
- Risoba sticticata A. E. Prout, 1924 (New Guinea)
- Risoba sticticraspis Hampson, 1912
- Risoba tenuipoda (Strand, 1920)
- Risoba thalasscura Holloway, 2003
- Risoba trivialis Kobes, 2006 (Sumatra)
- Risoba variegata (Moore, 1882) (India)
- Risoba variegatoides Poole, 1989
- Risoba vialis Moore, 1881 (India to Borneo)
- Risoba viridangulata Holloway, 2003
- Risoba viridata Bethune-Baker, 1906
- Risoba viridescens Hampson, 1914
- Risoba vitellina (Moore, 1882) (India)
- Risoba walshae Holloway, 2003
- Risoba wittstadti Kobes, 2006 (Sumatra)
