= Rhodoneura nitens =

Scientific classification
- Domain: Eukaryota
- Kingdom: Animalia
- Phylum: Arthropoda
- Class: Insecta
- Order: Lepidoptera
- Family: Thyrididae
- Genus: Rhodoneura
- Species: R. nitens

Binomial name
- Rhodoneura nitens (Butler, 1887)

Species of moth

Rhodoneura nitens is a moth of the family Thyrididae first described by Arthur Gardiner Butler in 1887. It is found in Sri Lanka.
