= Rhodoneura disparalis =

Scientific classification
- Kingdom: Animalia
- Phylum: Arthropoda
- Class: Insecta
- Order: Lepidoptera
- Family: Thyrididae
- Genus: Rhodoneura
- Species: R. disparalis

Binomial name
- Rhodoneura disparalis Hampson, 1893

Species of moth

Rhodoneura disparalis is a moth of the family Thyrididae first described by George Hampson in 1893. It is found in Sri Lanka.
