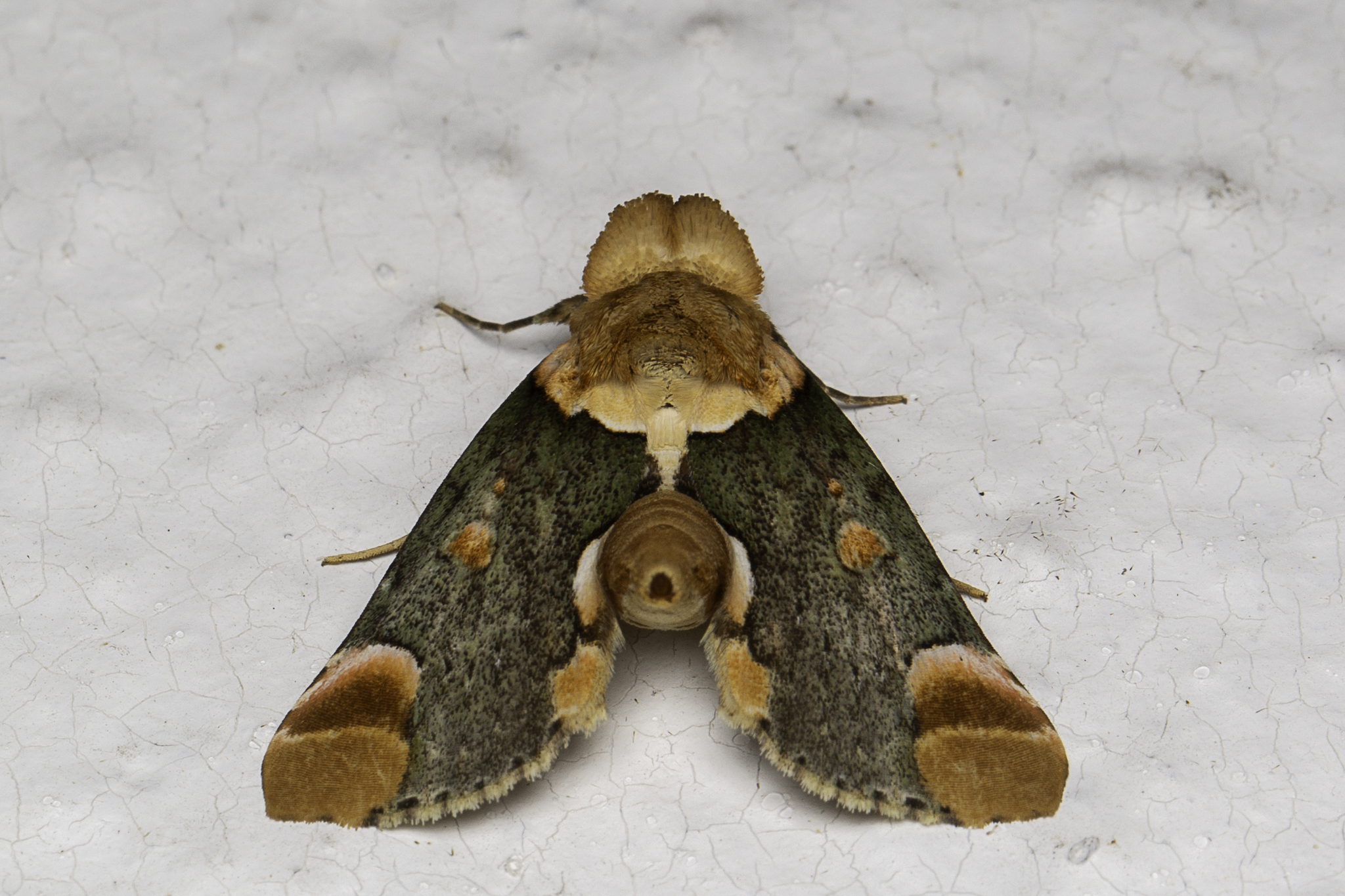
- Risoba repugnans
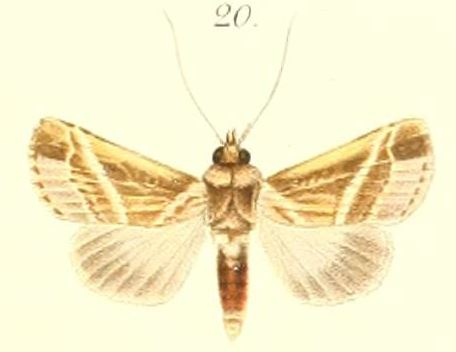
- Risoba repugnans ssp. albistriata

Scientific classification
- Kingdom: Animalia
- Phylum: Arthropoda
- Clade: Pancrustacea
- Class: Insecta
- Order: Lepidoptera
- Superfamily: Noctuoidea
- Family: Nolidae
- Genus: Risoba
- Species: R. repugnans

Binomial name
- Risoba repugnans (Walker, 1865)

Synonyms
- Thyatira repugnans; Risoba literata Moore, 1881; Heliothis albistriata Pagenstecher, 1888

= Risoba repugnans =

Species of moth

Risoba repugnans is a species of moth of the family Nolidae first described by Francis Walker in 1865.

== Distribution ==
It is found from India and Sri Lanka to the Solomon Islands.

== Description ==
It has a wingspan of 40 mm. Head brown. Thorax and abdomen brownish white. Forewings brownish grey with a basal white patch slightly suffused with bright rufous. There are indistinct waved antemedial, postmedial, and sub-marginal lines. The orbicular is a speck, whereas reniform white with rufous center and edge. A large apical rufous patch with whitish lunule found on its inner side. Some rufous patches with white edges found on outer part of inner margin. A marginal series of dark specks present. Hindwings white with the fuscous outer are and ventrally with cell spot.

== Subspecies ==
- Risoba repugnans repugnans (Walker, 1865)
- Risoba repugnans albistriata (Pagenstecher, 1888) (Bismarck Archipelago)

== Biology ==
The larvae had been recorded on Melastoma sp.
