= Risoba hollowayi =

Scientific classification
- Domain: Eukaryota
- Kingdom: Animalia
- Phylum: Arthropoda
- Class: Insecta
- Order: Lepidoptera
- Superfamily: Noctuoidea
- Family: Nolidae
- Genus: Risoba
- Species: R. hollowayi

Binomial name
- Risoba hollowayi Kobes, 2006

Species of moth

Risoba hollowayi is a species of moth of the family Nolidae. It is found in Sumatra.
