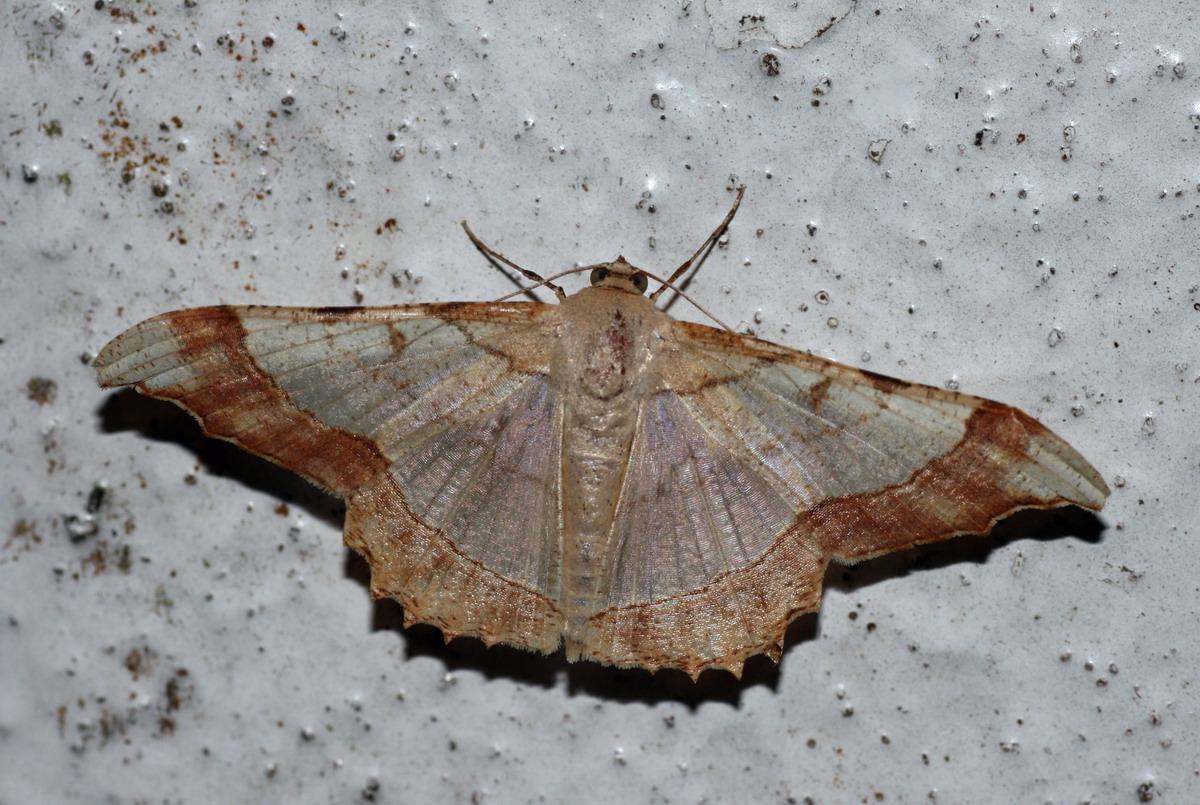

Scientific classification
- Kingdom: Animalia
- Phylum: Arthropoda
- Clade: Pancrustacea
- Class: Insecta
- Order: Lepidoptera
- Family: Geometridae
- Genus: Zeheba
- Species: Z. aureatoides

Binomial name
- Zeheba aureatoides Holloway, 1993

= Zeheba aureatoides =

Species of moth

Zeheba aureatoides is a moth of the family Geometridae first described by Jeremy Daniel Holloway in 1993. It is found in Borneo, Peninsular Malaysia and Sulawesi.

The wingspan is about 19 mm. The species resembles Zeheba aureata or Zeheba marginata, but is larger, less yellow in tinge and with somewhat broader borders to the wings.
