= Tochara olivacea =

Scientific classification
- Kingdom: Animalia
- Phylum: Arthropoda
- Clade: Pancrustacea
- Class: Insecta
- Order: Lepidoptera
- Superfamily: Noctuoidea
- Family: Erebidae
- Genus: Tochara
- Species: T. olivacea

Binomial name
- Tochara olivacea Holloway, 1976

Species of moth

Tochara is a species of moth of the family Erebidae first described by Jeremy Daniel Holloway in 1976. It is found in Borneo.

The male has a wingspan of about 18 mm and the female of 20 mm.
