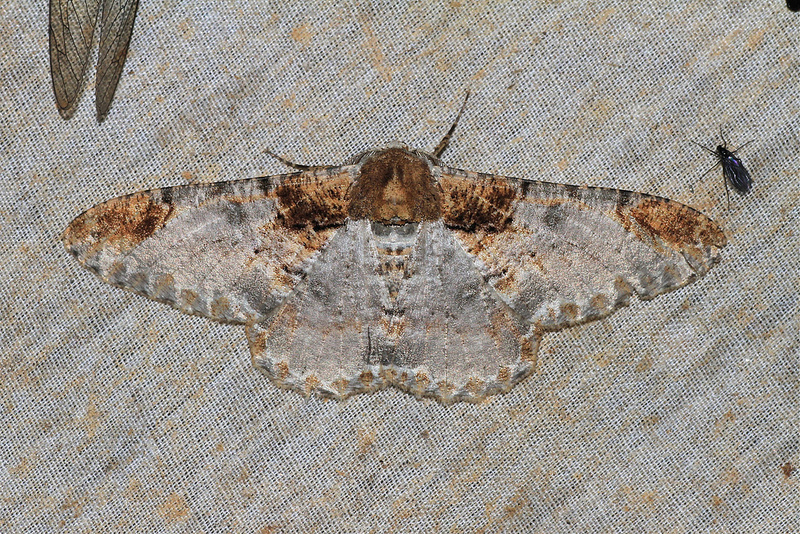
- Bornean male from the hill mixed dipterocarp forest

Scientific classification
- Kingdom: Animalia
- Phylum: Arthropoda
- Class: Insecta
- Order: Lepidoptera
- Family: Geometridae
- Subfamily: Ennominae
- Tribe: Boarmiini
- Genus: Amraica
- Species: A. solivagaria

Binomial name
- Amraica solivagaria (Walker, 1866)

Synonyms
- Boarmia solivagaria (Walker, 1866)

= Amraica solivagaria =

Species of moth

Amraica solivagaria is a species of geometer moths in the Ennominae subfamily.

== Characteristics ==
The males have characteristic brownish-red patches at the base and apex of the forewing, contrasting with a pale gray ground, while the females are more uniform pale brown, with the apical and basal forewing patches less distinct and the post- and antemedial fasciae more clearly delineated with black.

== Distribution and habitat ==
It is found in Borneo and Sulawesi in the lowlands and hill forests.
