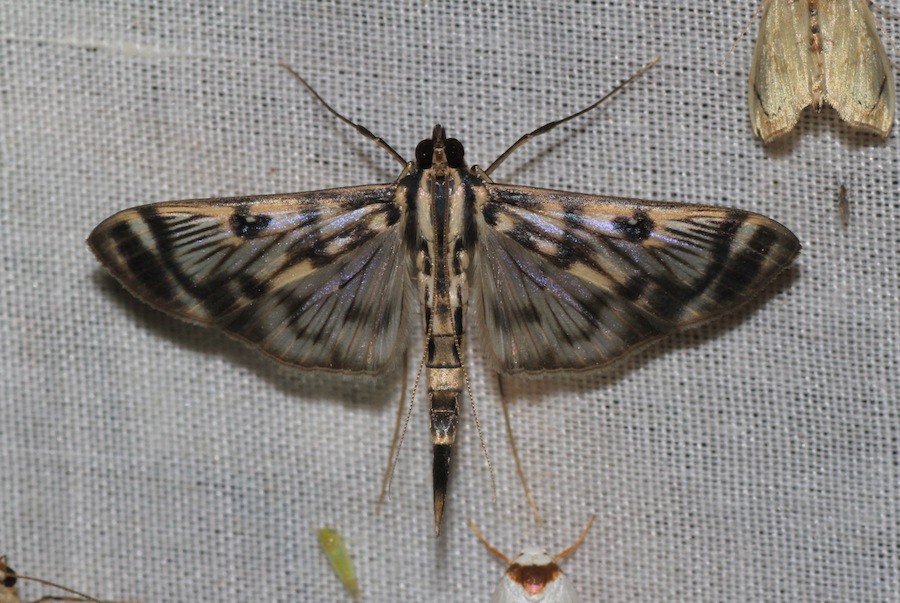

Scientific classification
- Kingdom: Animalia
- Phylum: Arthropoda
- Class: Insecta
- Order: Lepidoptera
- Family: Crambidae
- Genus: Rhimphalea
- Species: R. ochalis

Binomial name
- Rhimphalea ochalis (Walker, 1859)

Synonyms
- Botys ochalis Walker, 1859

= Rhimphalea ochalis =

Species of moth

Rhimphalea ochalis is a moth in the family Crambidae. It was described by Francis Walker in 1859. It is found in India, West Malaysia, Borneo, Sumatra, and Indonesia (Java). in lowlands to montane forests (1000 m).
