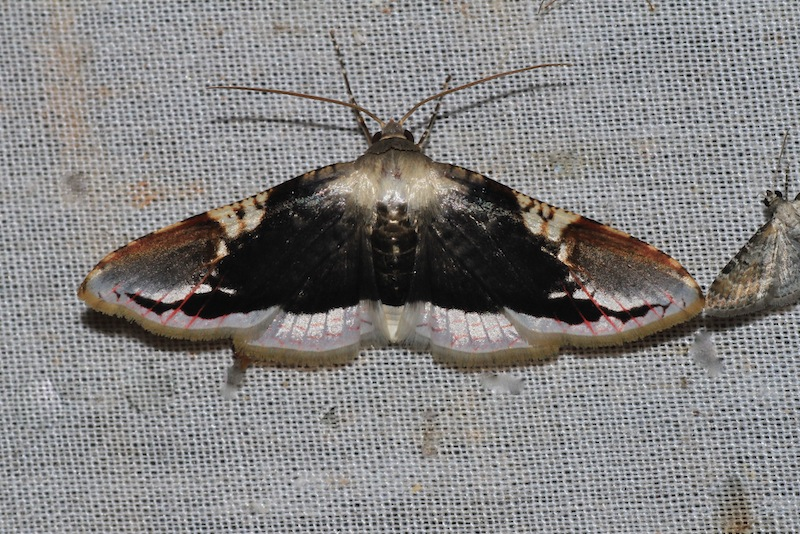

Scientific classification
- Kingdom: Animalia
- Phylum: Arthropoda
- Class: Insecta
- Order: Lepidoptera
- Family: Thyrididae
- Genus: Rhodoneura
- Species: R. acaciusalis

Binomial name
- Rhodoneura acaciusalis (Walker, 1859)

Synonyms
- Pyralis acaciusalis Walker, 1859; Siculodes rosacea Pagenstecher, 1892

= Rhodoneura acaciusalis =

Species of moth

Rhodoneura acaciusalis is a species of moth of the family Thyrididae. It is found in Hindustan, Karnataka, West Sumatra, West Malaysia, Borneo (Sabah, Sarawak), and Brunei in lowlands and lower montane forests at altitudes below 1500 m.

The wingspan is 35 mm. This species is superbly and distinctively patterned in pastel shades of pink and purplish brown with little indication of the typical thyridid reticulation (net-like) pattern. On the underside the forewing is predominantly greyish cream with brown suffusion and with veins R5 to CuA2 covered by bright pink or red scales.
