= Risoba wittstadti =

Scientific classification
- Domain: Eukaryota
- Kingdom: Animalia
- Phylum: Arthropoda
- Class: Insecta
- Order: Lepidoptera
- Superfamily: Noctuoidea
- Family: Nolidae
- Genus: Risoba
- Species: R. wittstadti

Binomial name
- Risoba wittstadti Kobes, 2006

Species of moth

Risoba wittstadti is a species of moth of the family Nolidae. It is found in Sumatra.
