= Risoba calainodes =

Scientific classification
- Kingdom: Animalia
- Phylum: Arthropoda
- Clade: Pancrustacea
- Class: Insecta
- Order: Lepidoptera
- Superfamily: Noctuoidea
- Family: Nolidae
- Genus: Risoba
- Species: R. calainodes

Binomial name
- Risoba calainodes A. E. Prout, 1928

Species of moth

Risoba calainodes is a species of moth of the family Nolidae first described by Alice Ellen Prout in 1928. It is found in Sumatra.
