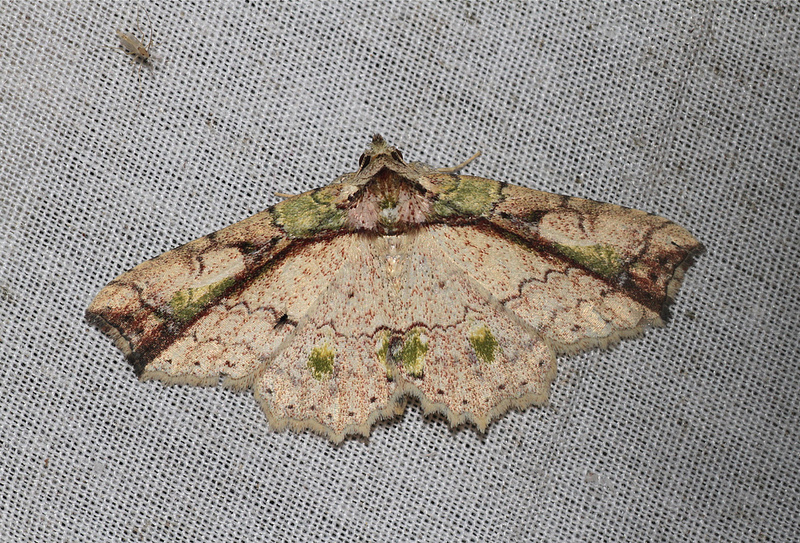

Scientific classification
- Kingdom: Animalia
- Phylum: Arthropoda
- Class: Insecta
- Order: Lepidoptera
- Superfamily: Noctuoidea
- Family: Erebidae
- Genus: Tamba
- Species: T. mnionomera

Binomial name
- Tamba mnionomera Hampson, 1926

= Tamba mnionomera =

Species of moth

Tamba mnionomera is a noctuoid moth of the family Erebidae first described by George Hampson in 1926.

== Characteristics ==
This is one of the similar species, with a longitudinal dark streak on the forewing that meets the margin at its angle. T. mnionomera has a weaker streak, more lunulate fasciation, and greenish markings, particularly a spot in the center of the hindwing just distal to the postmedial.

== Distribution and habitat ==
It is found in Thailand and Sundaland. The species is frequent in the lowlands, found in a range of forest types and in disturbed habitats.
