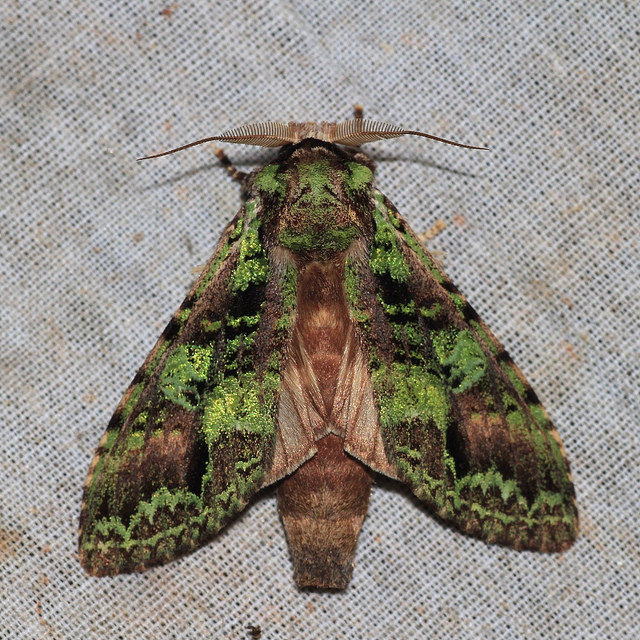
- Oxoia smaragdiplena from Borneo

Scientific classification
- Kingdom: Animalia
- Phylum: Arthropoda
- Clade: Pancrustacea
- Class: Insecta
- Order: Lepidoptera
- Superfamily: Noctuoidea
- Family: Notodontidae
- Genus: Oxoia; Kiriakoff, 1967

Type species
- Oxoia smaragdiplena Walker, 1862

Synonyms
- Panteleclita Kiriakoff, 1974

= Oxoia =

Genus of moths

Oxoia is a genus of moths in the family Notodontidae described by Sergius G. Kiriakoff in 1967. Three species are known.

== Characteristics ==
The genus is characterized by elongated green forewings. There are diagnostic black streaks in the postmedian and the basal area of the forewings. Both sexes are similar.

== Distribution and habitat ==
The genus ranges from the Himalayas, Indochina, Yunnan and Sundaland throughout the oriental islands until New Guinea

== Species ==
- Oxoia antonia Druce, 1901
- Oxoia irrorativiridis Bethune-Baker, 1904
- Oxoia smaragdiplena Walker 1862
