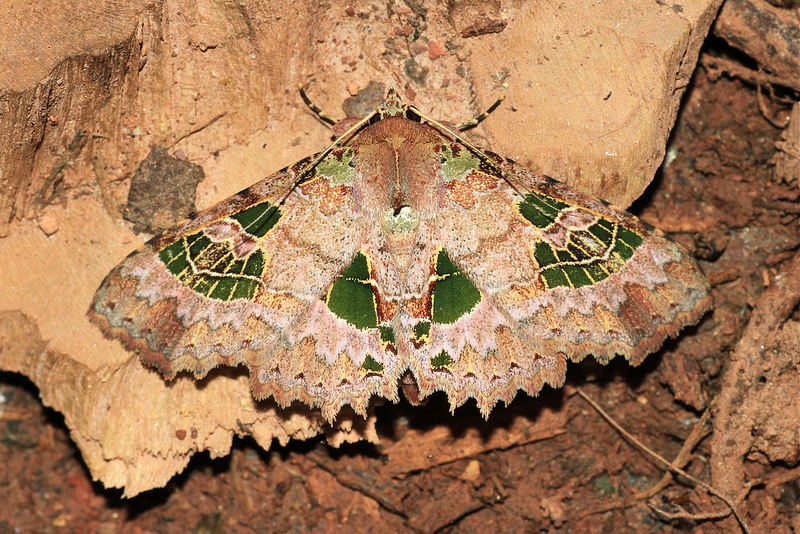
- Bornean specimen from hill mixed dipterocarp forest

Scientific classification
- Kingdom: Animalia
- Phylum: Arthropoda
- Clade: Pancrustacea
- Class: Insecta
- Order: Lepidoptera
- Superfamily: Noctuoidea
- Family: Erebidae
- Genus: Tamba
- Species: T. delicata

Binomial name
- Tamba delicata Prout, 1932

= Tamba delicata =

Species of moth

Tamba delicata is a noctuoid moth in the family Erebidae first described by Louis Beethoven Prout in 1932.

== Characteristics ==
The green patches on a variegated and fasciated grey ground distinguish this species from other congeners.

== Distribution and habitat ==
It is found in Borneo, Sumatra, Peninsular Malaysia, and Java in the lowlands and hill forests.
