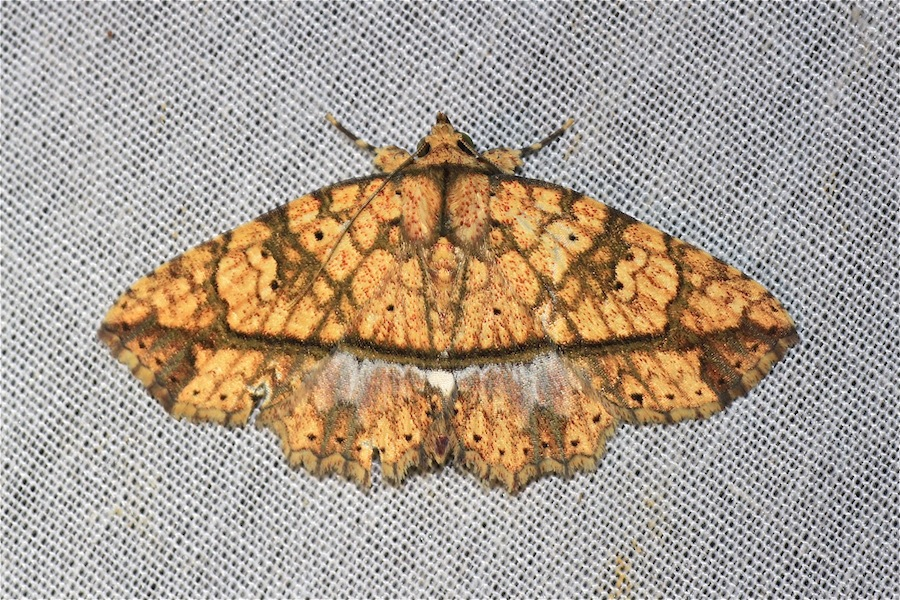
- Bornean species found in the Trusmadi lower montane dipterocarp forest

Scientific classification
- Kingdom: Animalia
- Phylum: Arthropoda
- Clade: Pancrustacea
- Class: Insecta
- Order: Lepidoptera
- Superfamily: Noctuoidea
- Family: Erebidae
- Genus: Tamba
- Species: T. ochra

Binomial name
- Tamba ochra Prout, 1932

= Tamba ochra =

Species of moth

Tamba ochra is a noctuoid moth in the family Erebidae first, described by Louis Beethoven Prout in 1932. It inhabits lowland forests of Thailand, Peninsular Malaysia and Borneo.
