= Risoba diphtheropsis =

Scientific classification
- Kingdom: Animalia
- Phylum: Arthropoda
- Clade: Pancrustacea
- Class: Insecta
- Order: Lepidoptera
- Superfamily: Noctuoidea
- Family: Nolidae
- Genus: Risoba
- Species: R. diphtheropsis

Binomial name
- Risoba diphtheropsis A. E. Prout, 1924

Species of moth

Risoba diphtheropsis is a species of moth of the family Nolidae first described by Alice Ellen Prout in 1924. It is found in New Guinea.
