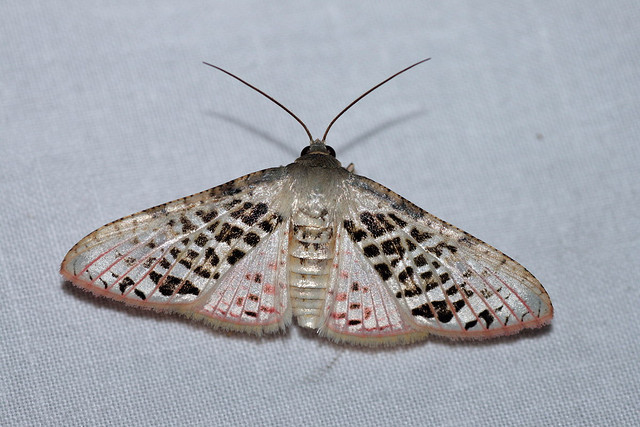

Scientific classification
- Kingdom: Animalia
- Phylum: Arthropoda
- Class: Insecta
- Order: Lepidoptera
- Family: Thyrididae
- Genus: Rhodoneura
- Species: R. pudicula

Binomial name
- Rhodoneura pudicula (Guenée, 1858)

Synonyms
- Siculodes pudicula Guenée, [1858]; Osca guttulosa Walker, 1863

= Rhodoneura pudicula =

Species of moth

Rhodoneura pudicula is a species of moth of the family Thyrididae. It is found in Thailand, West Sumatra, West Malaysia, Brunei, Borneo (Sabah), Kalimantan, Java, Bali, Sulawesi, West Papua and Papua New Guinea in lowlands and lower montane forests at altitudes below 1400 m. It is the type species of the genus Rhodoneura.
