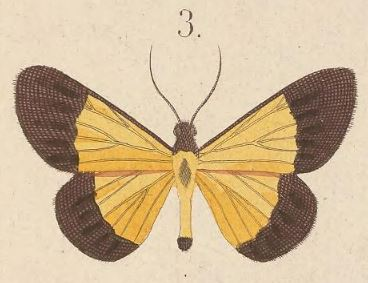

Scientific classification
- Domain: Eukaryota
- Kingdom: Animalia
- Phylum: Arthropoda
- Class: Insecta
- Order: Lepidoptera
- Family: Geometridae
- Genus: Craspedosis
- Species: C. melanura

Binomial name
- Craspedosis melanura (Kirsch, 1877)

Synonyms
- Eusemia melanura Kirsch, 1877; Xanthomima plumbeomargo Joicey & Talbot, 1916

= Craspedosis melanura =

Species of moth

Craspedosis melanura is a moth of the family Geometridae. It is found in New Guinea.
