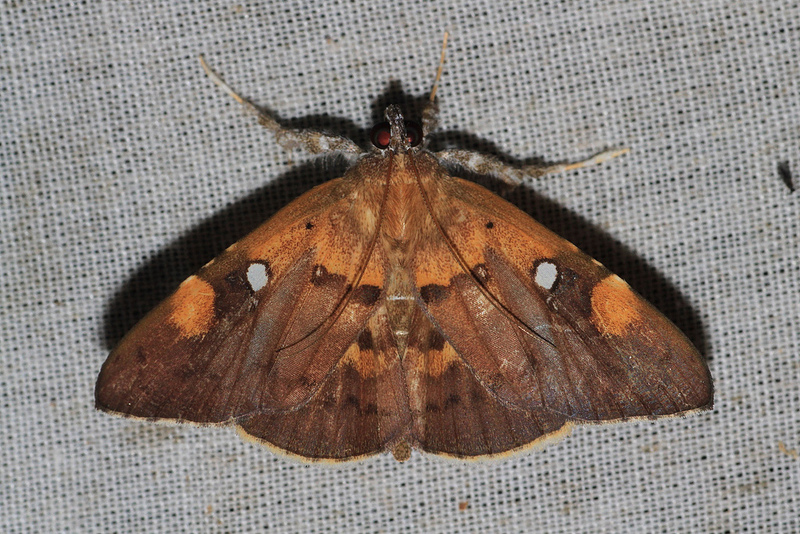
- Specimen from Sabah on Borneo

Scientific classification
- Kingdom: Animalia
- Phylum: Arthropoda
- Clade: Pancrustacea
- Class: Insecta
- Order: Lepidoptera
- Superfamily: Noctuoidea
- Family: Erebidae
- Subfamily: Erebinae
- Genus: Rectipalpula de Joannis, 1900
- Species: R. billeti

Binomial name
- Rectipalpula billeti de Joannis, 1900

Synonyms
- Oxyodes billeti (de Joannis, 1900)

= Rectipalpula =

Genus of moths

Rectipalpula is a monotypic moth genus of the family Erebidae and subfamily Erebinae. It was seen as a synonym for Oxyodes, but is now considered a separate genus. Its single species, Rectipalpula billeti, is found in northern India, Vietnam, Thailand, Sundaland and Sulawesi. It is frequent over an altitude range from sea level to about 2000 m, the species has been recorded from forested, disturbed and cultivated areas. Both the genus and the species were first described by Joseph de Joannis in 1900.
