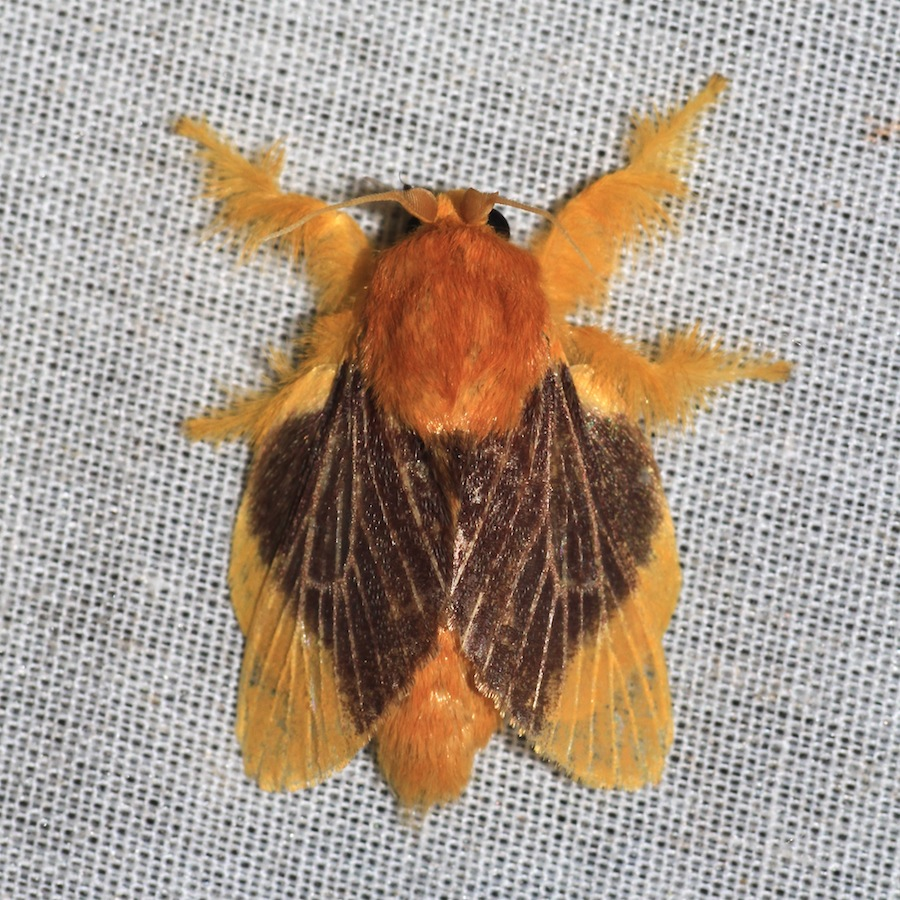

Scientific classification
- Kingdom: Animalia
- Phylum: Arthropoda
- Class: Insecta
- Order: Lepidoptera
- Family: Limacodidae
- Genus: Barisania
- Species: B. lampra

Binomial name
- Barisania lampra (West, 1937)

Synonyms
- Parasa lampra West, 1937

= Barisania lampra =

Species of moth

Barisania lampra is a species of moth of the family Limacodidae. It is found on Sumatra and Borneo.

The wingspan is 27–33 mm.
