= Pseudognaphalium lanatum =

Scientific classification
- Kingdom: Plantae
- Clade: Tracheophytes
- Clade: Angiosperms
- Clade: Eudicots
- Clade: Asterids
- Order: Asterales
- Family: Asteraceae
- Genus: Pseudognaphalium
- Species: P. lanatum

Binomial name
- Pseudognaphalium lanatum (G.Forst.) Smissen, Breitw. & de Lange

Species of plant

Pseudognaphalium lanatum is a species of plant.
