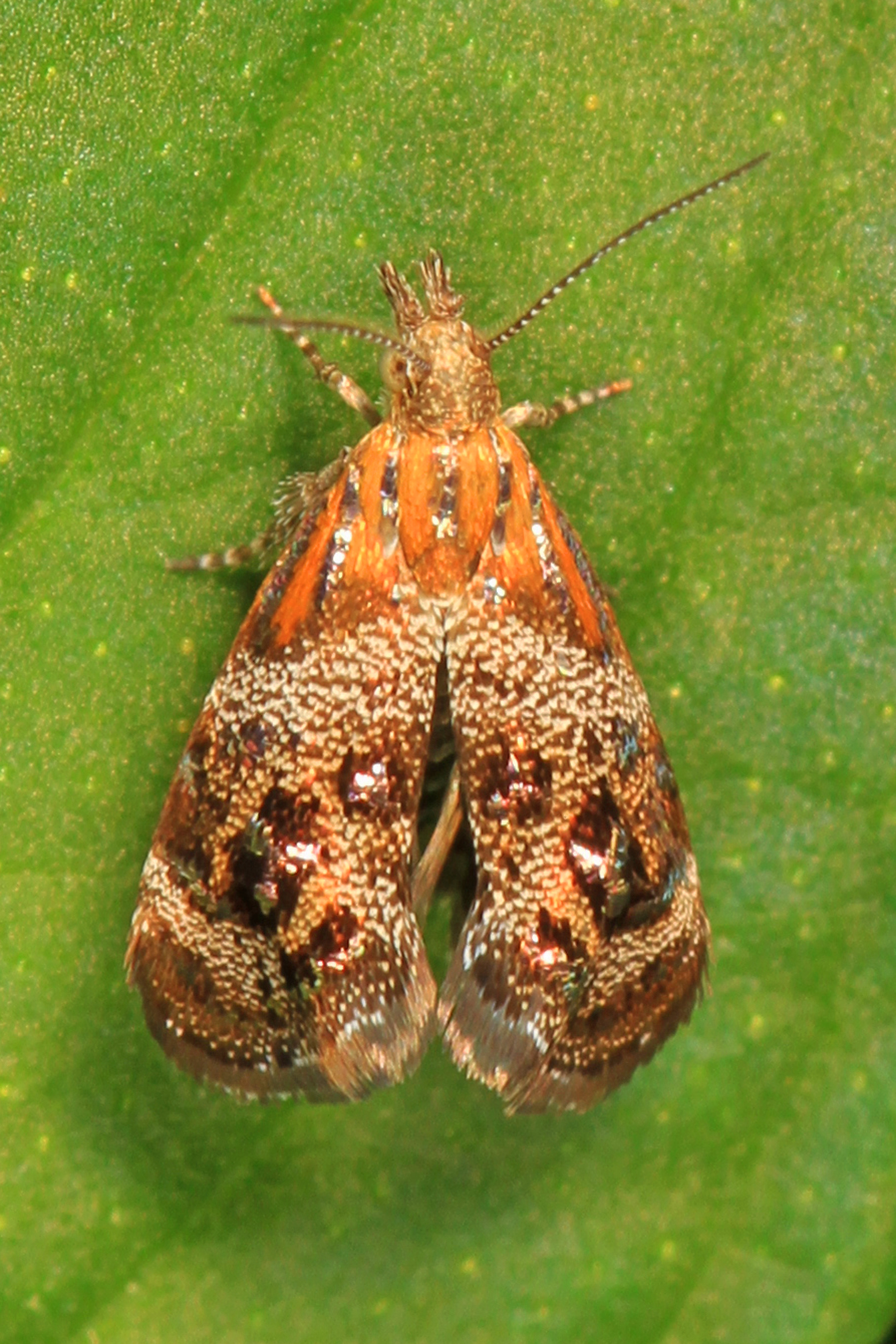

Scientific classification
- Kingdom: Animalia
- Phylum: Arthropoda
- Class: Insecta
- Order: Lepidoptera
- Family: Choreutidae
- Genus: Tebenna
- Species: T. gnaphaliella

Binomial name
- Tebenna gnaphaliella (Kearfott, 1902)

Synonyms
- Choreutis gnaphaliella Kearfott, 1902

= Tebenna gnaphaliella =

Species of moth

Tebenna gnaphaliella, the everlasting tebenna moth, is a moth of the family Choreutidae. It is found from Florida to California and north at least to New Hampshire.

The wingspan is about 10 mm. It is extremely similar/identical to the Palearctic Tebenna micalis.

Adults are on wing in June and July. There are probably at least two generations per year. They are usually found on flowers of herbaceous plants.

The larvae feed on various plants (cudweed, everlasting, pussytoes) formerly placed in the genus Gnaphalium, including Pseudognaphalium obtusifolium, Pseudognaphalium helleri, and Helichrysum species. They mine the leaves of their host plant.
