= Tebenna chingana =

Scientific classification
- Domain: Eukaryota
- Kingdom: Animalia
- Phylum: Arthropoda
- Class: Insecta
- Order: Lepidoptera
- Family: Choreutidae
- Genus: Tebenna
- Species: T. chingana

Binomial name
- Tebenna chingana Danilevsky, 1969

Synonyms
- Tebeuna chingana Danilevsky, 1969

Species of moth

Tebenna chingana is a moth of the family Choreutidae. It is found from Czech Republic, Ukraine and the Khingan Range in Russia.
