= Tebenna carduiella =

Scientific classification
- Domain: Eukaryota
- Kingdom: Animalia
- Phylum: Arthropoda
- Class: Insecta
- Order: Lepidoptera
- Family: Choreutidae
- Genus: Tebenna
- Species: T. carduiella

Binomial name
- Tebenna carduiella (Kearfott, 1902)

Synonyms
- Choreutis carduiella Kearfott, 1902

Species of moth

Tebenna carduiella is a moth of the family Choreutidae. It is found in the United States from New Jersey to Florida and west to Texas.

The wingspan is about 13 mm.

The larvae feed on Cirsium species. They bore the stems of their host plant.
