= Tebenna balsamorrhizella =

Scientific classification
- Kingdom: Animalia
- Phylum: Arthropoda
- Clade: Pancrustacea
- Class: Insecta
- Order: Lepidoptera
- Family: Choreutidae
- Genus: Tebenna
- Species: T. balsamorrhizella

Binomial name
- Tebenna balsamorrhizella (Busck, 1904)

Synonyms
- Choreutis balsamorrhizella Busck, 1904

Species of moth

Tebenna balsamorrhizella is a moth of the family Choreutidae. It is known from northern North America, including Montana, Utah, British Columbia and Alberta.
