= Tebenna galapagoensis =

Scientific classification
- Kingdom: Animalia
- Phylum: Arthropoda
- Clade: Pancrustacea
- Class: Insecta
- Order: Lepidoptera
- Family: Choreutidae
- Genus: Tebenna
- Species: T. galapagoensis

Binomial name
- Tebenna galapagoensis Heppner & Landry, 1994

Species of moth

Tebenna galapagoensis is a moth in the family Choreutidae. It was described by John B. Heppner and Bernard Landry in 1994. It is found on the Galápagos Islands.
