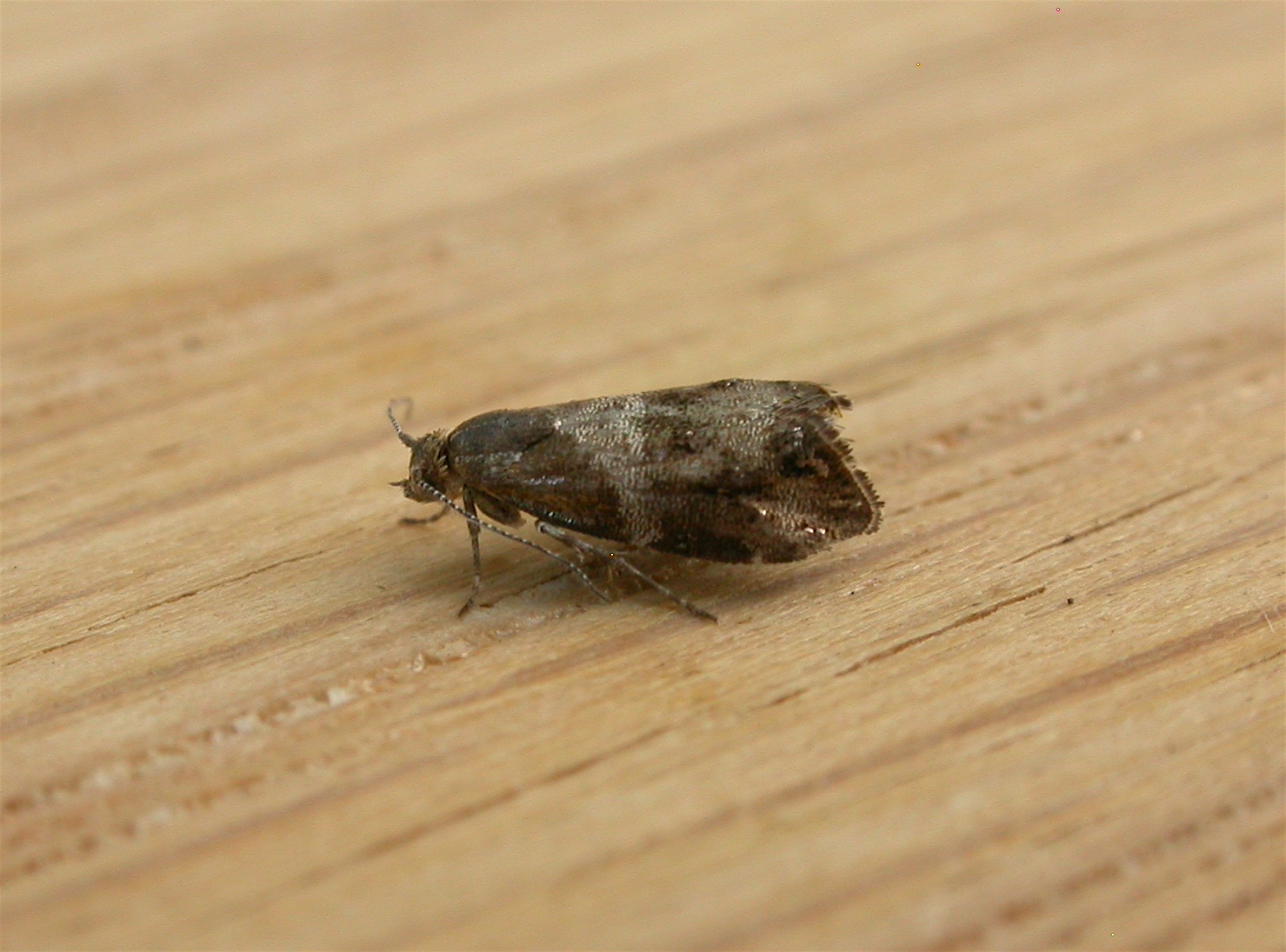

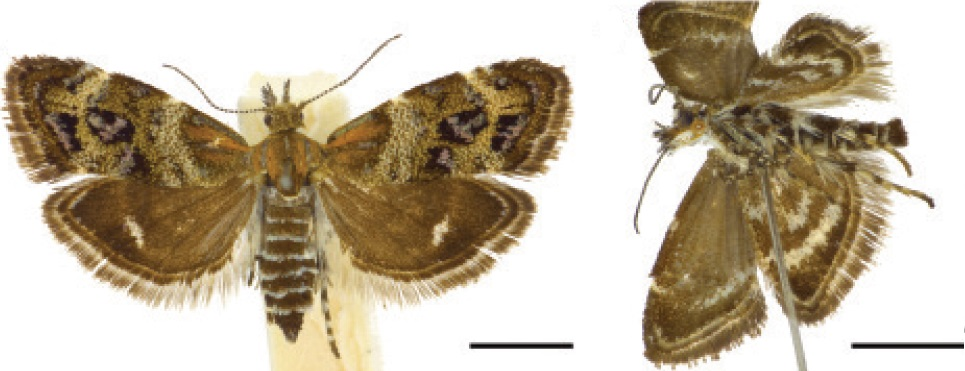

Scientific classification
- Domain: Eukaryota
- Kingdom: Animalia
- Phylum: Arthropoda
- Class: Insecta
- Order: Lepidoptera
- Family: Choreutidae
- Genus: Tebenna
- Species: T. micalis

Binomial name
- Tebenna micalis (Mann, 1857)

Synonyms
- Choreutis isshiki Matsumura, 1931; Tebenna isshiki; Tebenna bradleyi Clarke, 1971; Choreutis australis Zeller, 1852

= Tebenna micalis =

Species of moth

Tebenna micalis, also known as the small thistle moth, is a species of moth in the family Choreutidae found worldwide. It was first described by the German Bohemian entomologist, Joseph Johann Mann in 1857.

== Description ==
The wingspan is about 13 millimetres (0.51 in). It is similar in appearance to the Nearctic Tebenna gnaphaliella and can be found between June and August. It comes to light and can be found during the day on the flowers of the larval foodplant.

The larvae feed on Asteraceae within a blotch, sometimes leaving the mine and starting another. Later instars can live freely in a web on the leaf. Larval foodplants recorded include, on common fleabane (Pulicaria dysenterica) in the United Kingdom. In Australia on capeweed (Arctotheca calendula), spear thistle (Cirsium vulgare), horseweed (Erigeron canadensis), cotton thistle (Onopordum acanthium) and golden everlasting (Xerochrysum bracteatum); and in Réunion on globe artichoke (Cynara scolymus).

Larvae pupate on the underside of a leaf of the host plant, in a spindle-shaped cocoon.

== Distribution ==
In Europe it is found south of the line Ireland, Great Britain, France and Slovakia. In Britain it is an immigrant that occurs irregularly, since it was first discovered in the 1980s. Outside of Europe, it has been recorded from China (Henan, Hubei, Jiangxi, Tibet, Zhejiang), Nepal, Russia, Japan (Honshu, Ryukyu Islands), Afghanistan, Tajikistan, Uzbekistan, Turkmenistan, Canary Islands, North Africa, Arabia, Asia Minor, Zakavkazye, Iran, Lebanon, New Zealand, and the Oriental, Ethiopian, Australian and Nearctic regions.

== Subspecies ==
- Tebenna micalis micalis
- Tebenna micalis dialecta Diakonoff, 1985 (Madagascar, Mauritius, Namibia and South Africa)
