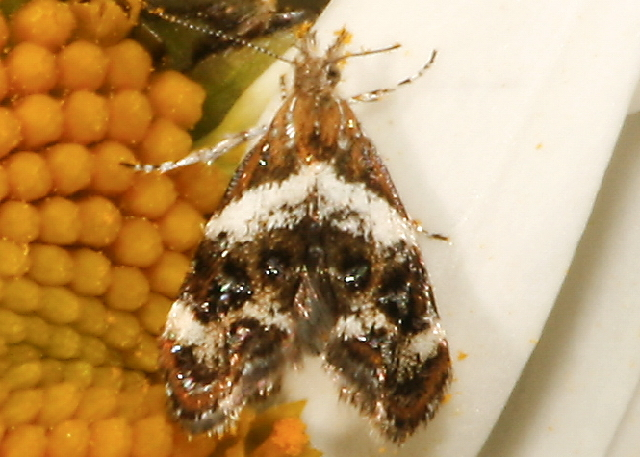

Scientific classification
- Kingdom: Animalia
- Phylum: Arthropoda
- Class: Insecta
- Order: Lepidoptera
- Family: Choreutidae
- Genus: Tebenna
- Species: T. onustana

Binomial name
- Tebenna onustana (Walker, 1864)

Synonyms
- Simaethis onustana Walker, 1864

= Tebenna onustana =

Species of moth

Tebenna onustana is a moth of the family Choreutidae. It is known from Ontario, Quebec and the north-eastern part of the United States.
