= Tebenna chodzhajevi =

Scientific classification
- Domain: Eukaryota
- Kingdom: Animalia
- Phylum: Arthropoda
- Class: Insecta
- Order: Lepidoptera
- Family: Choreutidae
- Genus: Tebenna
- Species: T. chodzhajevi

Binomial name
- Tebenna chodzhajevi (Gerasimov, 1930)

Synonyms
- Choreutis chodzhajevi Gerasimov, 1930

Species of moth

Tebenna chodzhajevi is a moth in the family Choreutidae. It was described by Aleksey Maksimovich Gerasimov in 1930. It is found in the Uzbek region Bukhara (Samarkand, Kitab, Takhta Karacha Pass).

The larvae feed on Codonocephalum grande.
