= Pseudognaphalium cheiranthifolium =

Scientific classification
- Kingdom: Plantae
- Clade: Tracheophytes
- Clade: Angiosperms
- Clade: Eudicots
- Clade: Asterids
- Order: Asterales
- Family: Asteraceae
- Genus: Pseudognaphalium
- Species: P. cheiranthifolium

Binomial name
- Pseudognaphalium cheiranthifolium (Lam.) Hilliard & B.L.Burtt

Synonyms
- Gnaphalion dysodum St.-Lag.; Gnaphalium acutifolium Phil.; Gnaphalium araucanum Phil.; Gnaphalium cheiranthemifolium Pers.; Gnaphalium cheiranthifolium Lam.; Gnaphalium citrinum Hook. & Arn.; Gnaphalium ecuadorense var. boliviense Cuatrec.; Gnaphalium ecuadorense Hieron.; Gnaphalium gaudichaudianum var. subrufescens DC.; Gnaphalium paniculatum Colla; Gnaphalium pellitum Kunth; Gnaphalium regnellii Sch.Bip.; Gnaphalium riedelianum Klatt; Gnaphalium valdivianum Phil.; Gnaphalium valdiviense Sch.Bip., nom. nud.; Gnaphalium viscosum Poepp. ex DC.; Pseudognaphalium pellitum (Kunth) Anderb.

Species of flowering plant

Pseudognaphalium cheiranthifolium, synonyms including Gnaphalium cheiranthifolium and Gnaphalium ecuadorense, is a species of flowering plant in the family Asteraceae. It is native to South America, from Colombia to southern Chile.
