= Tebenna chrysotacta =

Scientific classification
- Kingdom: Animalia
- Phylum: Arthropoda
- Class: Insecta
- Order: Lepidoptera
- Family: Choreutidae
- Genus: Tebenna
- Species: T. chrysotacta

Binomial name
- Tebenna chrysotacta (Meyrick, 1933)

Synonyms
- Choreutis chrysotacta Meyrick, 1933; Choreutis chrysostacta; Tebenna chrysostacta

Species of moth

Tebenna chrysotacta is a moth in the family Choreutidae. It was described by Edward Meyrick in 1933. It is found on Java in Indonesia.
