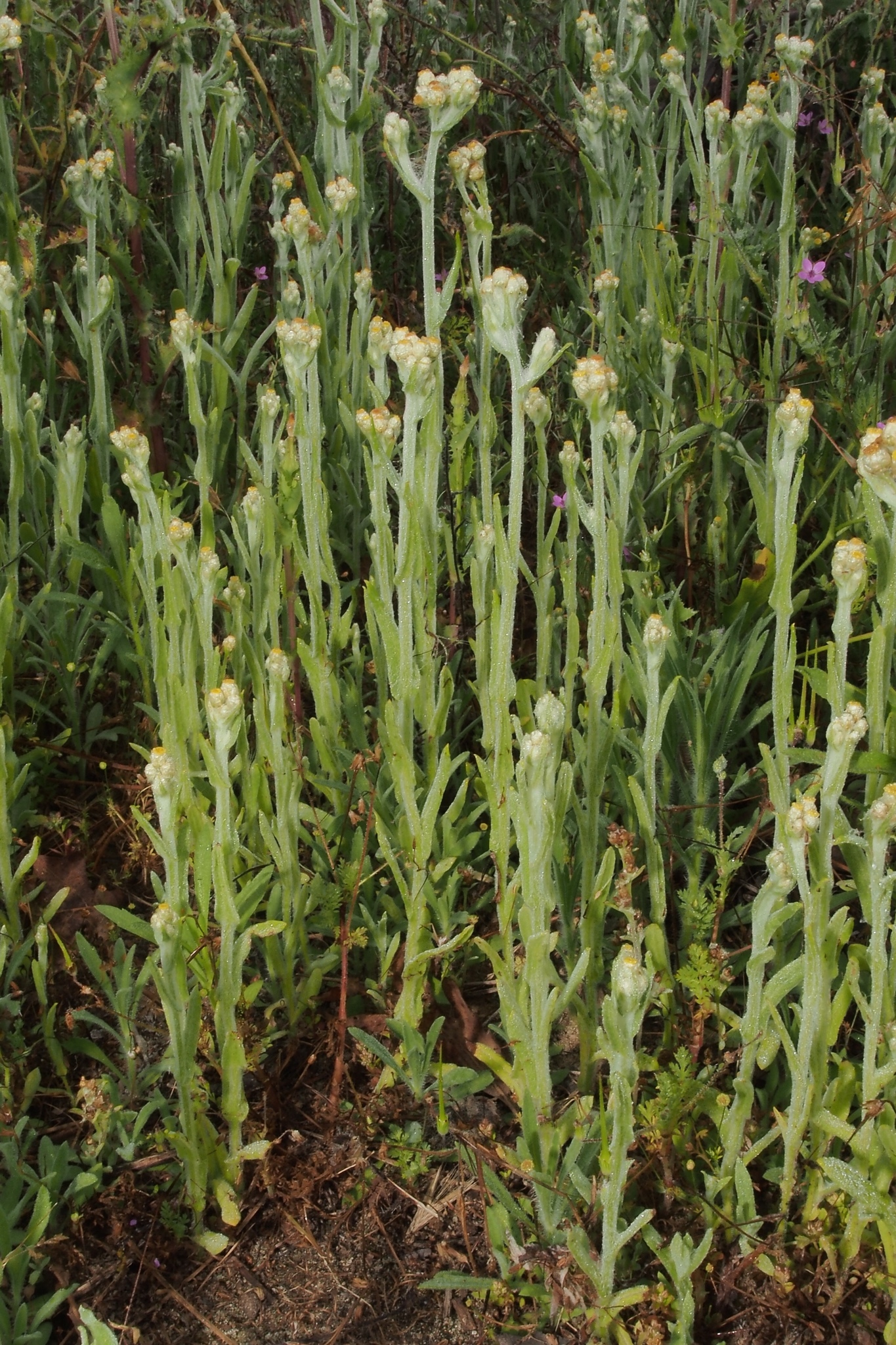
- Pseudognaphalium stramineum plants, San Diego County, California

Conservation status
- Secure (NatureServe)

Scientific classification
- Kingdom: Plantae
- Clade: Tracheophytes
- Clade: Angiosperms
- Clade: Eudicots
- Clade: Asterids
- Order: Asterales
- Family: Asteraceae
- Genus: Pseudognaphalium
- Species: P. stramineum

Binomial name
- Pseudognaphalium stramineum (Kunth) Anderb.

Synonyms
- List: Gnaphalium stramineum Kunth (1818); Gnaphalium berlandieri DC. (1838); Gnaphalium chilense Spreng. (1826); Gnaphalium chilense var. confertifolia Greene (1894); Gnaphalium gossypinum Nutt. (1841); Gnaphalium lagopodioides Rydb. (1900); Gnaphalium luteoalbum var. sprengelii (Hook. & Arn.) D.C.Eaton (1871); Gnaphalium proximum Greene (1902); Gnaphalium sprengelii Hook. & Arn. (1833); Gnaphalium sulphurescens Rydb. (1900)

= Pseudognaphalium stramineum =

Plant species in the sunflower family

Pseudognaphalium stramineum, also known as cotton-batting-plant, is an annual or biennial species of plant in the sunflower family. It is known for being covered in dense, loose hairs on its leaves and stems.

== Taxonomy ==
Pseudognaphalium stramineum was scientifically described by Carl Sigismund Kunth in 1818 with the name Gnaphalium stramineum. In 1991 it was moved to the genus Pseudognaphalium by Arne A. Anderberg.

== Range ==
Pseudognaphalium stramineum grows throughout western North America from British Columbia to Central America. In Canada it only grows in British Columbia. In the United States it grows in every state from the Pacific coast to the Rocky Mountains and is particularly widespread in Arizona, California, Oregon, and Washington. East of the Rockies it is found in some of Texas, two counties in Oklahoma, and is reported from Nebraska without any location information. On the east coast it grows in just New York, Virginia, North Carolina, and South Carolina. In Mexico it is also quite widespread. In the northwest it grow in all four states, Baja California, Baja California Sur, Sonora, and Sinaloa. In the northeast it grows in ten of the eleven states, only being absent from Tamaulipas. In central Mexico it grows in the State of Mexico, Mexico City, Morelos, Puebla, and Tlaxcala. In the southwest it remains common, only being absent from Colima. It also grows in the state of Veracruz on the Gulf of Mexico. To the southeast it becomes less common, being found in just Chiapas. In Central America it is found in three countries, Costa Rica, Guatemala, and Honduras. It is also found as an introduced plant in the United Kingdom.
