= Tebenna fuscidorsis =

Scientific classification
- Kingdom: Animalia
- Phylum: Arthropoda
- Clade: Pancrustacea
- Class: Insecta
- Order: Lepidoptera
- Family: Choreutidae
- Genus: Tebenna
- Species: T. fuscidorsis

Binomial name
- Tebenna fuscidorsis (Zeller, 1877)

Synonyms
- Choreutis fuscidorsis Zeller, 1877

Species of moth

Tebenna fuscidorsis is a moth in the family Choreutidae. It was described by Zeller in 1877.
