= Tebenna immutabilis =

Scientific classification
- Domain: Eukaryota
- Kingdom: Animalia
- Phylum: Arthropoda
- Class: Insecta
- Order: Lepidoptera
- Family: Choreutidae
- Genus: Tebenna
- Species: T. immutabilis

Binomial name
- Tebenna immutabilis (Braun, 1927)

Synonyms
- Choreutis immutabilis Braun, 1927

Species of moth

Tebenna immutabilis is a moth of the family Choreutidae. It is known from the United States, including California.

The wingspan is 15–17 mm.
