= Tebenna yamashitai =

Scientific classification
- Kingdom: Animalia
- Phylum: Arthropoda
- Clade: Pancrustacea
- Class: Insecta
- Order: Lepidoptera
- Family: Choreutidae
- Genus: Tebenna
- Species: T. yamashitai

Binomial name
- Tebenna yamashitai Arita, 1987

Species of moth

Tebenna yamashitai is a moth in the family Choreutidae. It was described by Yutaka Arita in 1987. It is found in Japan.
