= Tebenna agelasta =

Scientific classification
- Kingdom: Animalia
- Phylum: Arthropoda
- Class: Insecta
- Order: Lepidoptera
- Family: Choreutidae
- Genus: Tebenna
- Species: T. agelasta

Binomial name
- Tebenna agelasta (Bradley, 1965)

Synonyms
- Choreutis agelasta Bradley 1965

Species of moth

Tebenna agelasta is a moth of the family Choreutidae. It is known from Uganda.
