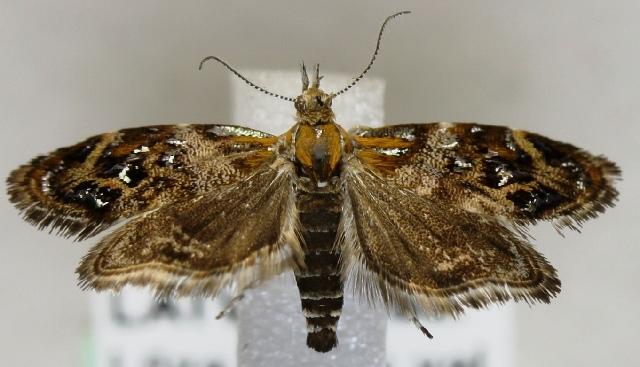

Scientific classification
- Domain: Eukaryota
- Kingdom: Animalia
- Phylum: Arthropoda
- Class: Insecta
- Order: Lepidoptera
- Family: Choreutidae
- Genus: Tebenna
- Species: T. pretiosana

Binomial name
- Tebenna pretiosana (Duponchel, 1842)

Synonyms
- Xylopoda pretiosana Duponchel, 1842; Tinea prunnerella Rossi, 1794 (Nomen dubium); Tebenna bjerkandrella pretiosana

= Tebenna pretiosana =

Species of moth

Tebenna pretiosana is a moth of the family Choreutidae. It is known from Finland, Estonia, France, Spain, Italy (including Sardinia and Sicily), Greece, Bosnia and Herzegovina and Croatia.
