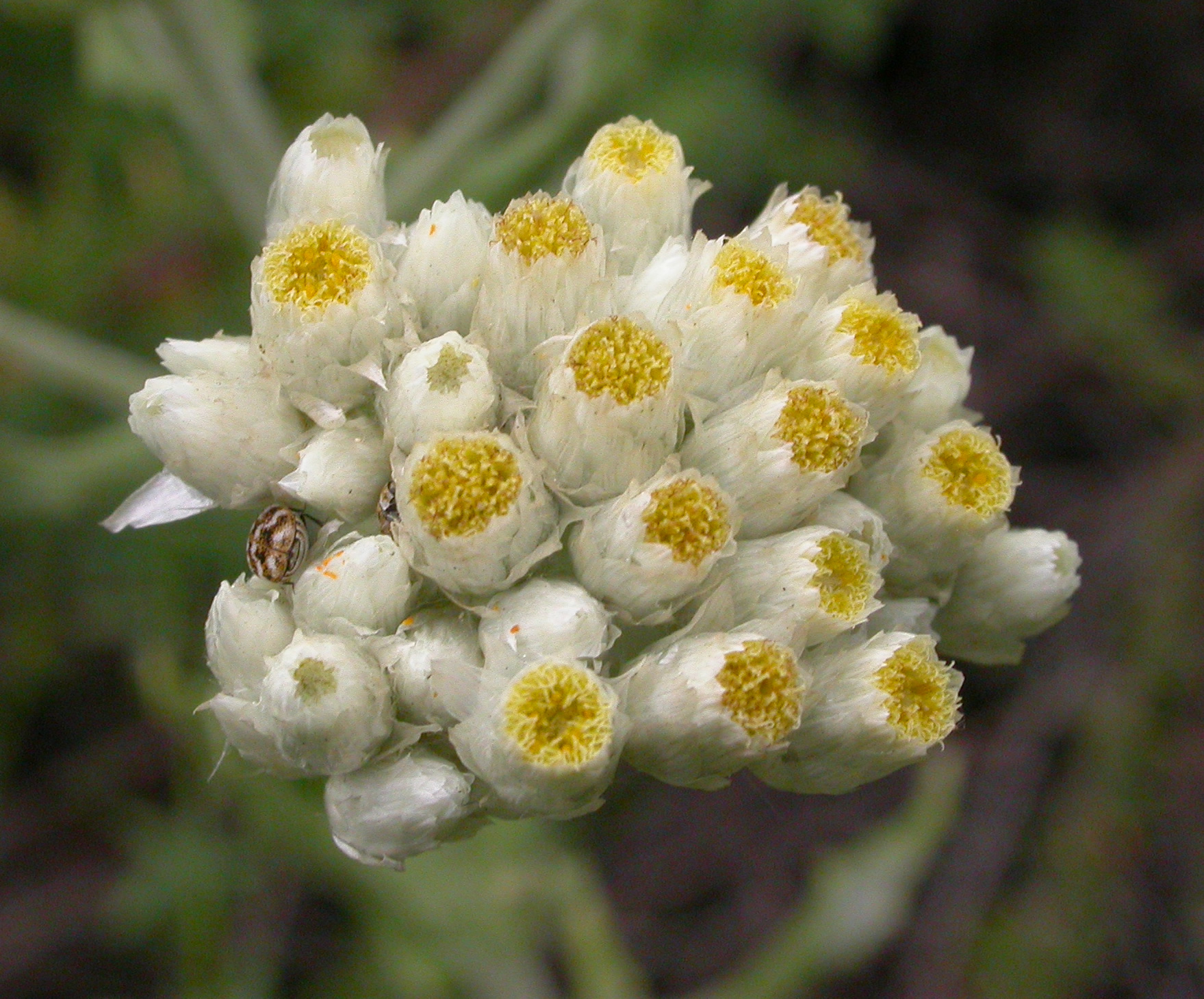

Scientific classification
- Kingdom: Plantae
- Clade: Tracheophytes
- Clade: Angiosperms
- Clade: Eudicots
- Clade: Asterids
- Order: Asterales
- Family: Asteraceae
- Genus: Pseudognaphalium
- Species: P. californicum

Binomial name
- Pseudognaphalium californicum (DC.) Anderb.

Synonyms
- Gnaphalium californicum (DC.)

= Pseudognaphalium californicum =

Species of plant

Pseudognaphalium californicum (syn. Gnaphalium californicum) is a species of flowering plant in the family Asteraceae known by several common names, including ladies' tobacco, California rabbit tobacco, California cudweed, and California everlasting.

The plant is native to the west coast of North America from Washington to Baja California, where it is a member of the flora of many habitats, including chaparral.

== Description ==
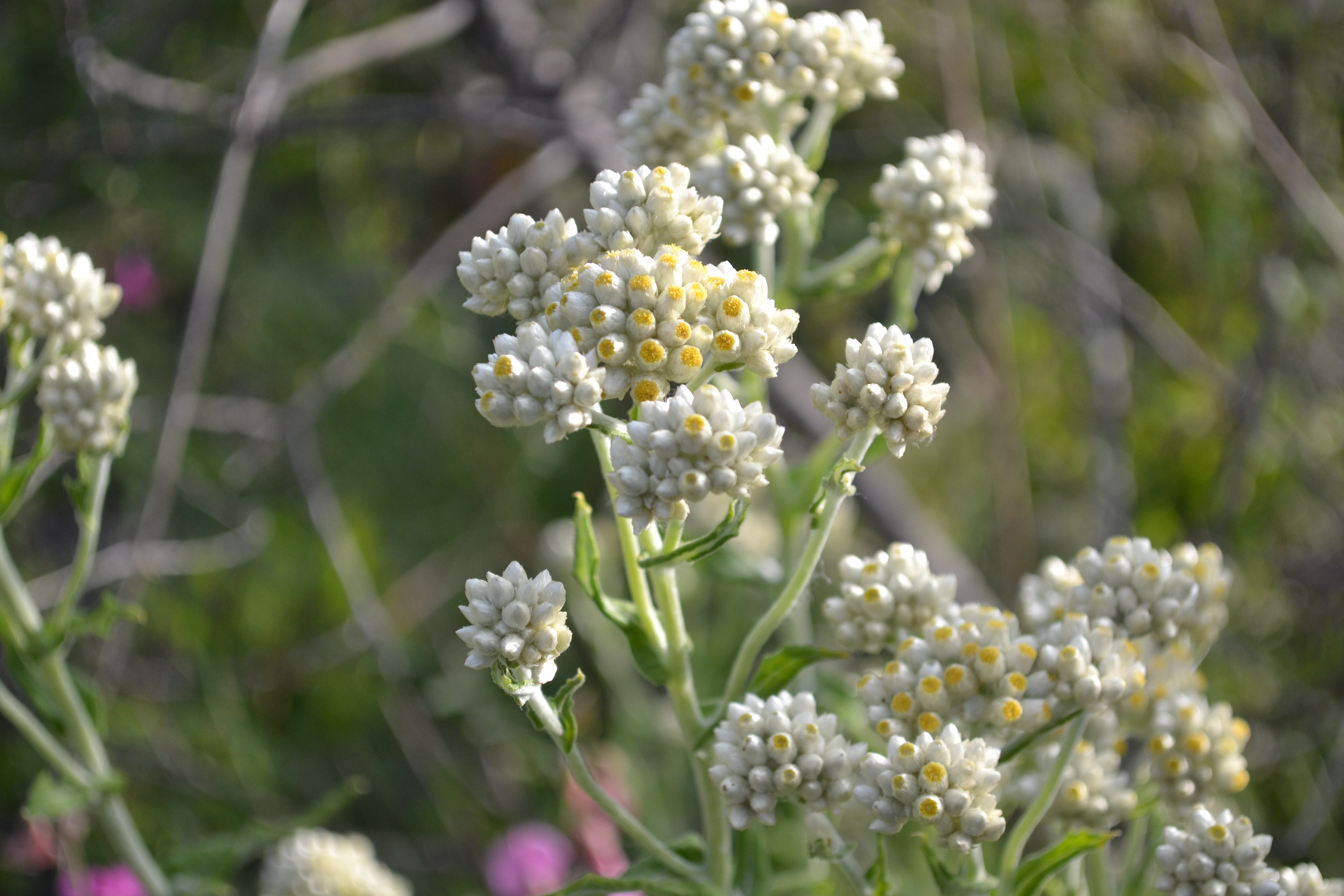

Pseudognaphalium californicum is an annual or biennial herb growing a branching stem reaching 20 to 80 centimeters in height. Stem branches bear linear to somewhat lance-shaped leaves 2 to 20 centimeters long. The green herbage is glandular and scented. The leaves produce a distinctive citrus aroma.

The inflorescence is a wide cluster of flower heads, each enveloped in an involucre of rows of bright white phyllaries.

== Classification ==
Classification is disputed between the genera Pseudognaphalium and Gnaphalium.

== Images ==
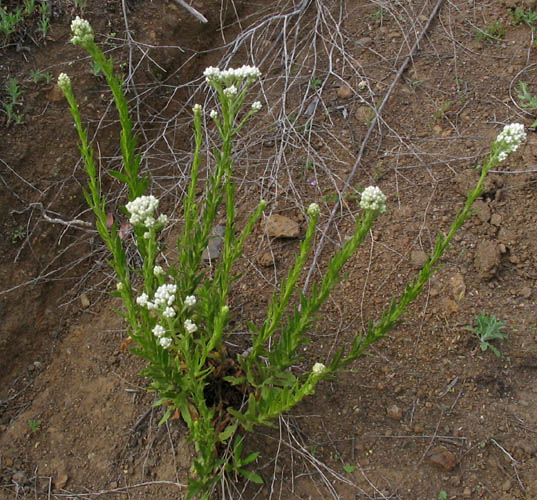
California rabbit tobacco

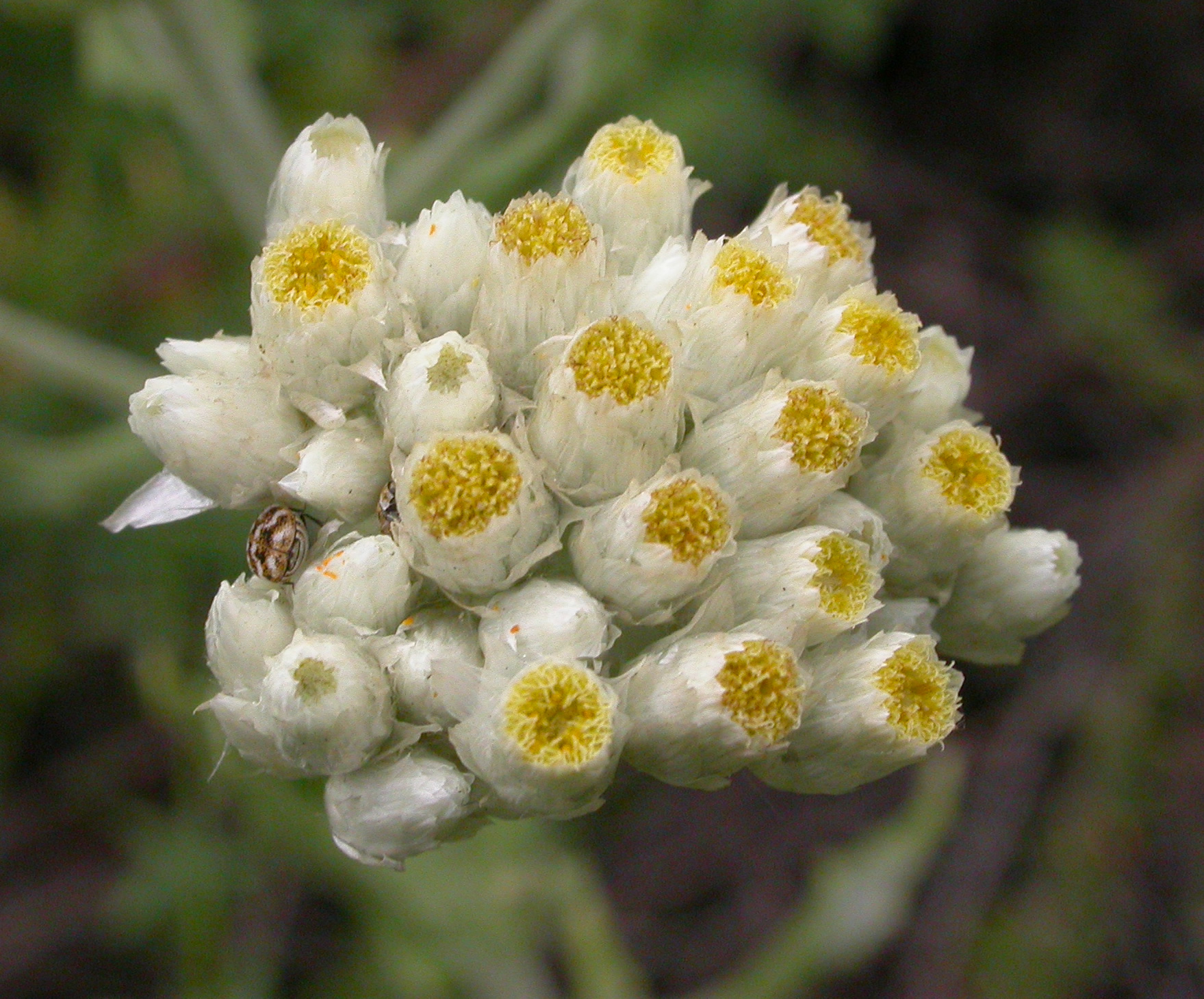
Also California cudweed

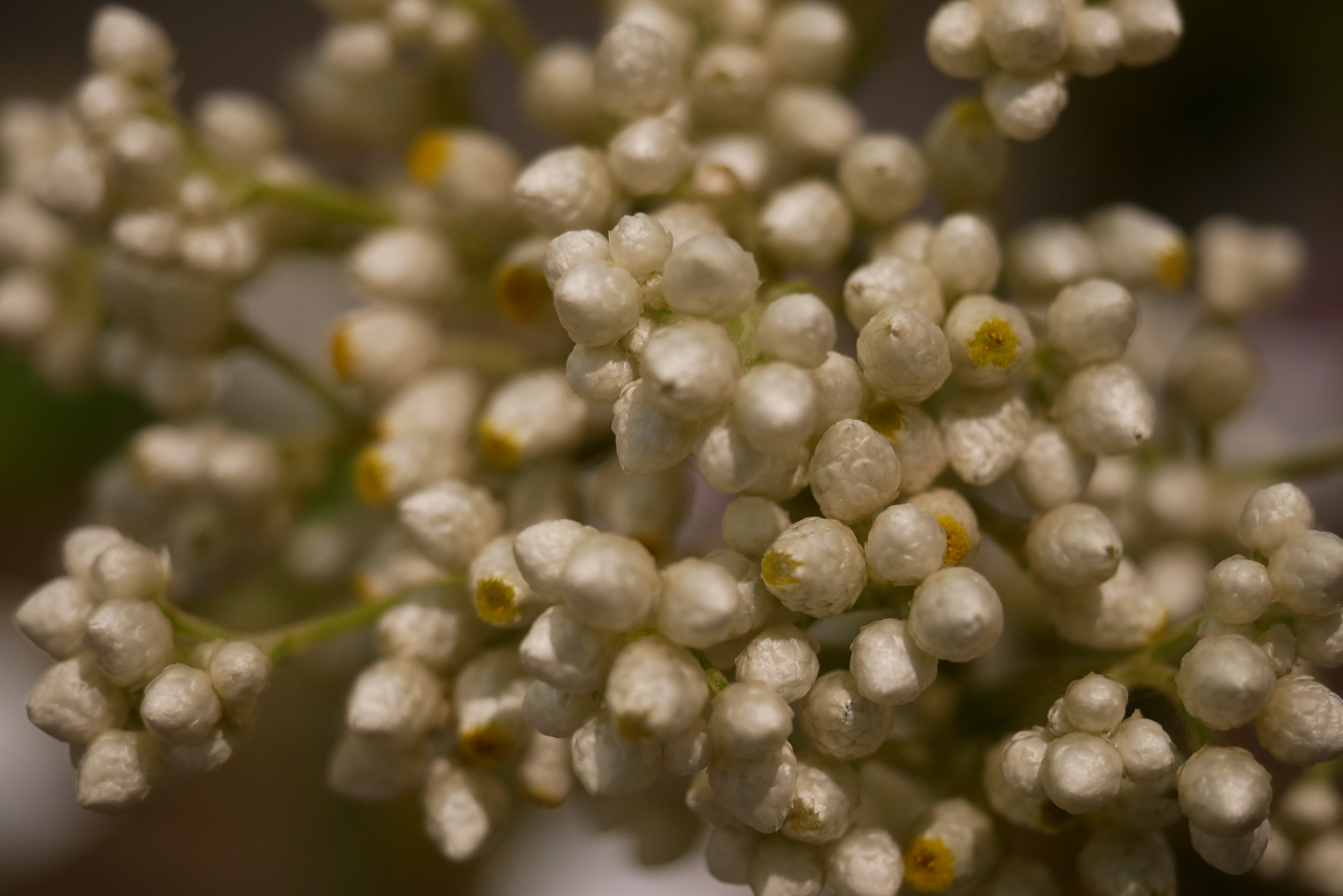
Alternate varietal

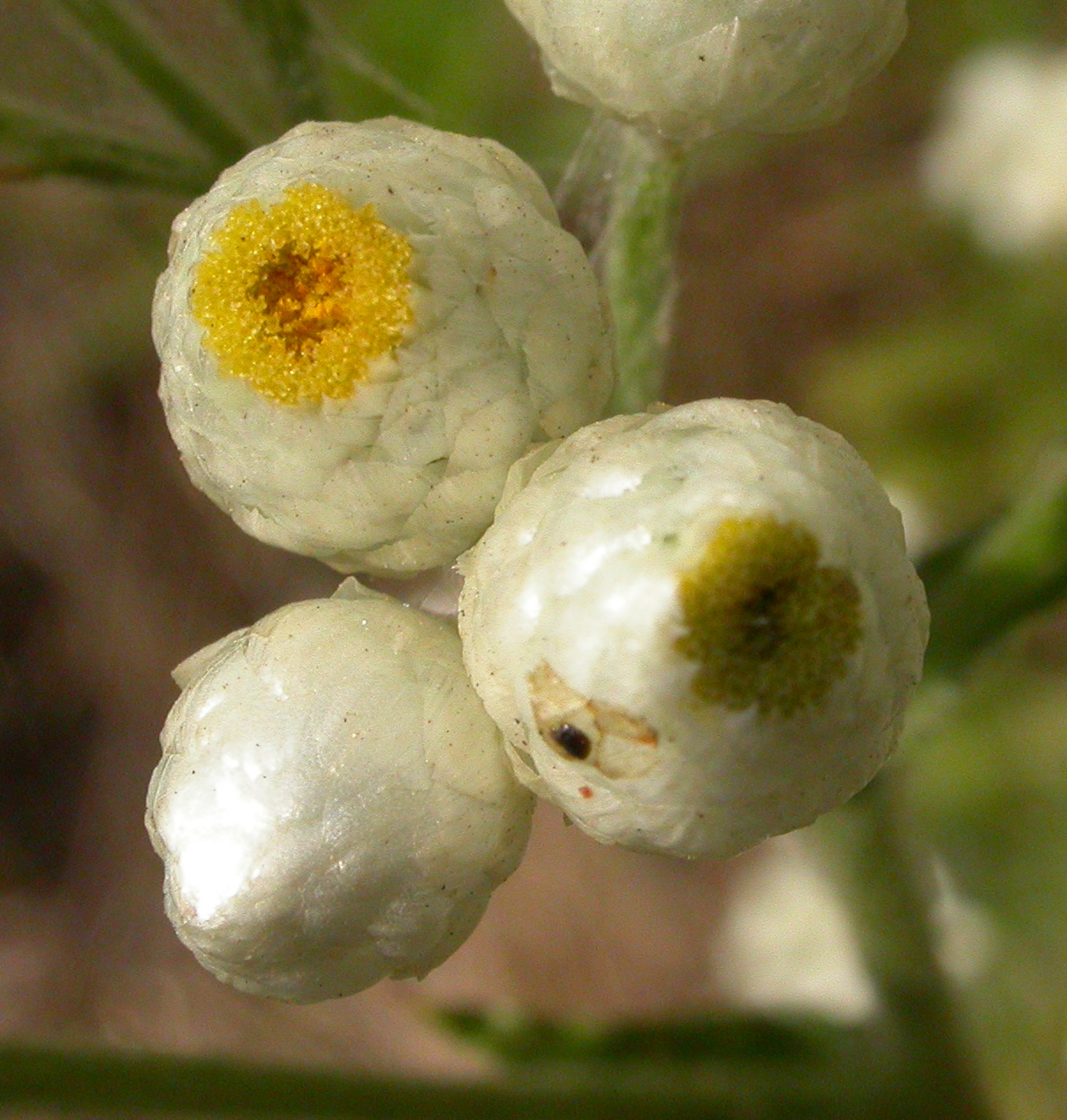
Macro view of bisexual outer flowers
