= Tebenna leptilonella =

Scientific classification
- Kingdom: Animalia
- Phylum: Arthropoda
- Clade: Pancrustacea
- Class: Insecta
- Order: Lepidoptera
- Family: Choreutidae
- Genus: Tebenna
- Species: T. leptilonella

Binomial name
- Tebenna leptilonella (Busck, 1934)

Synonyms
- Choreutis leptilonella Busck, 1934

Species of moth

Tebenna leptilonella is a moth in the family Choreutidae. It was described by August Busck in 1934. It is found in Cuba.
