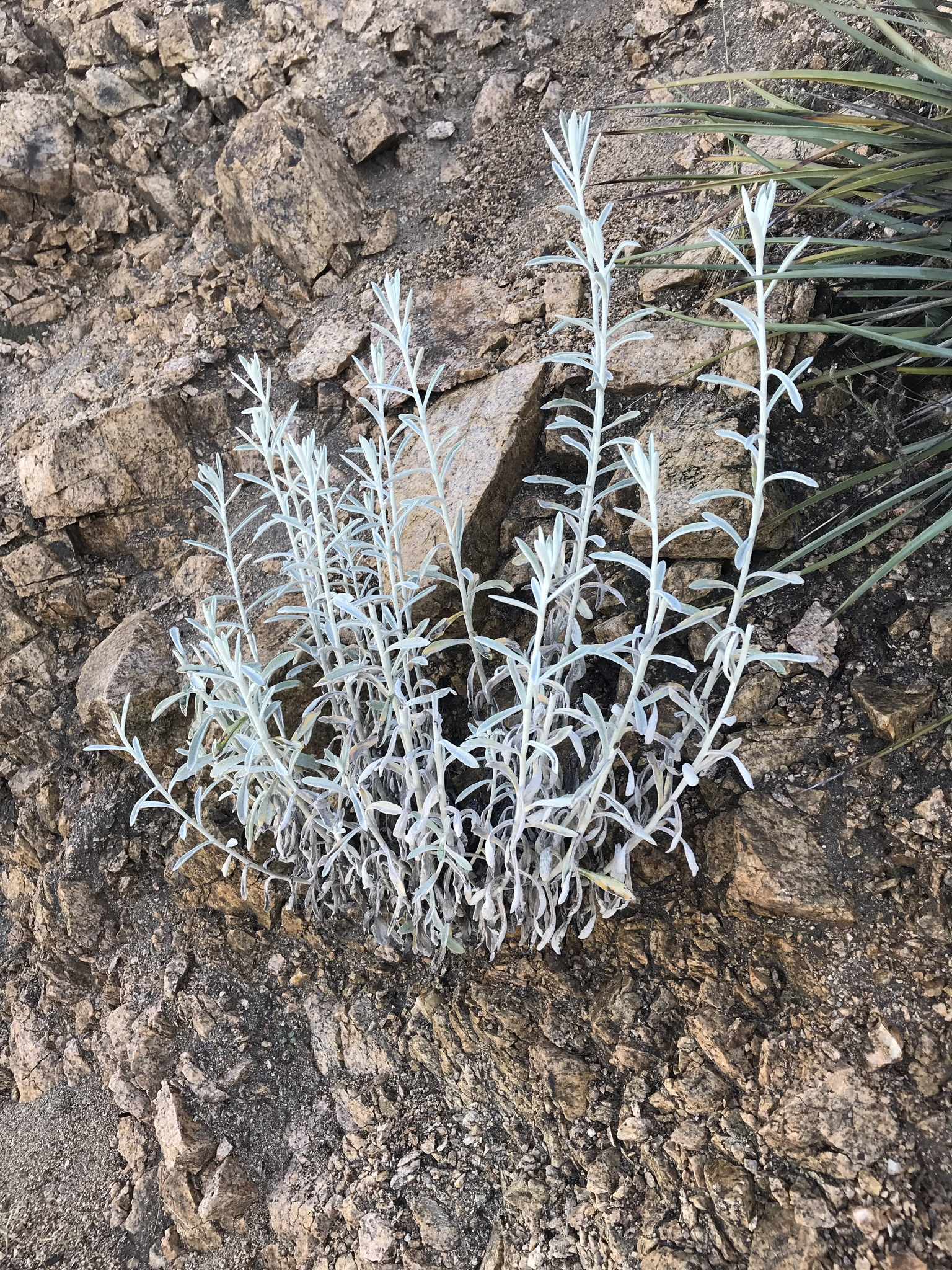

Scientific classification
- Kingdom: Plantae
- Clade: Tracheophytes
- Clade: Angiosperms
- Clade: Eudicots
- Clade: Asterids
- Order: Asterales
- Family: Asteraceae
- Genus: Pseudognaphalium
- Species: P. microcephalum

Binomial name
- Pseudognaphalium microcephalum (Nutt.) Anderb., 1991

= Pseudognaphalium microcephalum =

Flowering plant

Pseudognaphalium microcephalum, also known as San Diego rabbit-tobacco, feltleaf everlasting, and Wright's cudweed, is a species of flowering plant. It is found on the west coast of the United States and Mexico.
