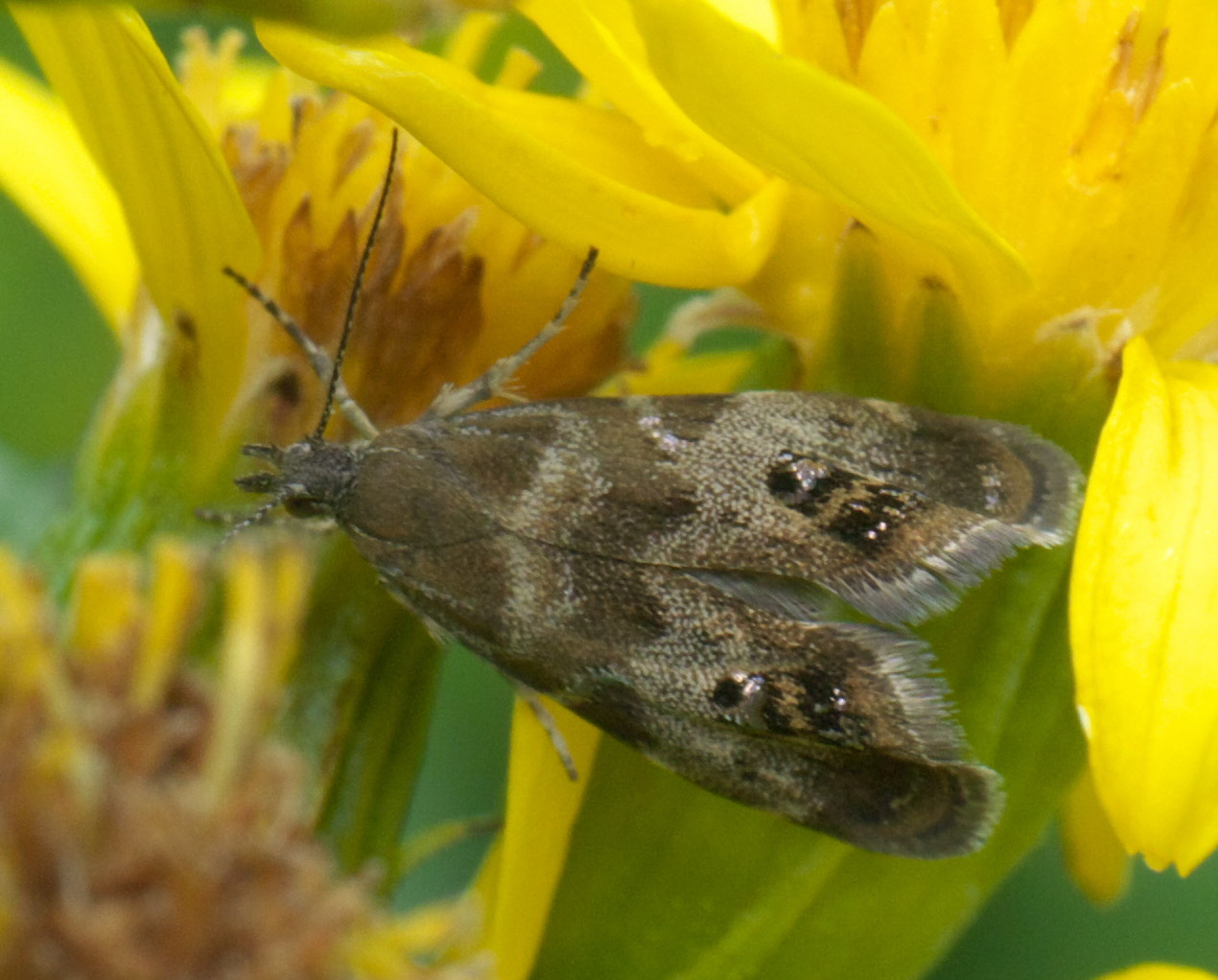

Scientific classification
- Kingdom: Animalia
- Phylum: Arthropoda
- Class: Insecta
- Order: Lepidoptera
- Family: Choreutidae
- Genus: Tebenna
- Species: T. silphiella

Binomial name
- Tebenna silphiella (Grote, 1881)

Synonyms
- Choreutis silphiella Grote, 1881

= Tebenna silphiella =

Species of moth

Tebenna silphiella, the rosinweed moth, is a moth of the family Choreutidae. It is known from the central part of the United States, including Wisconsin, Illinois and Colorado. The habitat consists of prairies and meadows.

Adults are on wing from early to late May. There are two generations per year.

The larvae feed on Silphium integrifolium. They skeletonize the leaves of their host plant, almost always on the top leaves (those at or near the apex). Full-grown larvae are about 12 mm long. Larvae have been recorded from May to June.
