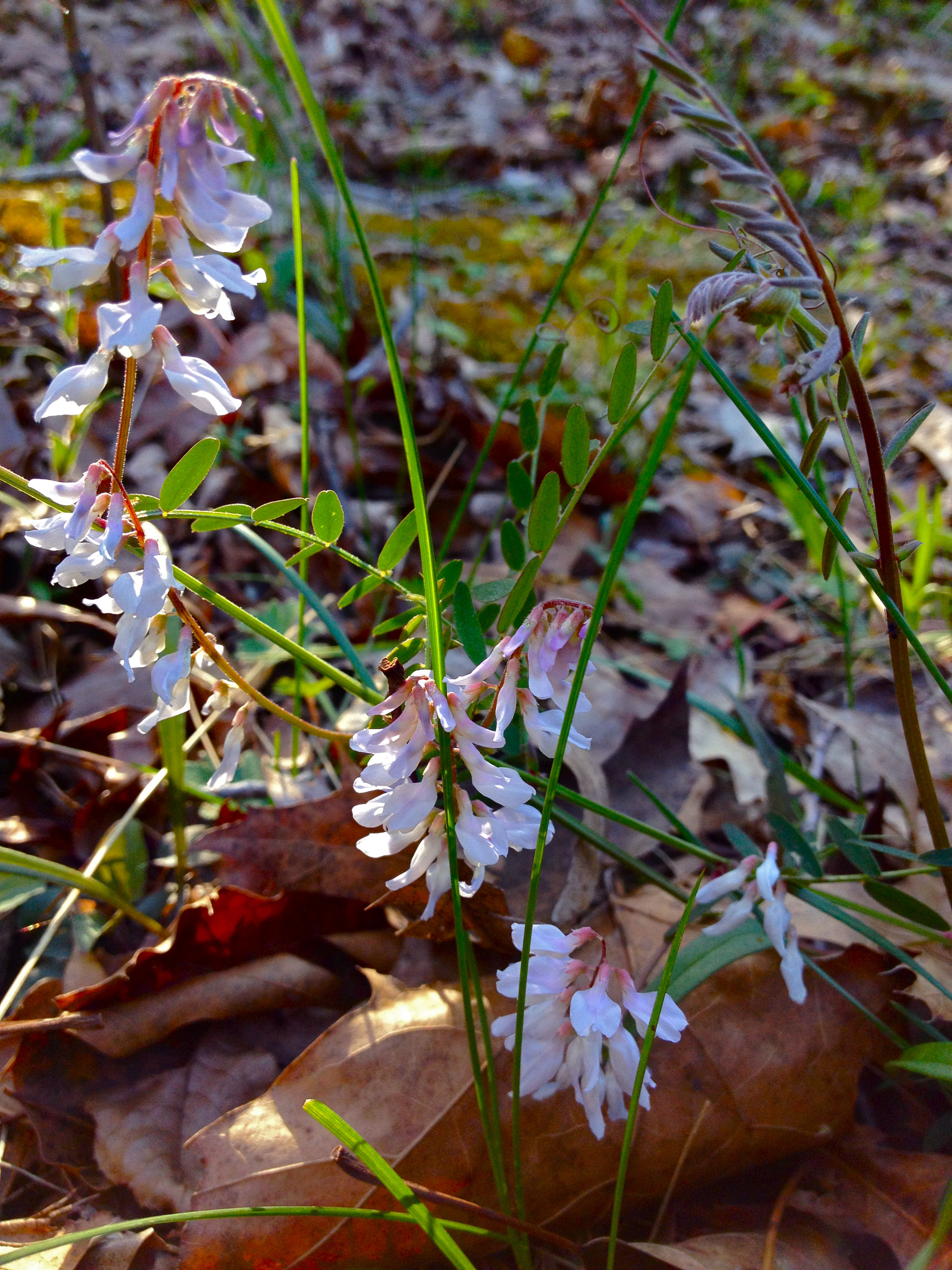

Conservation status
- Secure (NatureServe)

Scientific classification
- Kingdom: Plantae
- Clade: Tracheophytes
- Clade: Angiosperms
- Clade: Eudicots
- Clade: Rosids
- Order: Fabales
- Family: Fabaceae
- Subfamily: Faboideae
- Tribe: Fabeae
- Genus: Vicia
- Species: V. caroliniana

Binomial name
- Vicia caroliniana Walter

Synonyms
- Cracca caroliniana (Walter) Alef.; Ervum carolinianum (Walter) Stank.; Ervum hugeri (Small) Stank.; Vicia craccoides Raf.; Vicia hexameri Alef.; Vicia hugeri Small; Vicia parviflora Michx.

= Vicia caroliniana =

Carolina vetch

Species of legume

Vicia caroliniana (common name Carolina vetch, or Carolina wood vetch) is a plant found in North America. It is a perennial leguminous vine found in a variety of habitats.

== Description ==
The compound leaves of V. caroliniana are alternately arranged and the subalternate elliptical to lanceolate leaflets have hairy undersides. The leaves have paired stipules at their bases and terminate in single or bifurcated tendrils. The slightly winged stems are hollow. The flowers have five petals and are borne in inflorescences that originate in the leaf axils. The anthers are orange while the flower petals are pale purple to white. V. caroliniana produces dehiscent seed pods 1.5 to 3 centimetres (0.59 to 1.18 in) long.

== Uses ==
Native peoples of southeastern North America, including the Cherokee, use this plant for a variety of medicinal purposes. It is used for back pains, local pains, to toughen muscles, for muscular cramps, twitching and is rubbed on stomach cramps. They also use a compound for rheumatism, for an affliction called "blacks", and it is taken for wind before a ball game. An infusion is used for muscle pain, in that it is rubbed on scratches made over the location of the pain. An infusion is also taken as an emetic. It is also used internally with Pseudognaphalium obtusifolium ssp. obtusifolium for rheumatism.
