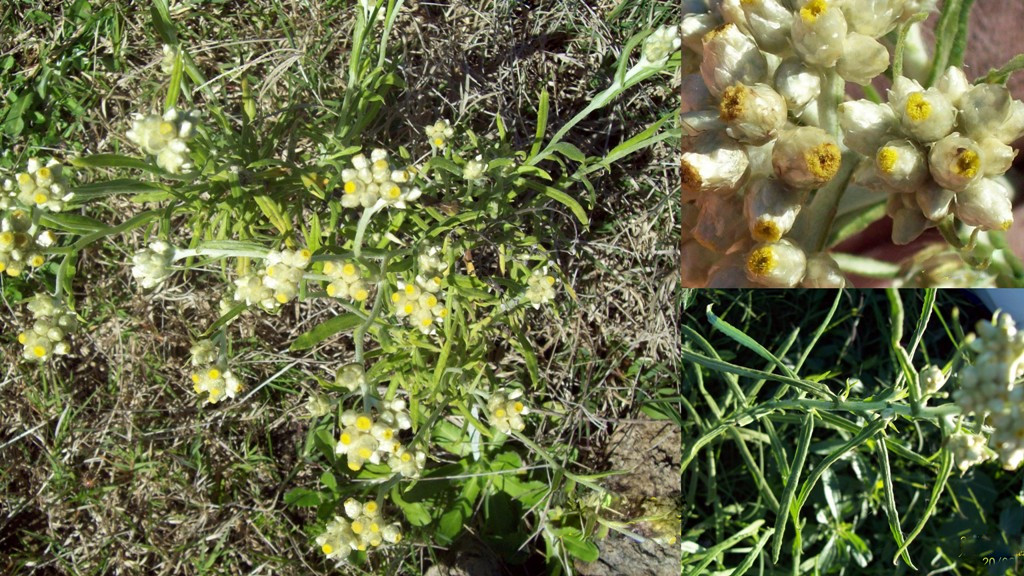
- Found in Southern Agentina

Scientific classification
- Kingdom: Plantae
- Clade: Tracheophytes
- Clade: Angiosperms
- Clade: Eudicots
- Clade: Asterids
- Order: Asterales
- Family: Asteraceae
- Genus: Pseudognaphalium
- Species: P. gaudichaudianum

Binomial name
- Pseudognaphalium gaudichaudianum (DC.) Anderb.

Synonyms
- Gnaphalium asperum Pers., nom. illeg.; Gnaphalium cabrerae S.E.Freire; Gnaphalium cheiranthifolium var. gaudichaudianum (DC.) Baker; Gnaphalium fastigiatum Phil.; Gnaphalium gaudichaudianum DC.; Gnaphalium imbaburense Hieron.; Gnaphalium jelskii Hieron.; Gnaphalium mandonii Sch.Bip., nom. nud.; Gnaphalium mendocinum Phil.; Gnaphalium persoonii F.Dietr., nom. superfl.; Gnaphalium peruvianum Spreng.; Gnaphalium philippii Cabrera; Gnaphalium sodiroi Hieron.; Pseudognaphalium austrobrasilicum Deble & Marchiori; Pseudognaphalium cabrerae (S.E.Freire) S.E.Freire, N.Bayón, C.M.Baeza, Giuliano & C.Monti; Pseudognaphalium fastigiatum N.Bayón; Pseudognaphalium mendocinum (Phil.) Deble & Marchiori

= Pseudognaphalium gaudichaudianum =

Species of flowering plant

Pseudognaphalium gaudichaudianum, synonyms including Gnaphalium imbaburense and Gnaphalium sodiroi, is a species of flowering plant in the family Asteraceae. It is widely distributed in South America, from Colombia in the north to southern Argentina.

== Conservation ==
Gnaphalium imbaburense was assessed as "data deficient" for the 2003 IUCN Red List. Gnaphalium sodiroi was assessed for the same list as "critically endangered". Both are said to be native only to Ecuador. As of April 2023, G. imbaburense and G. sodiroi were regarded as two of many synonyms of Pseudognaphalium gaudichaudianum, which has a much wider distribution.
