= Tebenna submicalis =

Scientific classification
- Domain: Eukaryota
- Kingdom: Animalia
- Phylum: Arthropoda
- Class: Insecta
- Order: Lepidoptera
- Family: Choreutidae
- Genus: Tebenna
- Species: T. submicalis

Binomial name
- Tebenna submicalis Danilevsky, 1969

Species of insect

Tebenna submicalis is a moth of the family Choreutidae. It is known from China (Shaanxi, Gansu, Hubei), Nepal, Russia and Japan (Hokkaido).

The wingspan is 9–11 mm.

The larvae feed on Anaphalis margaritacea.
