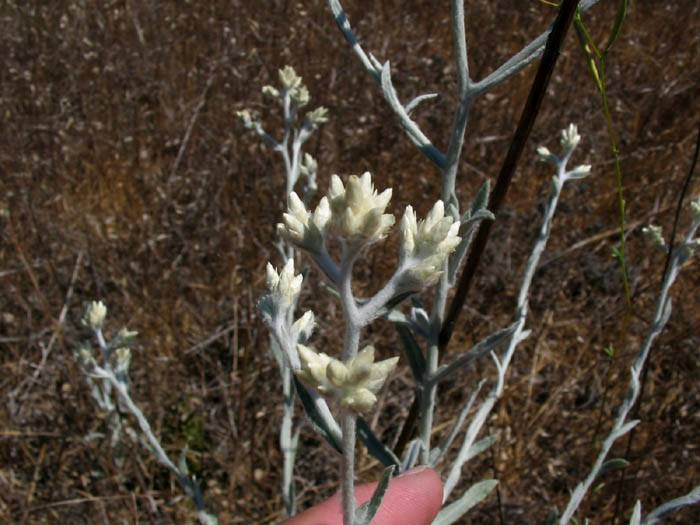

Conservation status
- Secure (NatureServe)

Scientific classification
- Kingdom: Plantae
- Clade: Tracheophytes
- Clade: Angiosperms
- Clade: Eudicots
- Clade: Asterids
- Order: Asterales
- Family: Asteraceae
- Genus: Pseudognaphalium
- Species: P. canescens

Binomial name
- Pseudognaphalium canescens (DC.) W.A.Weber

Synonyms
- Gnaphalium canescens

= Pseudognaphalium canescens =

Species of plant

Pseudognaphalium canescens (syn. Gnaphalium canescens) is a species of flowering plant in the family Asteraceae known by the common name Wright's cudweed.

It is native to western North America from western Canada to northern Mexico. It can be found in many habitats, from mountains to plateau to coastline. It is a biennial herb with white, wooly leaves. The many-branched stem is produced in the second year of growth, and is erect to a maximum height of around a meter. It is gray-green and woolly with many narrow leaves. Atop the stem branches are inflorescences of several pointed oval-shaped pale yellowish, cream, or white flower heads. Each woolly head is a few millimeters across and contains many tiny flowers.
