= Tebenna chrysoterma =

Scientific classification
- Kingdom: Animalia
- Phylum: Arthropoda
- Class: Insecta
- Order: Lepidoptera
- Family: Choreutidae
- Genus: Tebenna
- Species: T. chrysoterma

Binomial name
- Tebenna chrysoterma (Meyrick, 1932)

Synonyms
- Choreutis chrysoterma Meyrick, 1932

Species of moth

Tebenna chrysoterma is a moth in the family Choreutidae. It was described by Edward Meyrick in 1932. It is found in Bolivia.
