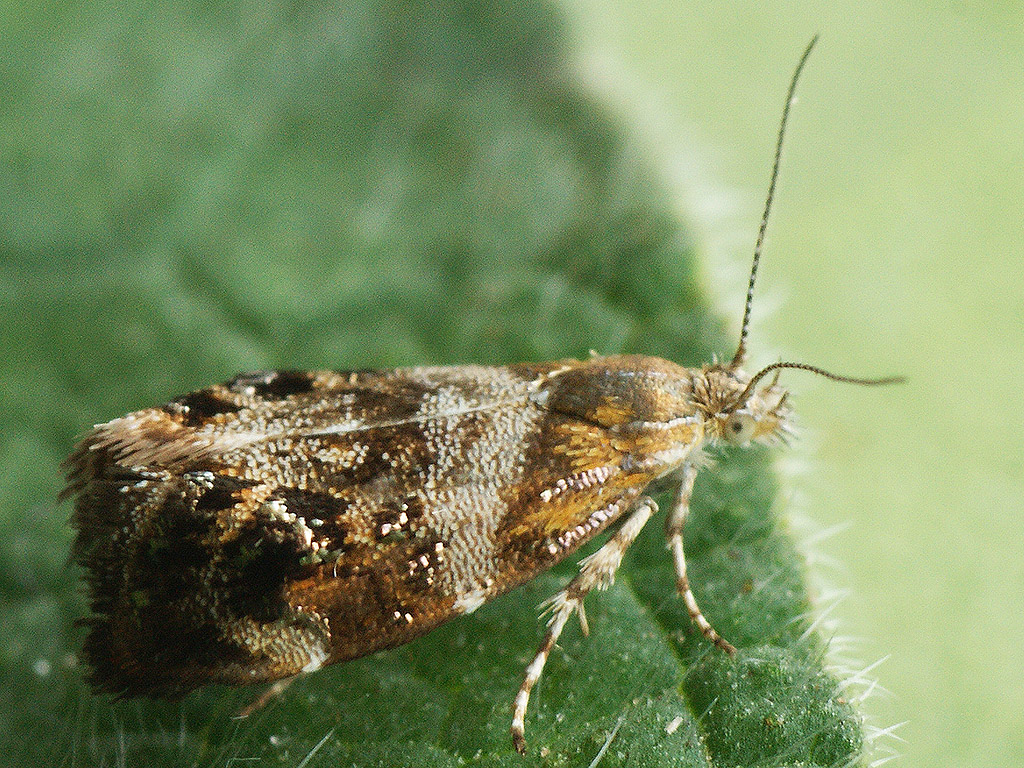

Scientific classification
- Domain: Eukaryota
- Kingdom: Animalia
- Phylum: Arthropoda
- Class: Insecta
- Order: Lepidoptera
- Family: Choreutidae
- Genus: Tebenna
- Species: T. bjerkandrella

Binomial name
- Tebenna bjerkandrella (Thunberg, 1784)

Synonyms
- Tinea bjerkandrella Thunberg, 1784; Choreutis bjerkandrella; Porpe bjerkandrella; Simaethis bjerkandrella; Phalaena Tortrix cardui Strøm, 1783 (suppressed); Choreutis cardui; Pyralis bjerkandrana Fabricius, 1787; Tortrix vibrana Hübner, [1813]; Cochylis vibrana; Choreutis vibralis; Xylopoda vibrana; Simaethis vibrana; Choreutis vibrana; Hemerophila vibrana; Phalaena bjerkandrana; Tinea prunnerella; Tebenna kawabei Arita, 1975; Tebenna caucasica Danilevsky, 1976

= Tebenna bjerkandrella =

Species of moth

Tebenna bjerkandrella is a moth of the family Choreutidae first described by Carl Peter Thunberg in 1784. It is found from Europe, Morocco, Madeira and the Canary Islands through central Asia to Japan. It has also been recorded from South Africa.

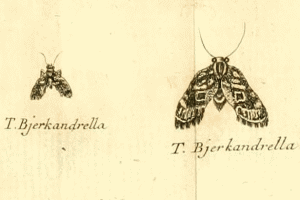
Illustration accompanying the original description

The wingspan is 11–14 mm.

The larvae feed on Inula salicina, Carduus, Carlina, Cirsium, Gnaphalium, Helichrysum species.

== Subspecies ==
- Tebenna bjerkandrella bjerkandrella
- Tebenna bjerkandrella caucasica (Danilevsky, 1976)
