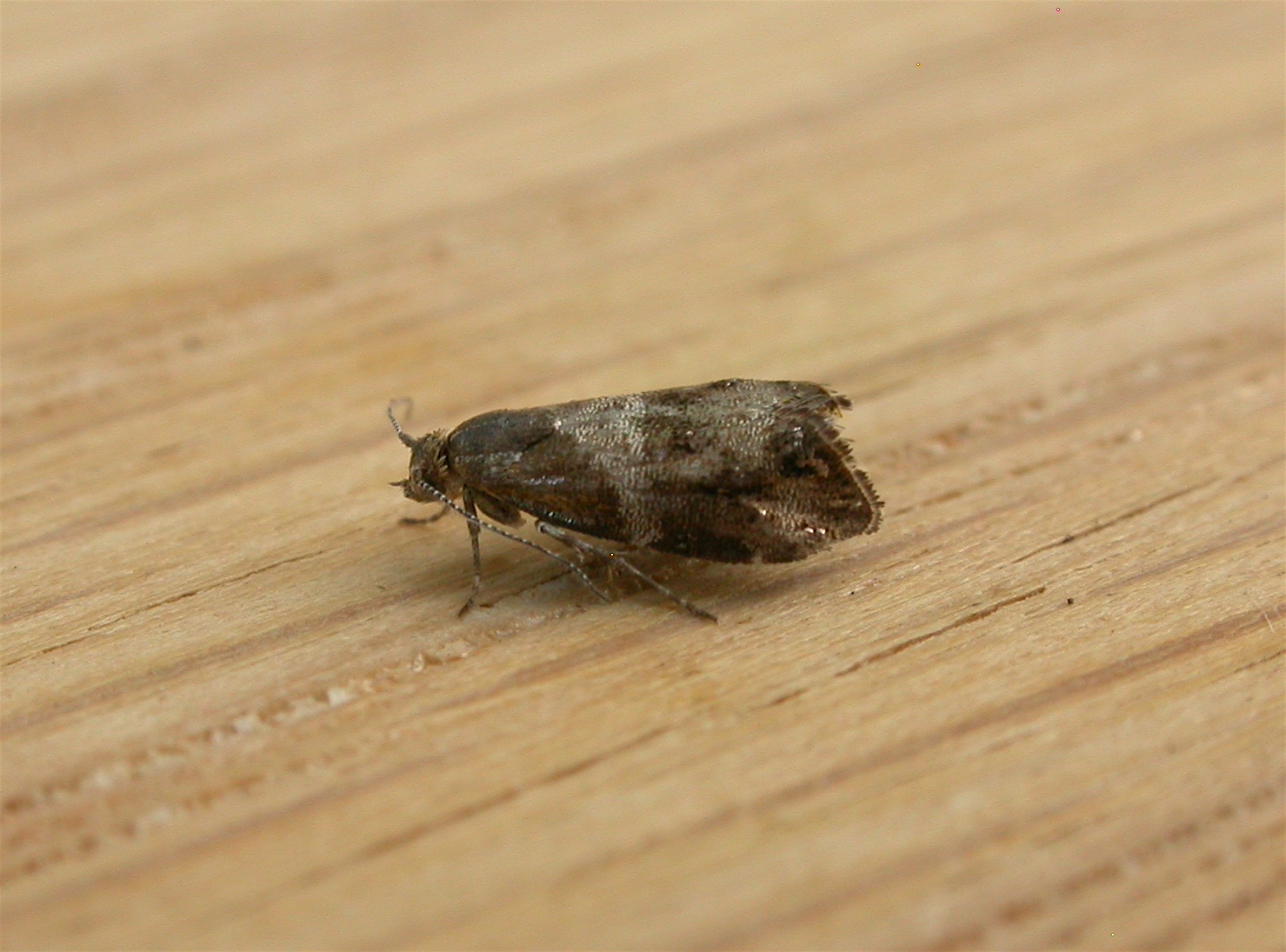
- Tebenna micalis

Scientific classification
- Domain: Eukaryota
- Kingdom: Animalia
- Phylum: Arthropoda
- Class: Insecta
- Order: Lepidoptera
- Family: Choreutidae
- Subfamily: Choreutinae
- Genus: Tebenna; Billberg, 1820

Synonyms
- Porpe Hübner, 1825

= Tebenna =

Genus of moths

Tebenna is a genus of moths in the family Choreutidae.

== Species ==
- Tebenna agalmatopa (Meyrick, 1926)
- Tebenna agelasta (Bradley, 1965)
- Tebenna alliciens (Meyrick, 1926)
- Tebenna balsamorrhizella Busck, 1904
- Tebenna bjerkandrella (Thunberg, 1784)
- (Tebenna bradleyi) Clarke, 1971 (mostly treated as a synonym of Tebenna micalis)
- Tebenna carduiella Kearfott, 1902
- (Tebenna caucasica) Danilevsky, 1976 (mostly treated as a subspecies of Tebenna bjerkandrella)
- Tebenna chingana Danilevsky, 1969
- Tebenna chodzhajevi (Gerasimov, 1930)
- Tebenna chrysotacta (Meyrick, 1933)
- Tebenna chrysoterma (Meyrick, 1932)
- Tebenna cornua Bippus, 2020
- Tebenna fuscidorsis (Zeller, 1877)
- Tebenna galapagoensis Heppner & Landry, 1994
- Tebenna gemmalis (Hulst, 1886)
- Tebenna gnaphaliella (Kearfott, 1902)
- Tebenna immutabilis (Braun, 1927)
- Tebenna inspirata (Meyrick, 1916)
- Tebenna lapidaria (Meyrick, 1909)
- Tebenna leptilonella (Busck, 1934)
- Tebenna micalis (Mann, 1857)
- Tebenna onustana (Walker, 1864)
- Tebenna piperella (Busck, 1904)
- Tebenna pretiosana (Duponchel, 1842)
- Tebenna pychnomochla (Bradley, 1965)
- Tebenna silphiella (Grote, 1881)
- Tebenna submicalis Danilevsky, 1969
- Tebenna yamashitai Arita, 1987
