= Tebenna agalmatopa =

Scientific classification
- Kingdom: Animalia
- Phylum: Arthropoda
- Class: Insecta
- Order: Lepidoptera
- Family: Choreutidae
- Genus: Tebenna
- Species: T. agalmatopa

Binomial name
- Tebenna agalmatopa (Meyrick, 1926)

Synonyms
- Choreutis agalmatopa Meyrick, 1926

Species of moth

Tebenna agalmatopa is a moth of the family Choreutidae. It is known from Sumatra.
