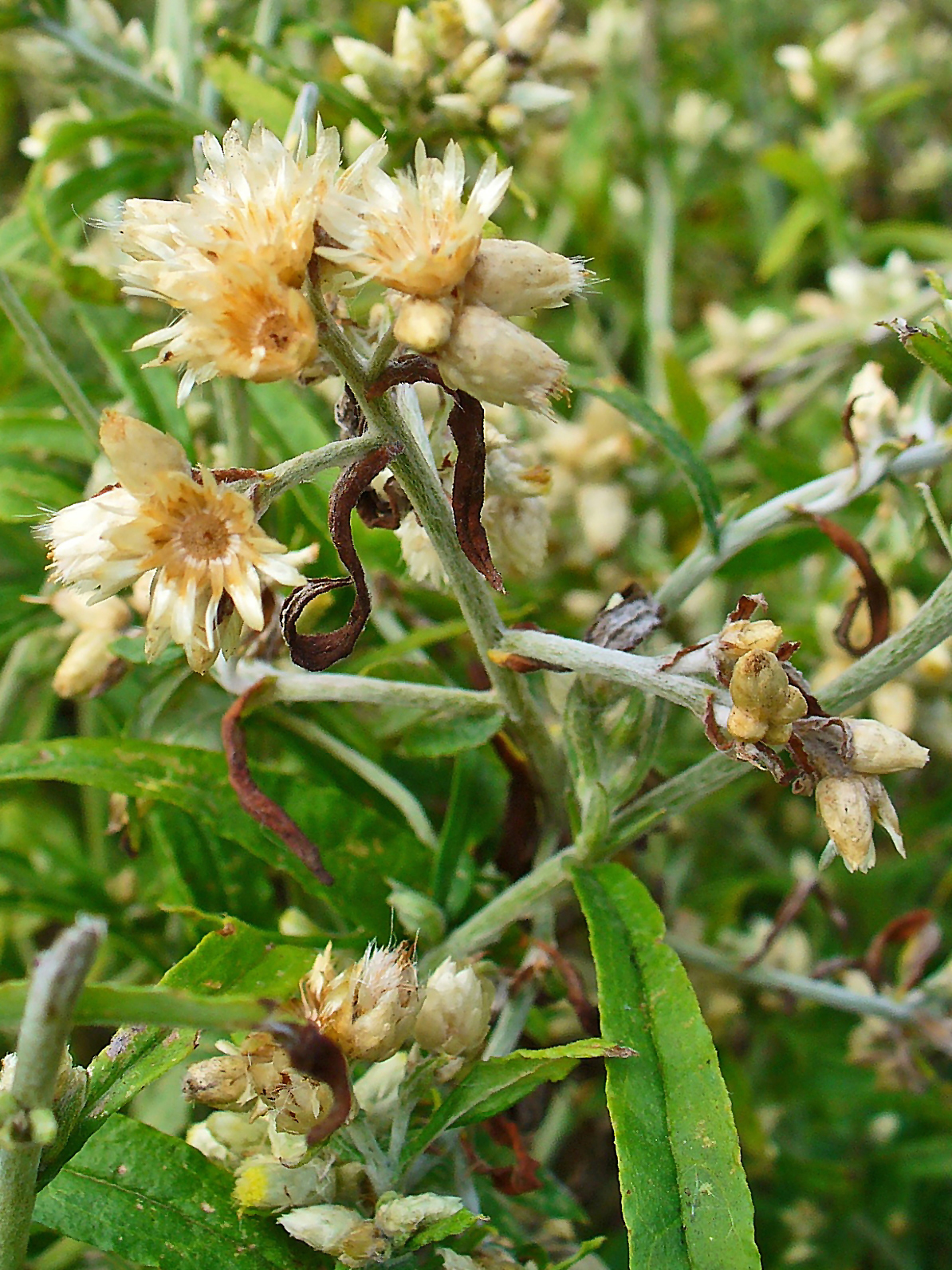

Conservation status
- Secure (NatureServe)

Scientific classification
- Kingdom: Plantae
- Clade: Tracheophytes
- Clade: Angiosperms
- Clade: Eudicots
- Clade: Asterids
- Order: Asterales
- Family: Asteraceae
- Genus: Pseudognaphalium
- Species: P. obtusifolium

Binomial name
- Pseudognaphalium obtusifolium (L.) Hilliard & B.L.Burtt

Synonyms
- Gnaphalium conoideum Lam.; Gnaphalium obtusifolium L.; Gnaphalium polycephalum Michx.; Gnaphalium saxicola Fassett; Pseudognaphalium obtusifolium subsp. praecox (Fernald) Kartesz, nom. nud.; Pseudognaphalium obtusifolium subsp. saxicola (Fassett) Kartesz; Pseudognaphalium saxicola (Fassett) H.E.Ballard & Feller

= Pseudognaphalium obtusifolium =

Species of plant

Pseudognaphalium obtusifolium, synonyms including Gnaphalium obtusifolium and Pseudognaphalium saxicola, is a member of the family Asteraceae. It is found on open dry sandy habitat throughout eastern North America. Common names include old field balsam, rabbit tobacco, sweet everlasting and life everlasting. When crushed, the plant exudes a characteristic maple-syrup scent.

== Description ==
It is a biennial herb which grows up to one meter tall. In its first year, the plant produces tightly packed rosettes covered in wooly hair. In the second year, the plant produces a tall stem with alternate leaves and yellow peg-shaped flowerheads. These are borne in clusters. The seeds are dispersed by the wind. Its native habitats include dry clearings, fields, and edges of woods.

== Taxonomy ==
Pseudognaphalium obtusifolium was first described by Carl Linnaeus in 1753 as Gnaphalium obtusifolium. It was transferred to Pseudognaphalium in 1981.

Populations found in the state of Wisconsin growing on ledges and in cracks in shaded limestone cliff-faces, usually those facing south or east, have been described as Pseudognaphalium saxicola, common name cliff cudweed or rabbit-tobacco. Pseudognaphalium saxicola is listed as Threatened in Wisconsin and is assessed as T2 (Imperiled) by NatureServe, but is regarded by other sources as a synonym of Pseudognaphalium obtusifolium.

== Ecology ==
Pseudognaphalium obtusifolium hosts larvae of the American Lady (Vanessa virginiensis) butterfly and its flowers are visited by short-tongued bees, wasps, and flies, while its foliage is eaten by wild turkey and deer. In the garden, it attracts butterflies and bees including specialized bees.

== Uses by Native Americans ==
=== Alabama tribe ===
The Alabama tribe used a compound decoction of it as a treatment for nervousness and sleepiness, and a decoction as a face wash for nerves and insomnia.

=== Cherokee ===
The Cherokee use it in a compound for muscle cramps, local pains, and twitching, and apply an infusion of it over scratches made over muscle cramp pain. It is also used internally with Carolina Vetch for rheumatism. A decoction is taken for colds, and the plant is also made into cough syrup. It is used in a sweat bath to treat various diseases, made into a warm liquid blown down throat for clogged throat (diphtheria), chewed for a sore mouth or throat, and smoked for asthma.

=== Choctaw ===
The Choctaw use a decoction of leaves and blossoms taken for lung pain and colds.

=== Creek ===
The Creek add the leaves to medicines as a perfume, use a decoction to treat vomiting, as a throat washes for mumps, as a wash "for people who wanted to run away" and as a wash for people who are believed to be afflicted by ghosts. A decoction made of the plant tops are used as a wash for old people who are unable to sleep. They also use a compound decoction of plant tops as an inhalant for colds, and apply a poultice of decoction of leaves for the throat for mumps.

=== Koasati ===
The Koasati take a decoction of the leaves for fevers, and use it to bathe those who are feverish.

=== Menominee ===
The Menominee steam the dried leaves as an inhalant for headaches, and as a treatment against "foolishness". They also smudge the leaves and use them to fumigate premises to dispel ghosts, and to bring back "loss of mind". This smudge is also used to revive unconscious patients. The leaf smoke is blown into the nostrils of people who have fainted.

=== Montagnais ===
The Montagnais use a decoction of the plant for coughing and tuberculosis.

=== Rappahannock ===
The Rappahannock Tribe take an infusion of the roots for chills, smoke dried leaves or dried stems in a pipe for asthma, and chew the leaves for "fun".
