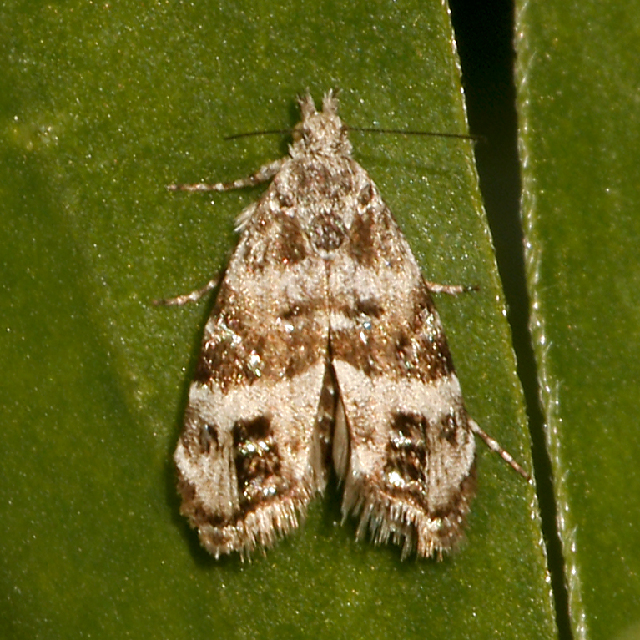

Scientific classification
- Domain: Eukaryota
- Kingdom: Animalia
- Phylum: Arthropoda
- Class: Insecta
- Order: Lepidoptera
- Family: Choreutidae
- Genus: Tebenna
- Species: T. piperella

Binomial name
- Tebenna piperella (Busck, 1904)

Synonyms
- Choreutis piperella Busck, 1904

= Tebenna piperella =

Species of moth

Tebenna piperella is a moth of the family Choreutidae. It is known from Canada, including British Columbia and Alberta.
