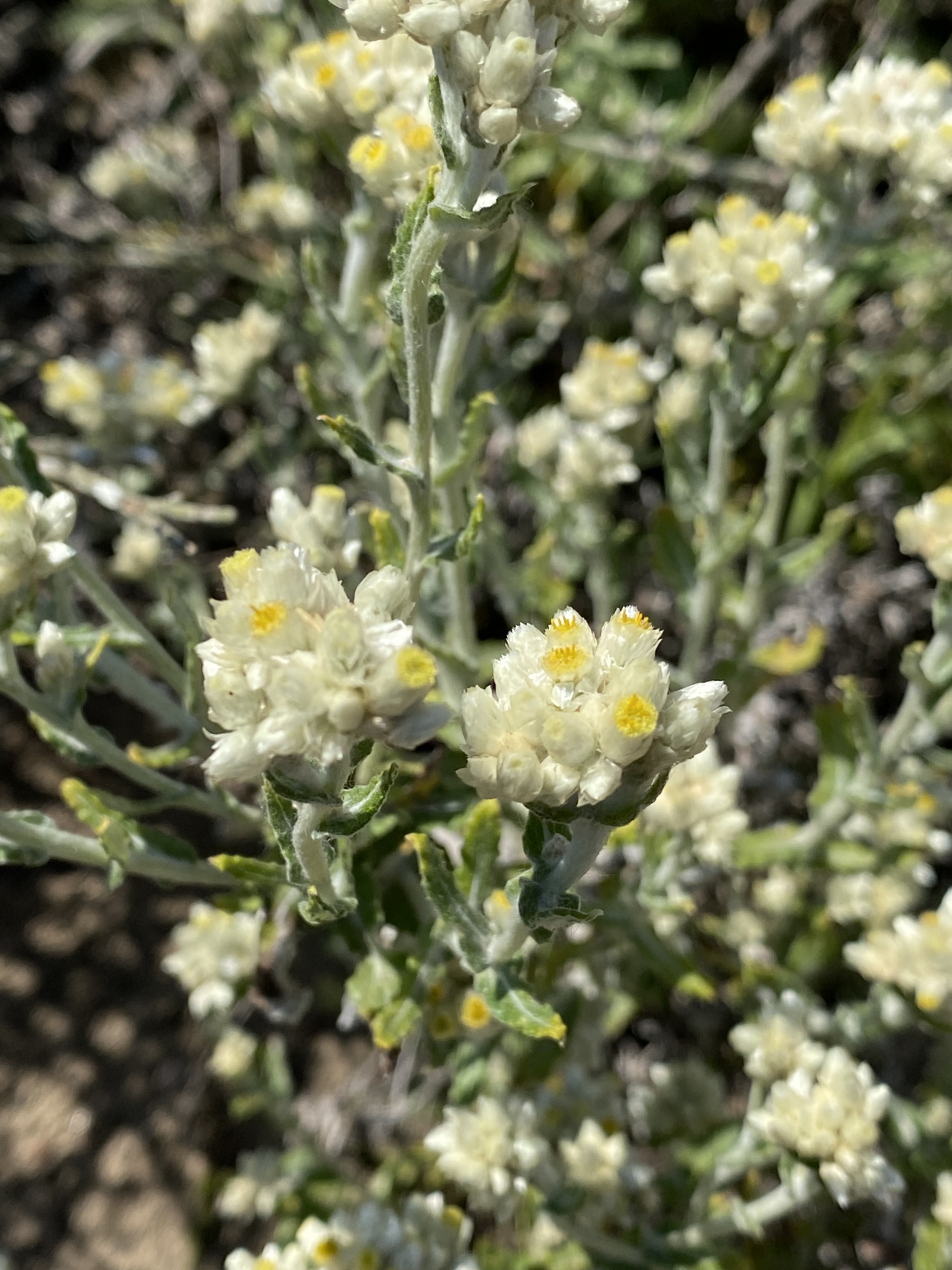

Scientific classification
- Kingdom: Plantae
- Clade: Tracheophytes
- Clade: Angiosperms
- Clade: Eudicots
- Clade: Asterids
- Order: Asterales
- Family: Asteraceae
- Genus: Pseudognaphalium
- Species: P. biolettii

Binomial name
- Pseudognaphalium biolettii Anderb. ex Nesom

= Pseudognaphalium biolettii =

Species of flowering plant

Pseudognaphalium biolettii, or two-color rabbit-tobacco, is an Asteraceae-family flowering plant found in western North America. An alternative common name is two-tone everlasting. This perennial species is a food plant for the larval/caterpillar stages of the American lady butterfly. This plant thrives in coastal sage and scrub habitats of southern California and Baja California. Two-color rabbit tobacco may have a slight fragrance of lemon. Plant size is up to a meter high. The blooming period is typically January to June.
