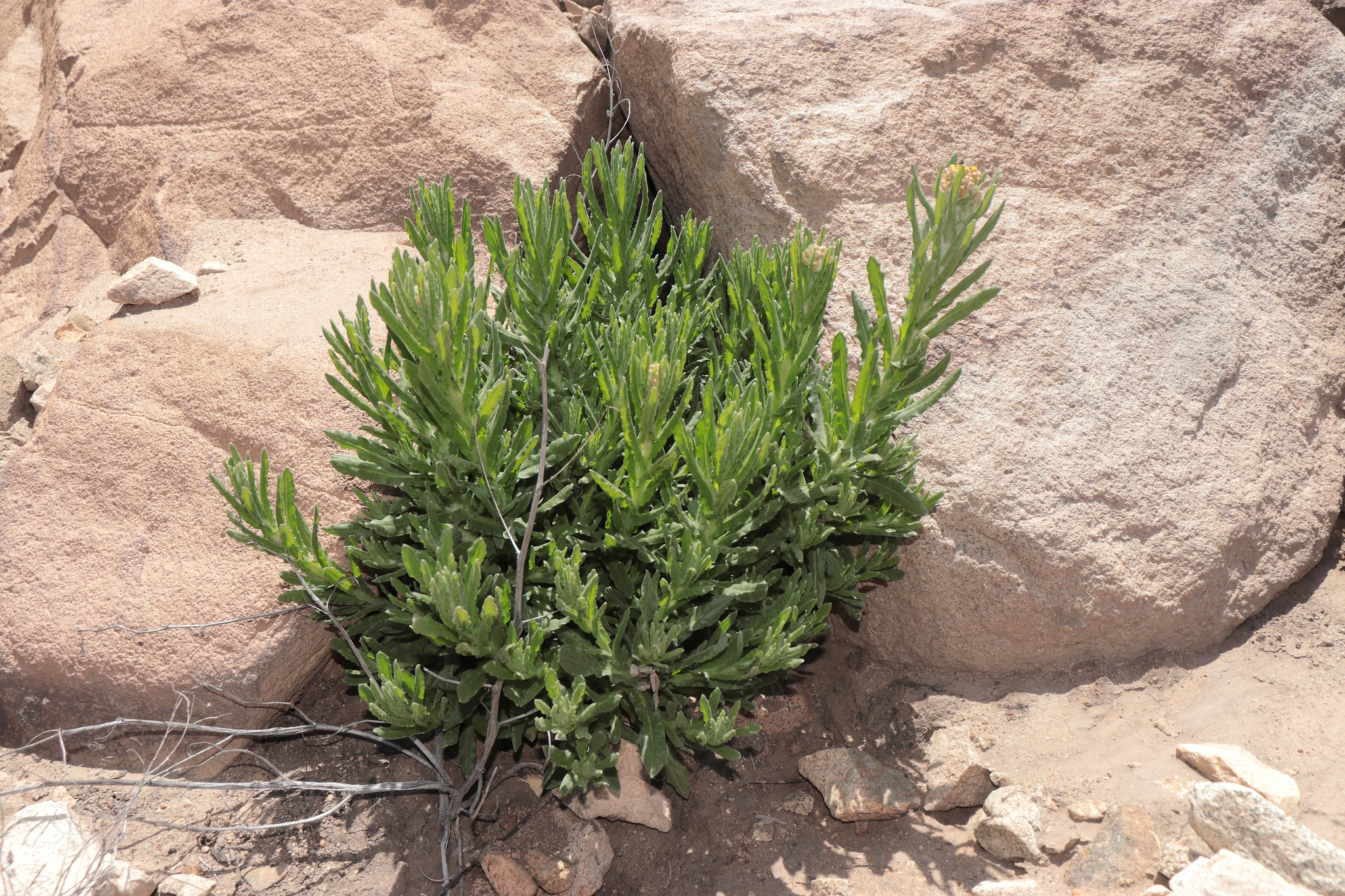

Scientific classification
- Kingdom: Plantae
- Clade: Tracheophytes
- Clade: Angiosperms
- Clade: Eudicots
- Clade: Asterids
- Order: Asterales
- Family: Asteraceae
- Genus: Pseudognaphalium
- Species: P. dysodes

Binomial name
- Pseudognaphalium dysodes (Spreng.) S.E.Freire, N.Bayón & C.Monti

Synonyms
- Gnaphalium cheiranthifolium var. graveolens Kuntze; Gnaphalium dombeyanum DC.; Gnaphalium dysodes Spreng.; Gnaphalium graveolens Kunth, nom. illeg.; Gnaphalium humillimum Spreng.; Gnaphalium nanum Kunth, nom. illeg.; Pseudognaphalium dombeyanum (DC.) Anderb.; Pseudognaphalium graveolens (Kuntze) Anderb.

= Pseudognaphalium dysodes =

Species of flowering plant

Pseudognaphalium dysodes, synonym Gnaphalium dysodes, is a species of flowering plant in the family Asteraceae. It is native to South America from northwestern Venezuela to northwestern Argentina.

== Conservation ==
Under the synonym Gnaphalium dysodes, the species was assessed as "near threatened" for the 2003 IUCN Red List, where it is said to be native only to Ecuador and threatened by habitat loss. As of April 2023, G. dysodes was regarded as one of the synonyms of Pseudognaphalium dysodes, which has a much wider distribution in South America.
