= Tebenna lapidaria =

Scientific classification
- Kingdom: Animalia
- Phylum: Arthropoda
- Class: Insecta
- Order: Lepidoptera
- Family: Choreutidae
- Genus: Tebenna
- Species: T. lapidaria

Binomial name
- Tebenna lapidaria (Meyrick, 1909)

Synonyms
- Choreutis lapidaria Meyrick, 1909

Species of moth

Tebenna lapidaria is a moth in the family Choreutidae. It was described by Edward Meyrick in 1909. It is found in Bolivia.
