= Tebenna pychnomochla =

Scientific classification
- Kingdom: Animalia
- Phylum: Arthropoda
- Class: Insecta
- Order: Lepidoptera
- Family: Choreutidae
- Genus: Tebenna
- Species: T. pychnomochla

Binomial name
- Tebenna pychnomochla (Bradley, 1965)

Synonyms
- Choreutis pychnomochla Bradley, 1965

Species of moth

Tebenna pychnomochla is a species of moth of the family Choreutidae. It is found in Uganda.
