= Tebenna inspirata =

Scientific classification
- Kingdom: Animalia
- Phylum: Arthropoda
- Class: Insecta
- Order: Lepidoptera
- Family: Choreutidae
- Genus: Tebenna
- Species: T. inspirata

Binomial name
- Tebenna inspirata (Meyrick, 1916)

Synonyms
- Choreutis inspirata Meyrick, 1916

Species of moth

Tebenna inspirata is a species of moth of the family Choreutidae. It is found in Nigeria.

The species was first described by Edward Meyrick in 1916.
