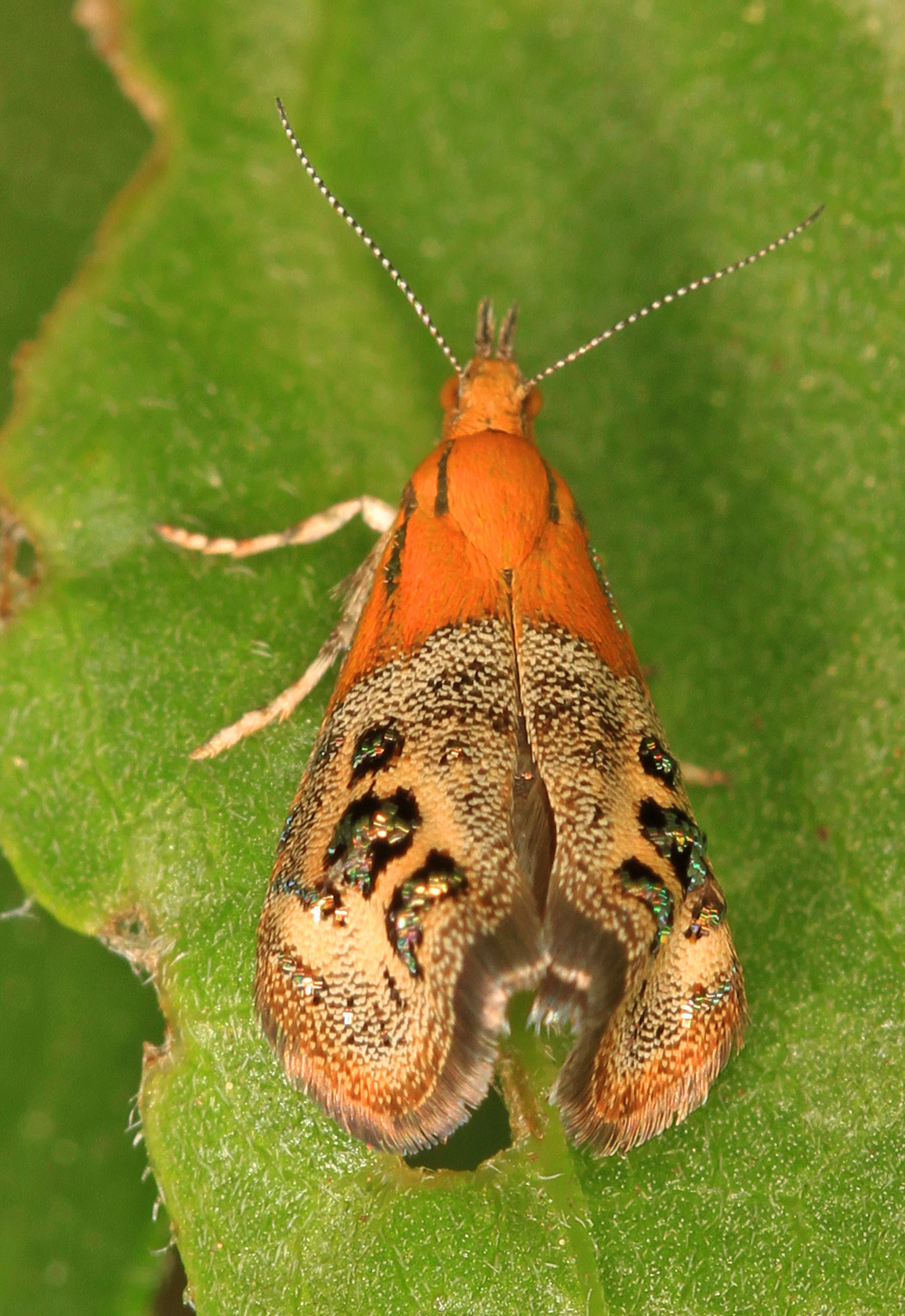

Scientific classification
- Domain: Eukaryota
- Kingdom: Animalia
- Phylum: Arthropoda
- Class: Insecta
- Order: Lepidoptera
- Family: Choreutidae
- Genus: Tebenna
- Species: T. gemmalis

Binomial name
- Tebenna gemmalis (Hulst, 1886)

Synonyms
- Chalcoela gemmalis Hulst, 1886

= Tebenna gemmalis =

Species of moth

Tebenna gemmalis is a moth of the family Choreutidae. It is found in North America from California to British Columbia.

Adults are on wing from April to July in California.
