= Montagnais (disambiguation) =

The Montagnais, or Innu, are a First Nation in Canada.

Montagnais (meaning mountaineers in French) may also refer to:

- Montagnais of Natashquan, an Innu First Nation band government in Quebec
- Old Montagnais, the period in the history of the Innu language preceding its current form
- Montagnais language
- Chipewyan people, a Dene Indigenous Canadian people
- Montagnais crater, a crater off the coast of Nova Scotia
- Poste Montagnais, Quebec, an electrical substation in Quebec, on the transmission lines connecting to the Churchill Falls Generating Station
- Poste Montagnais Airport, an airport at the electrical substation in Quebec

== See also ==
- Montagnard (disambiguation), another French term with the same meaning
