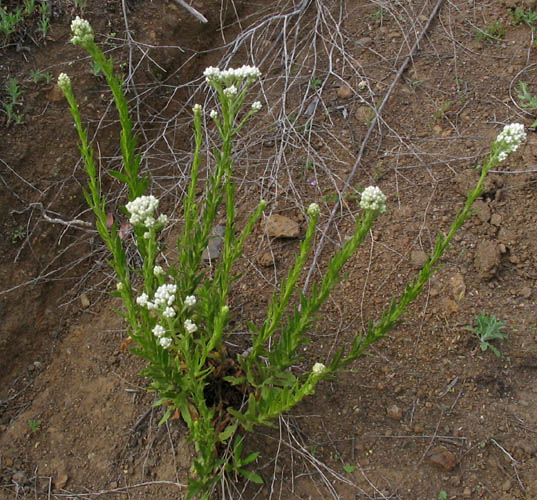
- Pseudognaphalium californicum

Scientific classification
- Kingdom: Plantae
- Clade: Tracheophytes
- Clade: Angiosperms
- Clade: Eudicots
- Clade: Asterids
- Order: Asterales
- Family: Asteraceae
- Subfamily: Asteroideae
- Tribe: Gnaphalieae
- Genus: Pseudognaphalium; Kirp.

Synonyms
- Gnaphalion St.-Lag.; Hypelichrysum Kirp.; Gnaphalium sect. Calolepis Kirp.

= Pseudognaphalium =

Genus of plants

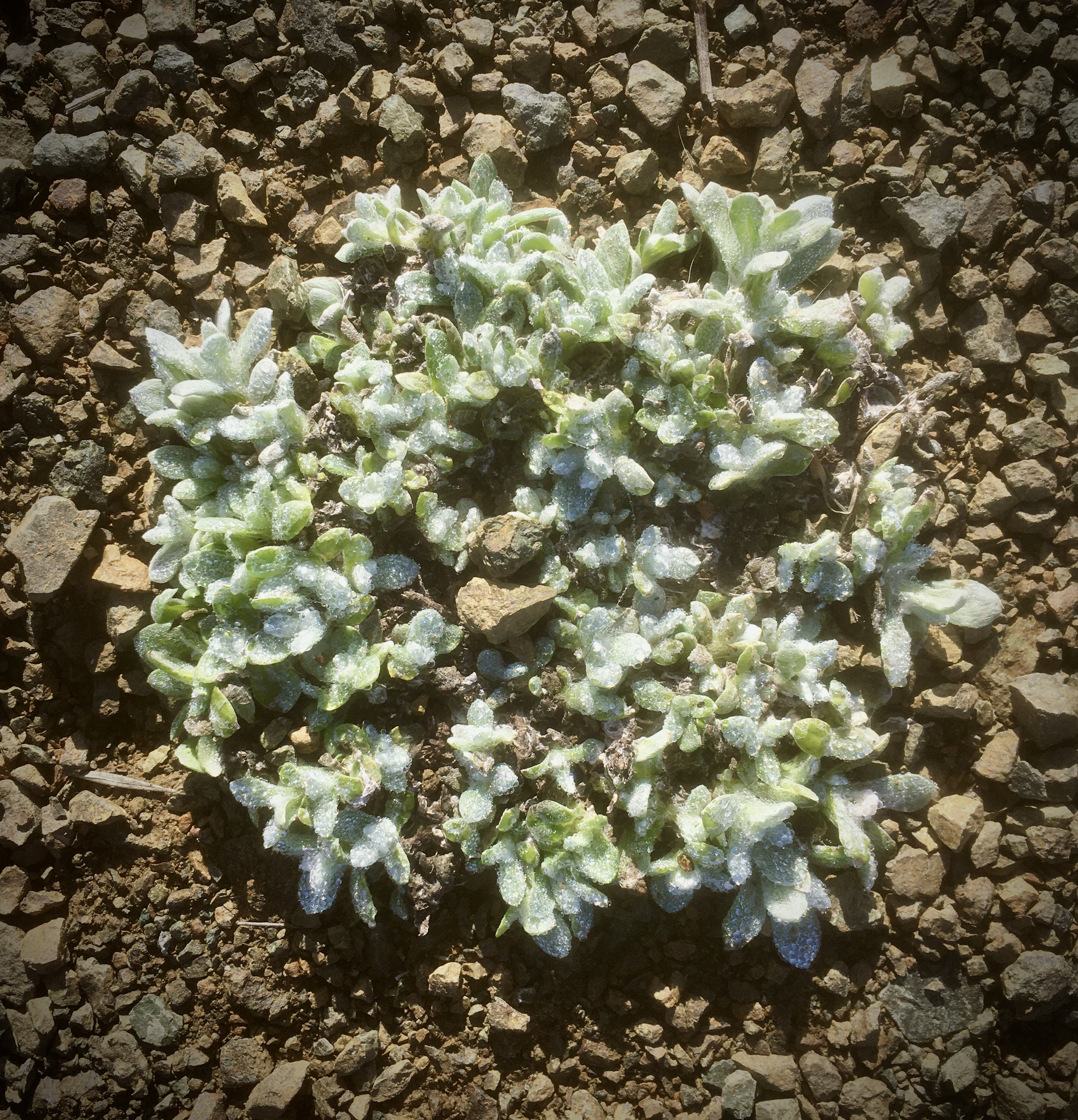
Pseudognaphalium stramineum, cottonbatting plant. North coast of San Luis Obispo County, California

Pseudognaphalium is a genus of flowering plants in the family Asteraceae. Members of the genus are commonly known as cudweeds or rabbit tobacco (P. obtusifolium is the original species with that name). They are widespread in tropical and temperate regions of many countries.

Species have been moved between Pseudognaphalium and the related genus Gnaphalium.

== Species ==
As of April 2023, Plants of the World Online accepted the following species:

- Pseudognaphalium acutiusculum (Urb. & Ekman) Anderb.
- Pseudognaphalium adnatum (DC.) Y.S.Chen
- Pseudognaphalium affine (D.Don) Anderb.
- Pseudognaphalium alatocaule (Nash) Anderb.
- Pseudognaphalium albescens (Sw.) Anderb.
- Pseudognaphalium aldunateoides (J.Rémy) C.Monti, N.Bayón & S.E.Freire
- Pseudognaphalium altimiranum (Greenm.) Anderb.
- Pseudognaphalium andicola (Phil.) C.Monti, N.Bayón & S.E.Freire
- Pseudognaphalium arizonicum (A.Gray) Anderb. – Arizona cudweed
- Pseudognaphalium attenuatum (DC.) Anderb. – tapered cudweed
- Pseudognaphalium austrotexanum G.L.Nesom
- Pseudognaphalium badium (Wedd.) Anderb.
- Pseudognaphalium beneolens (Davidson) Anderb. – Wright's cudweed
- Pseudognaphalium biolettii Anderb. ex Nesom – two-color rabbit-tobacco
- Pseudognaphalium bourgovii (A.Gray) Anderb.
- Pseudognaphalium brachyphyllum (Greenm.) Anderb.
- Pseudognaphalium brachypterum (DC.) Anderb.
- Pseudognaphalium caeruleocanum (Steyerm.) Anderb.
- Pseudognaphalium californicum (DC.) Anderb. – ladies' tobacco
- Pseudognaphalium canescens (DC.) Anderb. – Wright's cudweed
- Pseudognaphalium chartaceum (Greenm.) Anderb.
- Pseudognaphalium cheiranthifolium (Lam.) Hilliard & B.L.Burtt
- Pseudognaphalium chrysocephalum (Franch.) Hilliard & B.L.Burtt
- Pseudognaphalium conoideum (Kunth) Anderb.
- Pseudognaphalium coquimbense (Phil.) Anderb.
- Pseudognaphalium cymatoides (DC.) Anderb.
- Pseudognaphalium dichotomum V.M.Badillo
- Pseudognaphalium domingense (Lam.) Anderb. – Dominican cudweed
- Pseudognaphalium dysodes (Spreng.) S.E.Freire, N.Bayón & C.Monti
- Pseudognaphalium eggersii (Urb.) Anderb.
- Pseudognaphalium ehrenbergianum G.L.Nesom
- Pseudognaphalium elegans Kartesz – royal cudweed
- Pseudognaphalium ephemerum de Lange
- Pseudognaphalium flavescens (Kitam.) Anderb.
- Pseudognaphalium gaudichaudianum (DC.) Anderb.
- Pseudognaphalium gayanum (J.Rémy) Anderb.
- Pseudognaphalium glanduliferum C.Monti, N.Bayón & S.E.Freire
- Pseudognaphalium glandulosum (Klatt) Anderb.
- Pseudognaphalium greenmanii (S.F.Blake) Anderb.
- Pseudognaphalium helleri (Britton) Anderb. – Heller's cudweed
- Pseudognaphalium heterotrichum (Phil.) Anderb.
- Pseudognaphalium hintoniorum (G.L.Nesom) Hinojosa & Villaseñor
- Pseudognaphalium hypoleucum (DC.) Hilliard & B.L.Burtt
- Pseudognaphalium illapelinum (Phil.) Anderb.
- Pseudognaphalium inornatum (DC.) Anderb.
- Pseudognaphalium jaliscense (Greenm.) Anderb. – Jalisco rabbit-tobacco
- Pseudognaphalium jujuyense (Cabrera) Anderb.
- Pseudognaphalium lacteum (Meyen & Walp.) Anderb.
- Pseudognaphalium landbeckii (Phil.) Anderb.
- Pseudognaphalium lanuginosum (Kunth) Anderb.
- Pseudognaphalium leucocephalum (A.Gray) Anderb. – white cudweed
- Pseudognaphalium leucopeplum (Cabrera) Anderb.
- Pseudognaphalium leucostegium Pruski
- Pseudognaphalium liebmannii (Sch.Bip. ex Klatt) Anderb.
- Pseudognaphalium luteoalbum (L.) Hilliard & B.L.Burtt
- Pseudognaphalium macounii (Greene) Kartesz– Macoun's cudweed
- Pseudognaphalium marranum (Philipson) Hilliard
- Pseudognaphalium melanosphaerum (Sch.Bip. ex A.Rich.) Hilliard
- Pseudognaphalium meridanum (Aristeg.) Anderb.
- Pseudognaphalium micradenium (Weath.) G.L.Nesom
- Pseudognaphalium microcephalum (Nutt.) Anderb. – Wright's cudweed
- Pseudognaphalium moelleri (Phil.) Anderb.
- Pseudognaphalium montevidense (Spreng.) Anderb.
- Pseudognaphalium monticola (McVaugh) Villarreal, A.E.Estrada & Encina
- Pseudognaphalium moritzianum (Klatt) V.M.Badillo
- Pseudognaphalium munoziae N.Bayón, C.Monti & S.E.Freire
- Pseudognaphalium nataliae (F.J.Espinosa) Villarreal, A.E.Estrada & Encina
- Pseudognaphalium nubicola (I.M.Johnst.) Anderb.
- Pseudognaphalium oaxacanum G.L.Nesom
- Pseudognaphalium obtusifolium (L.) Hilliard & B.L.Burtt (including Pseudognaphalium saxicola) – rabbit-tobacco
- Pseudognaphalium oligandrum (DC.) Hilliard & B.L.Burtt
- Pseudognaphalium oxyphyllum (DC.) Kirp.
- Pseudognaphalium paramorum (S.F.Blake) M.O.Dillon
- Pseudognaphalium perpusillum (Phil.) C.Monti, N.Bayón & S.E.Freire
- Pseudognaphalium petitianum (A.Rich.) Mesfin
- Pseudognaphalium pratense (Phil.) Anderb. – Pringle's cudweed
- Pseudognaphalium pringlei (A.Gray) Anderb.
- Pseudognaphalium psilophyllum (Meyen & Walp.) Anderb.
- Pseudognaphalium purpurascens (DC.) Anderb.
- Pseudognaphalium ramosissimum (Nutt.) Anderb. – pink cudweed
- Pseudognaphalium remyanum (Phil.) Anderb.
- Pseudognaphalium rhodarum (S.F.Blake) Anderb.
- Pseudognaphalium richardianum (Cufod.) Hilliard & B.L.Burtt
- Pseudognaphalium robustum (Phil.) Anderb.
- Pseudognaphalium roseum (Kunth) Anderb. – rosy cudweed
- Pseudognaphalium rosillense (Urb.) Anderb.
- Pseudognaphalium sandwicensium (Gaudich.) Anderb. – ʻenaʻena
- Pseudognaphalium schraderi (DC.) Anderb.
- Pseudognaphalium selleanum (Urb. & Ekman) Anderb.
- Pseudognaphalium semiamplexicaule (DC.) Anderb.
- Pseudognaphalium semilanatum (DC.) Anderb.
- Pseudognaphalium stolonatum (S.F.Blake) M.O.Dillon
- Pseudognaphalium stramineum (Kunth) Anderb. – cottonbatting plant
- Pseudognaphalium subsericeum (S.F.Blake) Anderb.
- Pseudognaphalium sylvicola G.L.Nesom
- Pseudognaphalium tarapacanum (Phil.) Anderb.
- Pseudognaphalium thermale (E.E.Nelson) G.L.Nesom
- Pseudognaphalium tortuanum (Urb.) Anderb.
- Pseudognaphalium undulatum (L.) Hilliard & B.L.Burtt
- Pseudognaphalium versatile (Rusby) Anderb.
- Pseudognaphalium viravira (Molina) Anderb.
- Pseudognaphalium viscosum (Kunth) Anderb. – winged cudweed
- Pseudognaphalium yalaense (Cabrera) Anderb.
