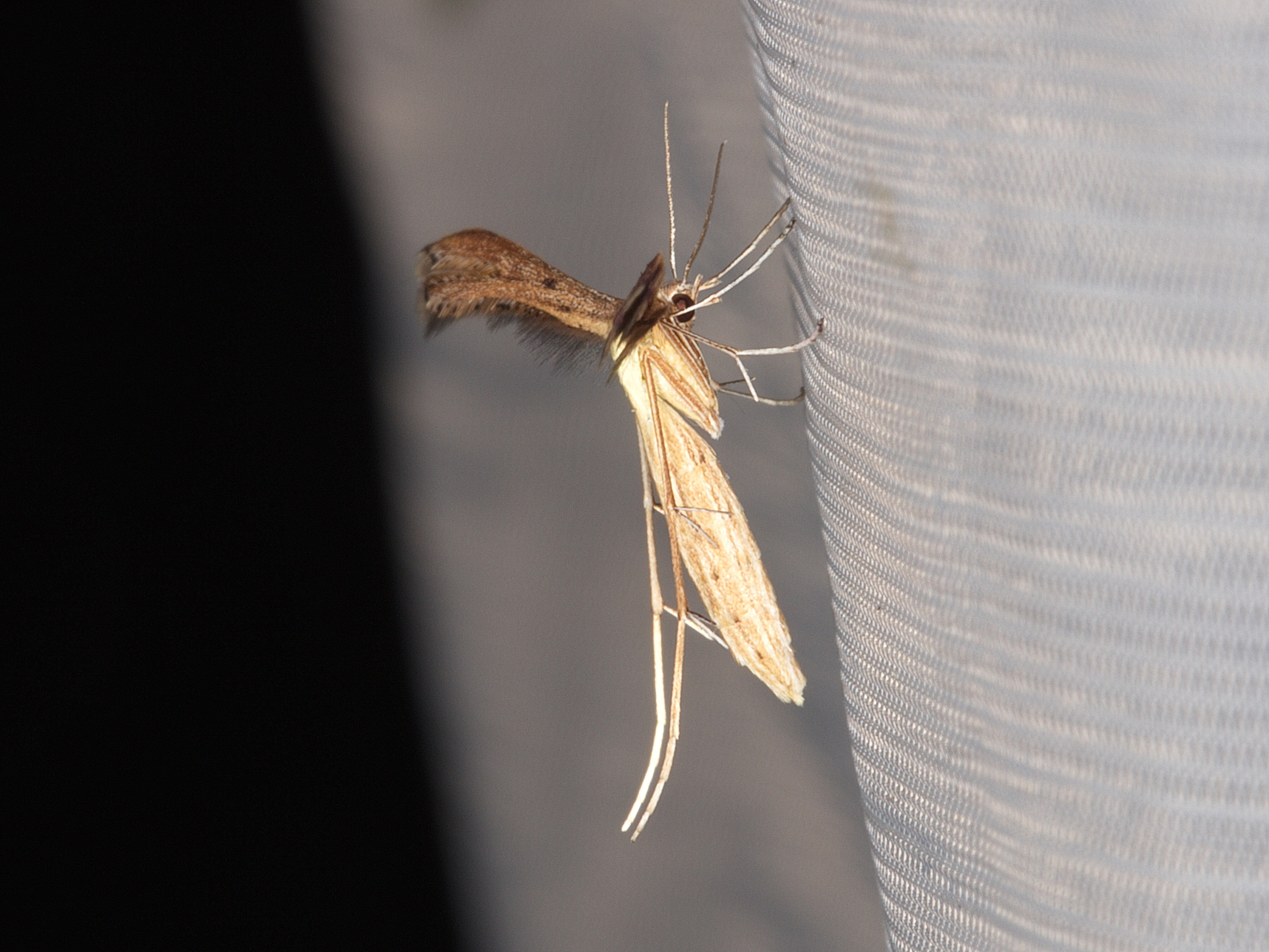
- Exelastis pumilio

Scientific classification
- Kingdom: Animalia
- Phylum: Arthropoda
- Clade: Pancrustacea
- Class: Insecta
- Order: Lepidoptera
- Family: Pterophoridae
- Subfamily: Pterophorinae; Zeller, 1841

Genera
- See text

= Pterophorinae =

Subfamily of moths

Pterophorinae is a subfamily of moths in the family Pterophoridae.

== Tribes and genera ==
As of version 1.1.23.125, the Catalogue of the Pterophoroidea of the World lists the following tribes and genera for subfamily Pterophorinae:

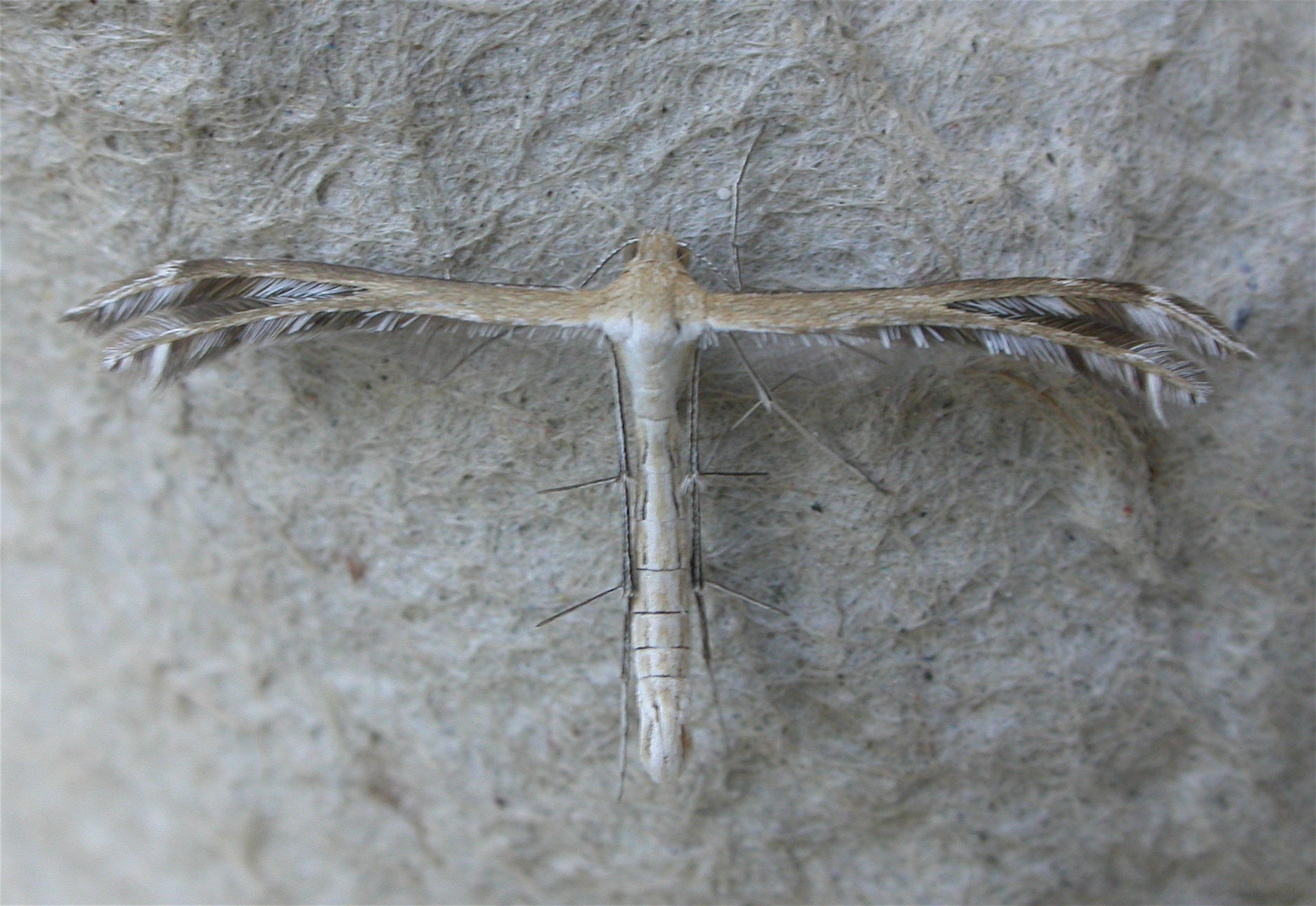
Stangeia xerodes (Pterophorinae: Oxyptilini)

- Tribe Marasmarchini Tutt, 1906 (Exelastini Gielis, 2000)
  - Genus Arcoptilia Arenberger, 1985
  - Genus Exelastis Meyrick, 1908
  - Genus Fuscoptilia Arenberger, 1991
  - Genus Marasmarcha Meyrick, 1886
  - Genus Parafuscoptilia Hao & Li, 2005
- Tribe Oidaematophorini Bigot, Gibeaux, Nel & Picard, 1998
  - Genus Adaina Tutt, 1905
  - Genus Crassuncus Gibeaux, 1994
  - Genus Emmelina Tutt, 1905
  - Genus Gypsochares Meyrick, 1890
  - Genus Hellinsia Tutt, 1905
  - Genus Helpaphorus Gibeaux, 1994
  - Genus Oidaematophorus Wallengren, 1862
  - Genus Picardia Gibeaux, 1994
  - Genus Pselnophorus Wallengren, 1881
  - Genus Puerphorus Arenberger, 1990
  - Genus Setosipennula Gibeaux, 1994
- Tribe Oxyptilini Bigot, Gibeaux, Nel & Picard, 1998
  - Genus Apoxyptilus Alipanah, Sari, Sarafrat, Gielis & Manzari, 2010
  - Genus Buckleria Tutt, 1905
  - Genus Capperia Tutt, 1905
  - Genus Crombrugghia Tutt, 1906
  - Genus Dejongia Gielis, 1993
  - Genus Eucapperia Gibeaux, 1994
  - Genus Geina Tutt, 1906
  - Genus Intercapperia Arenberger, 1988
  - Genus Megalorhipida Amsel, 1935
  - Genus Oxyptilus Zeller, 1841
  - Genus Paracapperia Bigot & Picard, 1986
  - Genus Prichotilus Rose and Pooni, 2005
  - Genus Procapperia Adamczewski, 1951
  - Genus Pseudoxyptilus Alipanah, Sari, Sarafrat, Gielis & Manzari, 2010
  - Genus Sphenarches Meyrick, 1886
  - Genus Stangeia Tutt, 1905
  - Genus Stenodacma Amsel, 1959
  - Genus Tomotilus Yano, 1961
  - Genus Trichoptilus Walsingham, 1880
- Tribe Platyptiliini Bigot, Gibeaux, Nel & Picard, 1998
  - Genus Amblyptilia Hübner, [1825]
  - Genus Anstenoptilia Zimmerman, 1958
  - Genus Asiaephorus Gielis, 2000
  - Genus Bigotilia Gibeaux, 1994
  - Genus Bipunctiphorus Gibeaux, 1994
  - Genus Buszkoiana Koçak, 1981
  - Genus Cnaemidophorus Wallengren, 1862
  - Genus Crocydoscelus Walsingham, 1897
  - Genus Fletcherella Diakonoff, 1952
  - Genus Gillmeria Tutt, 1905
  - Genus Inferuncus Gibeaux, 1994
  - Genus Koremaguia Hampson, 1891
  - Genus Lantanophaga Zimmermann, 1958
  - Genus Leesi Gibeaux, 1996
  - Genus Lioptilodes Zimmerman, 1958
  - Genus Melanoptilia Gielis, 2006
  - Genus Michaelophorus Gielis, 1999
  - Genus Nippoptilia Matsumura, 1931
  - Genus Paraamblyptilia Gielis, 1991
  - Genus Paraplatyptilia Bigot & Picard, 1986
  - Genus Platyptilia Hübner, [1825]
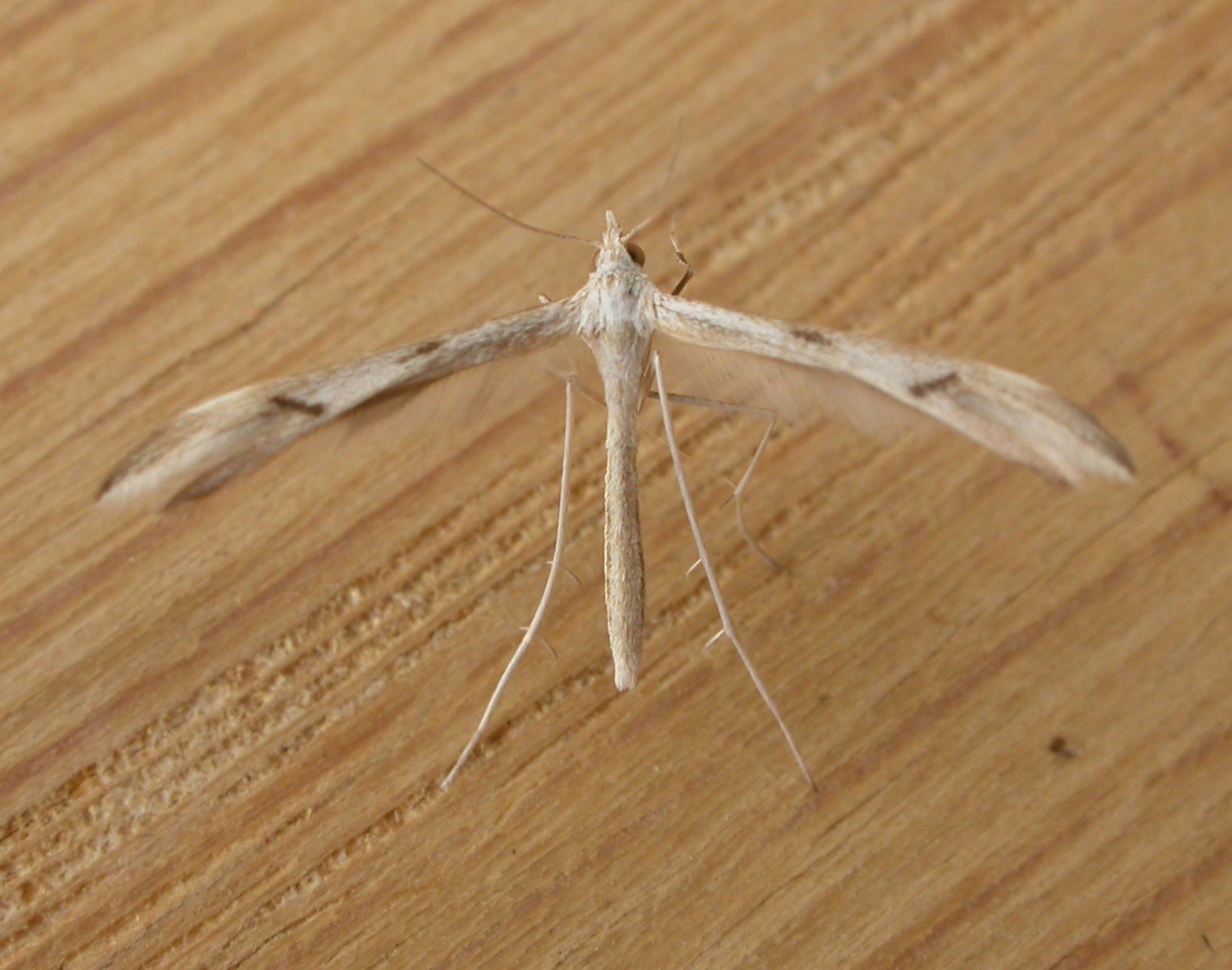
    Platyptilia celidotus (Pterophorinae: Platyptilini)
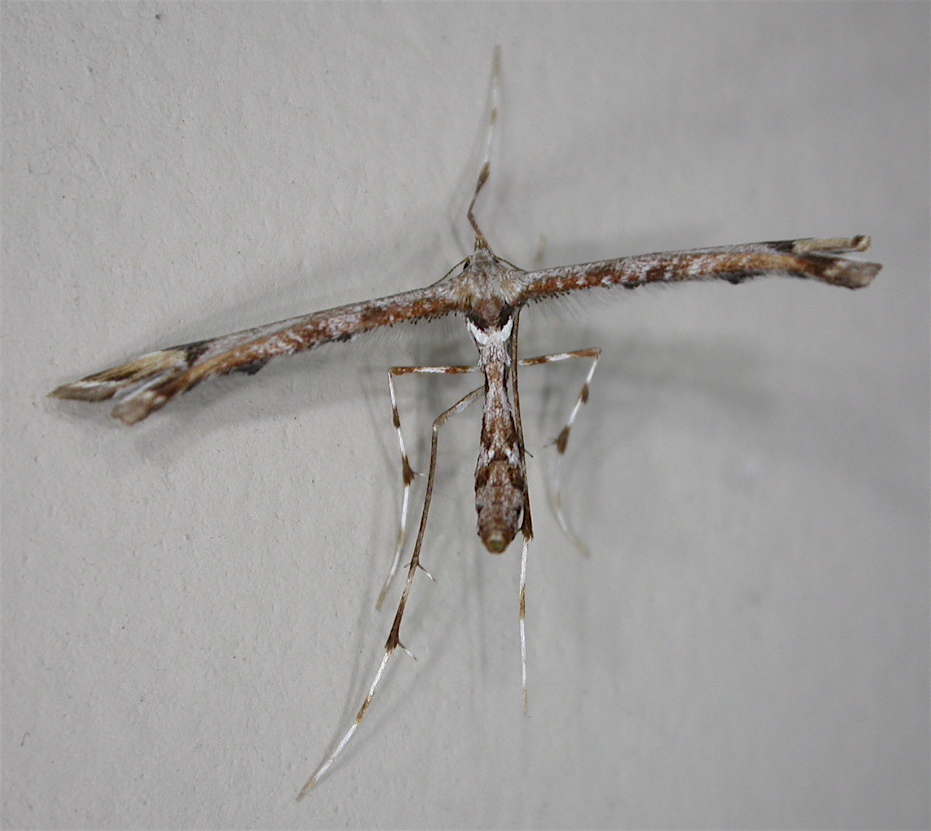
    Platyptilia falcatalis (Pterophorinae: Platyptilini)

Bucks Plume avoids a crab spider

  - Genus Platyptiliodes Strand, 1913
  - Genus Postplatyptilia Gielis, 1991
  - Genus Quadriptilia Gielis, 1994
  - Genus Sinpunctiptilia Arenberger, 2006
  - Genus Sochchora Walker, 1864
  - Genus Stenoptilia Hübner, [1825]
  - Genus Stenoptilodes Zimmermann, 1958
  - Genus Stockophorus Gielis, 1993
  - Genus Uroloba Walsingham, 1891
  - Genus Vietteilus Gibeaux, 1994
  - Genus Xyroptila Meyrick, 1908
- Tribe Pterophorini Bigot, Gibeaux, Nel & Picard, 1998
  - Genus Calyciphora Kasy, 1960
  - Genus Cosmoclostis Meyrick, 1886
  - Genus Diacrotricha Zeller, 1852
  - Genus Imbophorus Arenberger, 1991
  - Genus Merrifieldia Tutt, 1905
  - Genus Oirata Ustjuzhanin & Kovtunovich, 2002
  - Genus Patagonophorus Gielis, 1991
  - Genus Porrittia Tutt, 1905
  - Genus Pterophorus Schäffer, 1766
  - Genus Septuaginta Ustjuzhanin, 1996
  - Genus Singularia Arenberger, 1988
  - Genus Tabulaephorus Arenberger, 1993
  - Genus Wheeleria Tutt, 1905
- Tribe Tetraschalini Gielis, 2000
  - Genus Tetraschalis Meyrick, 1887
  - Genus Titanoptilus Hampson, 1905
  - Genus Walsinghamiella Berg, 1898
