= Fletcherella =

Scientific classification
- Kingdom: Animalia
- Phylum: Arthropoda
- Class: Insecta
- Order: Lepidoptera
- Family: Pterophoridae
- Subfamily: Pterophorinae
- Tribe: Platyptiliini
- Genus: Fletcherella; Diakonoff, 1952

Genus of moths

Fletcherella is a genus of moths in the family Pterophoridae. The Fletcherella genus belongs to the subfamily Pterophorinae and the tribe Platyptiliini. The genus was first named in New Guinea by Alexey Diakonoff in 1952, though Edward Meyrick discovered Fletcherella niphadarcha in 1930.

Originally conflated with other moths in the genera Sochchora, Walsinghamiella (previously misapplied as Gilbertia), and Crocydoscelus, Fletcherella were distinguished by their longer, slimmer palpi. Significant differences in the shape and neuration of hind wings further separated the previously synonymous genus.

== Etymology ==
Diakonoff dedicated this genus to Thomas Bainbrigge Fletcher, hence Fletcherella.

== Distribution ==
Moths in this genus have been identified in Cameroon, Côte d'Ivoire, the Democratic Republic of Congo, Uganda, Indonesia, and the Philippines.

== Species ==
- Fletcherella niphadarcha (Meyrick, 1930)
- Fletcherella niphadothysana (Diakonoff, 1952)
