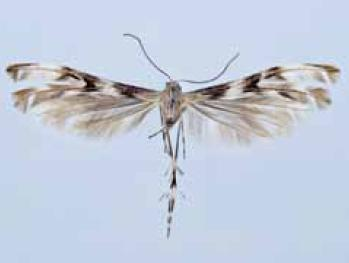

Scientific classification
- Kingdom: Animalia
- Phylum: Arthropoda
- Class: Insecta
- Order: Lepidoptera
- Family: Pterophoridae
- Genus: Chocophorus
- Species: C. carabayus

Binomial name
- Chocophorus carabayus (Arenberger, 1990)

Synonyms
- Pterophorus carabayus Arenberger, 1990

= Chocophorus carabayus =

Species of moth

Chocophorus carabayus is a moth of the family Pterophoridae. It is found in Argentina, Ecuador and Peru.

The wingspan is 15–19 mm. Adults have been recorded in January, March, July, September and October.
