= Antarches =

Scientific classification
- Kingdom: Animalia
- Phylum: Arthropoda
- Clade: Pancrustacea
- Class: Insecta
- Order: Lepidoptera
- Family: Pterophoridae
- Subfamily: Pterophorinae
- Tribe: Oxyptilini
- Genus: Antarches; Gibeaux, 1994

Plume moth genus

Antarches is a genus of moth in the family Pterophoridae described for Antarches luqueti Gibeaux, 1994 from Madagascar.

Authors have previously treated this genus as a synonym for Megalorhipida based on the appearance of the adult insect and its genitalia, but fuller morphological data indicates that Antarches should remain separate.

Currently, only a single species is assigned to the genus, following recognition in 2010 that both Antarches luqueti and Oxyptilus aguessei Bigot, 1964 match specimens of Oxyptilus tessmanni Strand, 1913.

== Species ==
- Antarches tessmanni (Strand, 1913)
