= Michaelophorus nubilus =

Scientific classification
- Domain: Eukaryota
- Kingdom: Animalia
- Phylum: Arthropoda
- Class: Insecta
- Order: Lepidoptera
- Family: Pterophoridae
- Genus: Michaelophorus
- Species: M. nubilus

Binomial name
- Michaelophorus nubilus (C. Felder, R. Felder & Rogenhofer, 1875)

Synonyms
- Oxyptilus nubilus Felder & Rogenhofer, 1875; Platyptilia virilis Meyrick, 1916

Species of plume moth

Michaelophorus nubilus, the cacao plume moth, is a species of moth in the genus Michaelophorus known from Venezuela, Peru, Ecuador, Brazil, Colombia, Honduras, Costa Rica, and Trinidad. Moths of this species take flight in January, February, and July and have a wingspan of approximately 12–15 millimetres (0.47–0.59 in).
