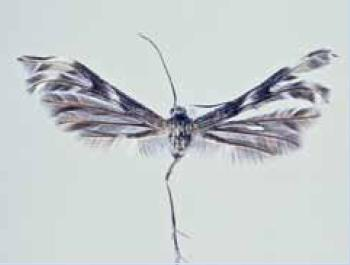

Scientific classification
- Kingdom: Animalia
- Phylum: Arthropoda
- Clade: Pancrustacea
- Class: Insecta
- Order: Lepidoptera
- Family: Pterophoridae
- Genus: Singularia
- Species: S. solisi

Binomial name
- Singularia solisi (Gielis & Matthews-Lott, 1994)

Synonyms
- Chocophorus solisi Gielis & Matthews-Lott, 1994)

= Singularia solisi =

Species of plume moth

Singularia solisi is a moth of the family Pterophoridae. It is found in El Salvador.

The wingspan is about 32 mm. Adults have been recorded in August.
