= Walsinghamiella vibrans =

Scientific classification
- Kingdom: Animalia
- Phylum: Arthropoda
- Class: Insecta
- Order: Lepidoptera
- Family: Pterophoridae
- Genus: Walsinghamiella
- Species: W. vibrans

Binomial name
- Walsinghamiella vibrans (Meyrick, 1921)

Synonyms
- Oxyptilus vibrans Meyrick, 1921

Species of plume moth

Walsinghamiella vibrans is a moth of the family Pterophoridae. It is known from South Africa.
