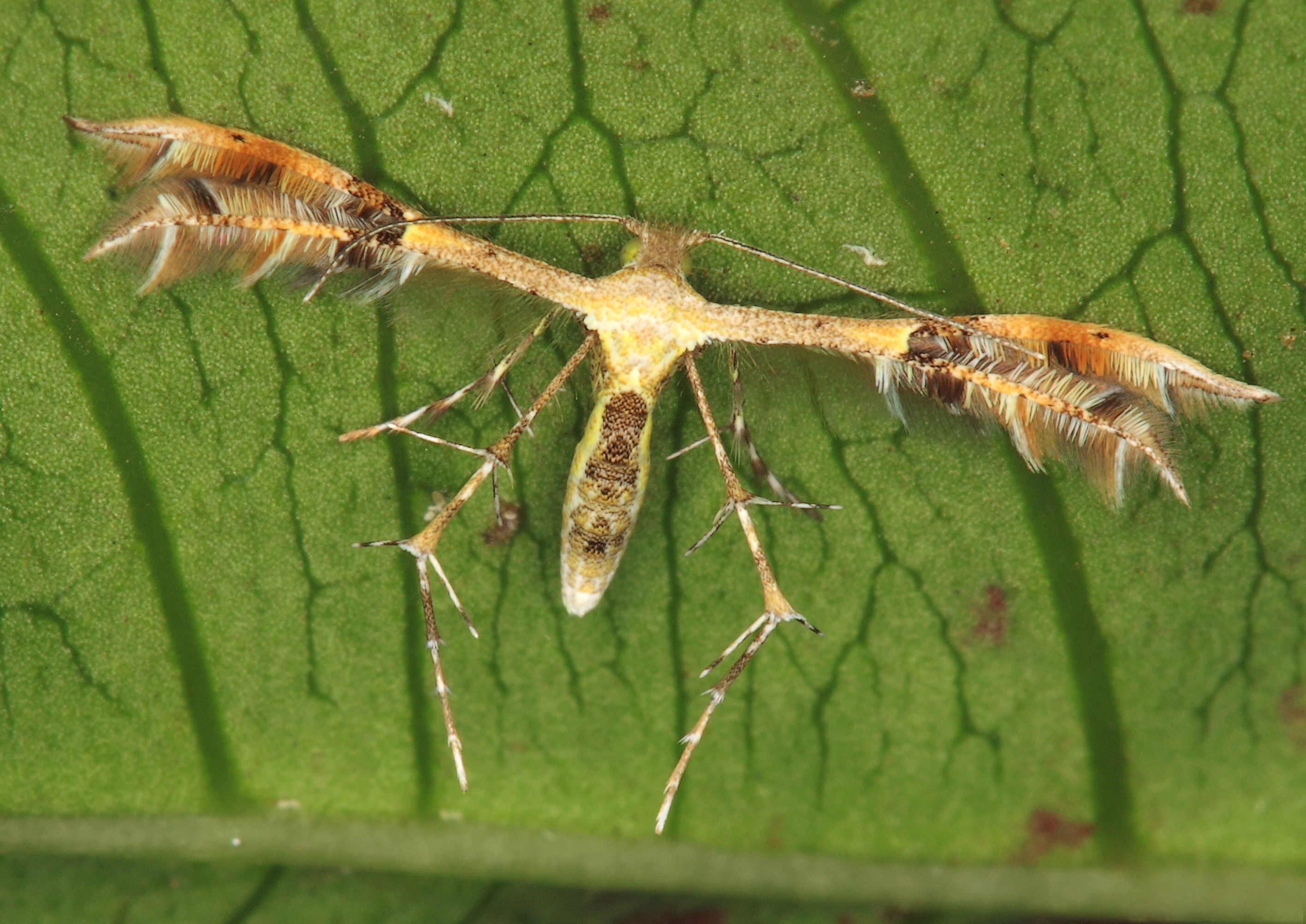

Scientific classification
- Kingdom: Animalia
- Phylum: Arthropoda
- Class: Insecta
- Order: Lepidoptera
- Family: Pterophoridae
- Genus: Diacrotricha
- Species: D. fasciola

Binomial name
- Diacrotricha fasciola (Zeller, 1851)

Synonyms
- Diacrotricha callimeres Meyrick

= Diacrotricha fasciola =

Starfruit flowermoth

Species of plume moth

Diacrotricha fasciola, commonly known as the starfruit flowermoth, is a species of moth in the family Pterophoridae. It is widely distributed throughout south-east Asia.

The larvae feed on Averrhoa carambola and Averrhoa bilimbi. They bore in the flower buds and feed on the flowers. They are considered a serious pest.
