= Paracapperia anatolicus =

Scientific classification
- Kingdom: Animalia
- Phylum: Arthropoda
- Class: Insecta
- Order: Lepidoptera
- Family: Pterophoridae
- Genus: Paracapperia
- Species: P. anatolicus

Binomial name
- Paracapperia anatolicus (Caradja, 1920)

Synonyms
- Oxyptilus anatolicus Caradja, 1920; Capperia tamsi Adamczewski, 1951

Species of plume moth

Paracapperia anatolicus is a moth of the family Pterophoridae described by Aristide Caradja in 1920. It is found in Greece, Asia Minor and Syria. There are also records from Spain and Romania, but these seem doubtful.
