= Melanoptilia haemogastra =

Scientific classification
- Kingdom: Animalia
- Phylum: Arthropoda
- Class: Insecta
- Order: Lepidoptera
- Family: Pterophoridae
- Genus: Melanoptilia
- Species: M. haemogastra

Binomial name
- Melanoptilia haemogastra (Meyrick, 1926)

Synonyms
- Platyptilia haemogastra Meyrick, 1926; Postplatyptilia haemogastra

Species of plume moth

Melanoptilia haemogastra is a moth of the family Pterophoridae. It is known from Peru.

The wingspan is about 15 mm.
