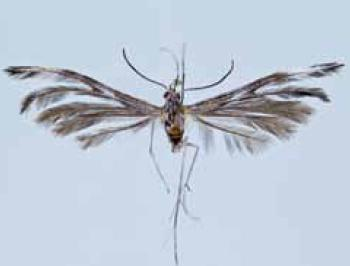

Scientific classification
- Kingdom: Animalia
- Phylum: Arthropoda
- Class: Insecta
- Order: Lepidoptera
- Family: Pterophoridae
- Genus: Singularia
- Species: S. leptochorda

Binomial name
- Singularia leptochorda (Meyrick, 1913)

Synonyms
- Alucita leptochorda Meyrick, 1913; Alucita trichogramma Walsingham, 1915; Chocophora leptochorda (Meyrick, 1913)

= Singularia leptochorda =

Species of plume moth

Singularia leptochorda is a moth of the family Pterophoridae. It is found in Costa Rica, Ecuador and Venezuela.

The wingspan is 12–25 mm (0.5–1.0 in). Adults have been recorded in February and May.
