= Crassuncus livingstoni =

Scientific classification
- Kingdom: Animalia
- Phylum: Arthropoda
- Clade: Pancrustacea
- Class: Insecta
- Order: Lepidoptera
- Family: Pterophoridae
- Genus: Crassuncus
- Species: C. livingstoni

Binomial name
- Crassuncus livingstoni Kovtunovich & Ustjuzhanin, 2014

Species of plume moth

Crassuncus livingstoni is a moth of the family Pterophoridae. It is known from Malawi.
