= Asiaephorus sythoffi =

Scientific classification
- Kingdom: Animalia
- Phylum: Arthropoda
- Class: Insecta
- Order: Lepidoptera
- Family: Pterophoridae
- Genus: Asiaephorus
- Species: A. sythoffi

Binomial name
- Asiaephorus sythoffi (Snellen, 1903)

Synonyms
- Platyptilia sythoffi Snellen, 1903

Species of plume moth

Asiaephorus sythoffi is a moth of the family Pterophoridae. It is known from Java and Taiwan.

The wingspan is 16–18 mm.
