= Helpaphorus testaceus =

Scientific classification
- Domain: Eukaryota
- Kingdom: Animalia
- Phylum: Arthropoda
- Class: Insecta
- Order: Lepidoptera
- Family: Pterophoridae
- Genus: Helpaphorus
- Species: H. testaceus

Binomial name
- Helpaphorus testaceus Gibeaux, 1994

Species of plume moth

Helpaphorus testaceus is a moth of the family Pterophoridae. It is known from Madagascar.
