= Picardia eparches =

Scientific classification
- Kingdom: Animalia
- Phylum: Arthropoda
- Class: Insecta
- Order: Lepidoptera
- Family: Pterophoridae
- Genus: Picardia
- Species: P. eparches

Binomial name
- Picardia eparches (Meyrick, 1931)

Synonyms
- Pterophorus eparches Meyrick, 1931

Species of plume moth

Picardia eparches is a moth of the family Pterophoridae. It is known from Kenya and Uganda.

The wingspan is 20–25 mm.
