= Fletcherella niphadarcha =

Scientific classification
- Kingdom: Animalia
- Phylum: Arthropoda
- Class: Insecta
- Order: Lepidoptera
- Family: Pterophoridae
- Genus: Fletcherella
- Species: F. niphadarcha

Binomial name
- Fletcherella niphadarcha Meyrick, 1930

Synonyms
- Platyptilia heterolicma Meyrick, 1936

Species of plume moth

Fletcherella niphadarcha is a moth of the family Pterophoridae. It is known from Cameroon, the Democratic Republic of Congo and Uganda.
