= Picardia orchatias =

Scientific classification
- Kingdom: Animalia
- Phylum: Arthropoda
- Class: Insecta
- Order: Lepidoptera
- Family: Pterophoridae
- Genus: Picardia
- Species: P. orchatias

Binomial name
- Picardia orchatias (Meyrick, 1908)

Synonyms
- Pterophorus orchatias Meyrick, 1908; Pterophorus imerinae Bigot, 1964

Species of plume moth

Picardia orchatias is a moth of the family Pterophoridae. It is known from Madagascar and South Africa. This species has a wingspan of 23mm
