= Oirata taklamakanus =

Scientific classification
- Kingdom: Animalia
- Phylum: Arthropoda
- Class: Insecta
- Order: Lepidoptera
- Family: Pterophoridae
- Genus: Oirata
- Species: O. taklamakanus

Binomial name
- Oirata taklamakanus (Arenberger, 1995)

Synonyms
- Pterophorus taklamakanus Arenberger, 1995

Species of plume moth

Oirata taklamakanus is a moth of the family Pterophoridae. It is found in Turkey.
