= Fuscoptilia sinuata =

Scientific classification
- Domain: Eukaryota
- Kingdom: Animalia
- Phylum: Arthropoda
- Class: Insecta
- Order: Lepidoptera
- Family: Pterophoridae
- Genus: Fuscoptilia
- Species: F. sinuata

Binomial name
- Fuscoptilia sinuata (Qin & Zheng, 1997)

Synonyms
- Stenoptilia sinuata Qin & Zheng, 1997; Fuscoptilia hoenei Arenberger, 1999

Species of plume moth

Fuscoptilia sinuata is a moth of the family Pterophoridae. It is found in Yunnan, China.

The wingspan is about 23 mm.
