= Michaelophorus hodgesi =

Scientific classification
- Kingdom: Animalia
- Phylum: Arthropoda
- Clade: Pancrustacea
- Class: Insecta
- Order: Lepidoptera
- Family: Pterophoridae
- Genus: Michaelophorus
- Species: M. hodgesi

Binomial name
- Michaelophorus hodgesi Gielis, 1999

Species of plume moth

Michaelophorus hodgesi is a species of moth in the genus Michaelophorus known from Puerto Rico. Moths of this species take flight in May and have a wingspan of approximately 10 millimetres (0.39 in).
