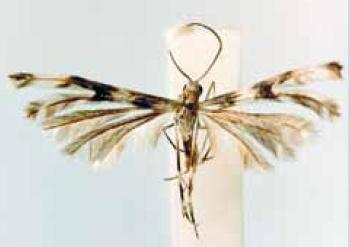

Scientific classification
- Kingdom: Animalia
- Phylum: Arthropoda
- Class: Insecta
- Order: Lepidoptera
- Family: Pterophoridae
- Genus: Singularia
- Species: S. venedictoffi

Binomial name
- Singularia venedictoffi (Gielis & D.L. Matthews, 1994)

Synonyms
- Chocophorus venedictoffi Gielis & D.L. Matthews, 1994

= Singularia venedictoffi =

Species of plume moth

Singularia venedictoffi is a moth of the family Pterophoridae. It is found in Ecuador.

The wingspan is 18–20 mm. Adults have been recorded in March.

== Etymology ==
The species is named after Nadian Venedictoff, who collected the species.
