= Sochchora dotina =

Scientific classification
- Kingdom: Animalia
- Phylum: Arthropoda
- Class: Insecta
- Order: Lepidoptera
- Family: Pterophoridae
- Genus: Sochchora
- Species: S. dotina

Binomial name
- Sochchora dotina Walsingham, 1915

Species of plume moth

Sochchora dotina is a moth of the family Pterophoridae. It is known from Brazil and Panama.

The wingspan is about 14 mm. Adults are on wing in November.
