= Arcoptilia gizan =

Scientific classification
- Kingdom: Animalia
- Phylum: Arthropoda
- Class: Insecta
- Order: Lepidoptera
- Family: Pterophoridae
- Genus: Arcoptilia
- Species: A. gizan

Binomial name
- Arcoptilia gizan Arenberger, 1985

Species of plume moth

Arcoptilia gizan is a moth of the family Pterophoridae. It is known from Ethiopia, Somalia, Oman, Saudi Arabia, and Yemen.
