= Septuagint (disambiguation) =

Septuagint may refer to:

- Septuagint, a translation of the Hebrew Bible and Deuterocanonical books into Koine Greek.
- Septuagint manuscripts, the Library of Alexandria translation of Jewish scriptures into Koine Greek as it exists in various manuscript versions.

== See also ==
- Hebrew Bible (disambiguation)
- Septuaginta zagulajevi, a genus of moth in the family Pterophoridae.
- Septuagintillion refers to names of large numbers.
- Septuagesima, the name for the ninth Sunday before Easter, the third before Ash Wednesday.
