= Helpaphorus festivus =

Scientific classification
- Kingdom: Animalia
- Phylum: Arthropoda
- Clade: Pancrustacea
- Class: Insecta
- Order: Lepidoptera
- Family: Pterophoridae
- Genus: Helpaphorus
- Species: H. festivus

Binomial name
- Helpaphorus festivus (Bigot, 1964)

Synonyms
- Pselnophorus festivus Bigot, 1964

Species of plume moth

Helpaphorus festivus is a moth of the family Pterophoridae. It is known from Madagascar.

The larvae feed on Helichrysum cordifolium.
