= Fletcherella niphadothysana =

Scientific classification
- Domain: Eukaryota
- Kingdom: Animalia
- Phylum: Arthropoda
- Class: Insecta
- Order: Lepidoptera
- Family: Pterophoridae
- Genus: Fletcherella
- Species: F. niphadothysana

Binomial name
- Fletcherella niphadothysana Diakonoff, 1952

Species of plume moth

Fletcherella niphadothysana is a genus of moths of the family Pterophoridae. It is known from Irian Jaya, Java and Sumbawa in Indonesia and Leyte in the Philippines.
