= Diacrotricha guttuligera =

Scientific classification
- Kingdom: Animalia
- Phylum: Arthropoda
- Class: Insecta
- Order: Lepidoptera
- Family: Pterophoridae
- Genus: Diacrotricha
- Species: D. guttuligera

Binomial name
- Diacrotricha guttuligera Diakonoff, 1952

Species of plume moth

Diacrotricha guttuligera is a moth of the family Pterophoridae. It is known from New Guinea.
