= Crassuncus orophilus =

Scientific classification
- Kingdom: Animalia
- Phylum: Arthropoda
- Clade: Pancrustacea
- Class: Insecta
- Order: Lepidoptera
- Family: Pterophoridae
- Genus: Crassuncus
- Species: C. orophilus

Binomial name
- Crassuncus orophilus Gibeaux, 1994

Species of plume moth

Crassuncus orophilus is a moth of the family Pterophoridae. It is known from Madagascar.
