= Sochchora albipunctella =

Scientific classification
- Kingdom: Animalia
- Phylum: Arthropoda
- Class: Insecta
- Order: Lepidoptera
- Family: Pterophoridae
- Genus: Sochchora
- Species: S. albipunctella

Binomial name
- Sochchora albipunctella T. B. Fletcher, 1911

Species of plume moth

Sochchora albipunctella is a moth of the family Pterophoridae. It is known from Brazil.

The wingspan is 13–15 mm. Adults are on wing in January.
