= Heptaloba argyriodactylus =

Scientific classification
- Domain: Eukaryota
- Kingdom: Animalia
- Phylum: Arthropoda
- Class: Insecta
- Order: Lepidoptera
- Family: Pterophoridae
- Genus: Heptaloba
- Species: H. argyriodactylus

Binomial name
- Heptaloba argyriodactylus (Walker, 1864)

Synonyms
- Platyptilus argyriodactylus Walker, 1864

Species of plume moth

Heptaloba argyriodactylus is a moth of the family Pterophoridae. It was described by Francis Walker in 1864, and it is found in Sri Lanka.
