= Sochchora donatella =

Scientific classification
- Kingdom: Animalia
- Phylum: Arthropoda
- Class: Insecta
- Order: Lepidoptera
- Family: Pterophoridae
- Genus: Sochchora
- Species: S. donatella

Binomial name
- Sochchora donatella Walker, 1864

Species of plume moth

Sochchora donatella is a moth of the family Pterophoridae. It is known from Brazil, British Guyana, Venezuela and Peru.

The wingspan is about 14 mm. Adults are on wing in July.
