= Picardia betsileo =

Scientific classification
- Kingdom: Animalia
- Phylum: Arthropoda
- Clade: Pancrustacea
- Class: Insecta
- Order: Lepidoptera
- Family: Pterophoridae
- Genus: Picardia
- Species: P. betsileo

Binomial name
- Picardia betsileo Gibeaux, 1994

Species of plume moth

Picardia betsileo is a moth of the family Pterophoridae. It is known from Madagascar.
