= Uroloba calycospila =

Scientific classification
- Kingdom: Animalia
- Phylum: Arthropoda
- Class: Insecta
- Order: Lepidoptera
- Family: Pterophoridae
- Genus: Uroloba
- Species: U. calycospila

Binomial name
- Uroloba calycospila (Meyrick, 1932)

Synonyms
- Utuca calycospila Meyrick, 1932

Species of plume moth

Uroloba calycospila is a moth of the family Pterophoridae. It is known from Argentina.

The wingspan is 19–20 mm. Adults are on wing in January and February.
