= Fuscoptilia jarosi =

Scientific classification
- Kingdom: Animalia
- Phylum: Arthropoda
- Class: Insecta
- Order: Lepidoptera
- Family: Pterophoridae
- Genus: Fuscoptilia
- Species: F. jarosi

Binomial name
- Fuscoptilia jarosi Arenberger, 1991

Species of plume moth

Fuscoptilia jarosi is a moth of the family Pterophoridae. It is found in South Korea.

Adults have been recorded in June.
