= Oirata poculidactyla =

Scientific classification
- Kingdom: Animalia
- Phylum: Arthropoda
- Clade: Pancrustacea
- Class: Insecta
- Order: Lepidoptera
- Family: Pterophoridae
- Genus: Oirata
- Species: O. poculidactyla

Binomial name
- Oirata poculidactyla (K. Nupponen & T. Nupponen, 2001)

Synonyms
- Pterophorus poculidactyla K. Nupponen & T. Nupponen, 2001; Oirata smirnovi Ustjuzhanin & Kovtunovitch, 2002

Species of plume moth

Oirata poculidactyla is a moth of the family Pterophoridae. It is found in Russia (the Altai Mountains).
