= Bigotilia montana =

Scientific classification
- Kingdom: Animalia
- Phylum: Arthropoda
- Clade: Pancrustacea
- Class: Insecta
- Order: Lepidoptera
- Family: Pterophoridae
- Genus: Bigotilia
- Species: B. montana

Binomial name
- Bigotilia montana Gibeaux, 1994

Species of plume moth

Bigotilia montana is a moth of the family Pterophoridae. It is known from Madagascar.
