= Crassuncus colubratus =

Scientific classification
- Kingdom: Animalia
- Phylum: Arthropoda
- Class: Insecta
- Order: Lepidoptera
- Family: Pterophoridae
- Genus: Crassuncus
- Species: C. colubratus

Binomial name
- Crassuncus colubratus (Meyrick, 1909)

Synonyms
- Pterophorus colubratus Meyrick, 1909; Hellinsia colubratus

Species of plume moth

Crassuncus colubratus is a moth of the family Pterophoridae. It is known from South Africa.
