= Heptaloba tanglong =

Scientific classification
- Kingdom: Animalia
- Phylum: Arthropoda
- Clade: Pancrustacea
- Class: Insecta
- Order: Lepidoptera
- Family: Pterophoridae
- Genus: Heptaloba
- Species: H. tanglong

Binomial name
- Heptaloba tanglong Ustjuzhanin & Kovtunovich, 2010

Species of plume moth

Heptaloba tanglong is a moth of the family Pterophoridae described by Petr Ya. Ustjuzhanin and Vasily N. Kovtunovich in 2010. It is found in Vietnam. The habitat consists of long-boled forest with the predominance of Lagerstroemia species and various legumes, including Afzelia xylocarpa.

The wingspan is about 15 mm.
