= Quadriptilia rectangulodactyla =

Scientific classification
- Kingdom: Animalia
- Phylum: Arthropoda
- Class: Insecta
- Order: Lepidoptera
- Family: Pterophoridae
- Genus: Quadriptilia
- Species: Q. rectangulodactyla

Binomial name
- Quadriptilia rectangulodactyla Gielis, 1994

Species of plume moth

Quadriptilia rectangulodactyla is a moth of the family Pterophoridae. It is known from Peru.

The wingspan is about 27 mm. Adults are on wing in June and December.
