= Quadriptilia obscurodactyla =

Scientific classification
- Kingdom: Animalia
- Phylum: Arthropoda
- Class: Insecta
- Order: Lepidoptera
- Family: Pterophoridae
- Genus: Quadriptilia
- Species: Q. obscurodactyla

Binomial name
- Quadriptilia obscurodactyla Gielis, 1994

Species of plume moth

Quadriptilia obscurodactyla is a moth of the family Pterophoridae. It is known from Colombia and Ecuador.

The wingspan is about 32 mm.
