= Helpaphorus griveaudi =

Scientific classification
- Kingdom: Animalia
- Phylum: Arthropoda
- Clade: Pancrustacea
- Class: Insecta
- Order: Lepidoptera
- Family: Pterophoridae
- Genus: Helpaphorus
- Species: H. griveaudi

Binomial name
- Helpaphorus griveaudi (Bigot, 1964)

Synonyms
- Aciptilia griveaudi Bigot, 1964

Species of plume moth

Helpaphorus griveaudi is a moth of the family Pterophoridae. It is known from Madagascar.
