= Crassuncus timidus =

Scientific classification
- Kingdom: Animalia
- Phylum: Arthropoda
- Clade: Pancrustacea
- Class: Insecta
- Order: Lepidoptera
- Family: Pterophoridae
- Genus: Crassuncus
- Species: C. timidus

Binomial name
- Crassuncus timidus (Meyrick, 1908)

Synonyms
- Pterophorus timidus Meyrick, 1908; Hellinsia timidus

Species of plume moth

Crassuncus timidus is a moth of the family Pterophoridae. It is known from South Africa.
