= Vietteilus vigens =

Scientific classification
- Kingdom: Animalia
- Phylum: Arthropoda
- Class: Insecta
- Order: Lepidoptera
- Family: Pterophoridae
- Genus: Vietteilus
- Species: V. vigens

Binomial name
- Vietteilus vigens (Felder & Rogenhofer, 1875)

Synonyms
- Platyptilia maligna Meyrick, 1913; Oxyptilus vigens Felder & Rogenhofer, 1875; Amblyptilia vigens

Species of plume moth

Vietteilus vigens is a moth of the family Pterophoridae that is known from South Africa.
