= Vietteilus borbonica =

Scientific classification
- Kingdom: Animalia
- Phylum: Arthropoda
- Class: Insecta
- Order: Lepidoptera
- Family: Pterophoridae
- Genus: Vietteilus
- Species: V. borbonica

Binomial name
- Vietteilus borbonica (Viette, 1957)

Synonyms
- Platyptilia borbonica Viette, 1957

Species of plume moth

Vietteilus borbonica is a moth of the family Pterophoridae that is known from La Réunion and Tanzania.
