= Apoxyptilus anthites =

Scientific classification
- Kingdom: Animalia
- Phylum: Arthropoda
- Class: Insecta
- Order: Lepidoptera
- Family: Pterophoridae
- Genus: Apoxyptilus
- Species: A. anthites

Binomial name
- Apoxyptilus anthites (Meyrick, 1936)

Synonyms
- Oxyptilus anthites Meyrick, 1936

Species of plume moth

Apoxyptilus anthites is a species of moth in the family Pterophoridae. It is known to originate from Kenya, South Africa, Tanzania and Uganda.

The wingspan is 9–11 mm.

The larvae feed on the buds of Dombeya emarginata.
