= Bigotilia centralis =

Scientific classification
- Kingdom: Animalia
- Phylum: Arthropoda
- Clade: Pancrustacea
- Class: Insecta
- Order: Lepidoptera
- Family: Pterophoridae
- Genus: Bigotilia
- Species: B. centralis

Binomial name
- Bigotilia centralis (Bigot, 1964)

Synonyms
- Platyptilia centralis Bigot, 1964

Species of plume moth

Bigotilia centralis is a moth of the family Pterophoridae. It is known from Madagascar.
