= Crassuncus defectus =

Scientific classification
- Kingdom: Animalia
- Phylum: Arthropoda
- Clade: Pancrustacea
- Class: Insecta
- Order: Lepidoptera
- Family: Pterophoridae
- Genus: Crassuncus
- Species: C. defectus

Binomial name
- Crassuncus defectus (Bigot & Luquet, 1991)

Synonyms
- Pterophorus defectus Bigot & Luquet, 1991

Species of plume moth

Crassuncus defectus is a moth of the family Pterophoridae. It is known from Madagascar.
