= Michaelophorus dentiger =

Scientific classification
- Kingdom: Animalia
- Phylum: Arthropoda
- Class: Insecta
- Order: Lepidoptera
- Family: Pterophoridae
- Genus: Michaelophorus
- Species: M. dentiger

Binomial name
- Michaelophorus dentiger (Meyrick, 1916)

Synonyms
- Oxyptilus dentiger Meyrick, 1916

Species of plume moth

Michaelophorus dentiger is a species of moth in the genus Michaelophorus known from Argentina, Brazil, British Guyana, Cuba, Curaçao, Honduras, Ecuador, Nicaragua, Paraguay, and Venezuela. The host plant for the species is suspected to be Hippomane mancinella. Moths of this species are in flight all year round and have a wingspan of approximately 13–15 millimetres (0.51–0.59 in).
