= Titanoptilus serrulatus =

Scientific classification
- Kingdom: Animalia
- Phylum: Arthropoda
- Class: Insecta
- Order: Lepidoptera
- Family: Pterophoridae
- Genus: Titanoptilus
- Species: T. serrulatus

Binomial name
- Titanoptilus serrulatus Meyrick, 1935

Species of plume moth

Titanoptilus serrulatus is a moth of the family Pterophoridae. It is known from Africa.The scientific name of this species was first validly published in 1935.
