= Titanoptilus procerus =

Scientific classification
- Kingdom: Animalia
- Phylum: Arthropoda
- Clade: Pancrustacea
- Class: Insecta
- Order: Lepidoptera
- Family: Pterophoridae
- Genus: Titanoptilus
- Species: T. procerus

Binomial name
- Titanoptilus procerus Bigot, 1969

Species of plume moth

Titanoptilus procerus is a moth of the family Pterophoridae. It is known from Africa.
