= Sochchora mulinus =

Scientific classification
- Kingdom: Animalia
- Phylum: Arthropoda
- Class: Insecta
- Order: Lepidoptera
- Family: Pterophoridae
- Genus: Sochchora
- Species: S. mulinus

Binomial name
- Sochchora mulinus Gielis, 2006

Species of plume moth

Sochchora mulinus is a moth of the family Pterophoridae. It is known from Brazil.

The wingspan is about 10 mm. Adults are on wing in November.
