= Lantanophaga minima =

Scientific classification
- Kingdom: Animalia
- Phylum: Arthropoda
- Clade: Pancrustacea
- Class: Insecta
- Order: Lepidoptera
- Family: Pterophoridae
- Genus: Lantanophaga
- Species: L. minima

Binomial name
- Lantanophaga minima (B. Landry & Gielis, 1992)

Synonyms
- Postplatyptilia minima B. Landry & Gielis, 1992

Species of plume moth

Lantanophaga minima is a moth of the family Pterophoridae. It is known from the Galápagos Islands.

The wingspan is about 10 mm. Adults are on wing in March.
