= Singularia walsinghami =

Scientific classification
- Kingdom: Animalia
- Phylum: Arthropoda
- Class: Insecta
- Order: Lepidoptera
- Family: Pterophoridae
- Genus: Singularia
- Species: S. walsinghami

Binomial name
- Singularia walsinghami (Fernald, 1898)

Synonyms
- Alucita walsinghami Fernald, 1898

Species of plume moth

Singularia walsinghami is a moth in the family Pterophoridae and is found in North America (including Colorado).

The wingspan is 25–26 mm. The head, thorax and abdomen are greyish white. The legs are pale brown and the fore wings are greyish white, brownish along the extreme costal margin. There is a more or less obsolete brown spot on the middle of the cell and three darker brown spots in the whitish costal fringe of the first lobe, one nearly over the end of the fissure, one at the middle and one near the end of the lobe. The remaining fringes are pale brown, white at the end of the fissure, along the middle of the costa of the second lobe, just before the apex of the hind margin, near the base of the lobe and beneath the outer fourth of the cell. The hindwings and fringes are pale brown.

== Etymology ==
The species is named in honor of Lord Walsingham.
