= Uroloba fuscicostata =

Scientific classification
- Kingdom: Animalia
- Phylum: Arthropoda
- Class: Insecta
- Order: Lepidoptera
- Family: Pterophoridae
- Genus: Uroloba
- Species: U. fuscicostata

Binomial name
- Uroloba fuscicostata Walsingham, 1891

Species of plume moth

Uroloba fuscicostata is a moth of the family Pterophoridae. It is known from Chile.

The wingspan is 21–24 mm. Adults are on wing in October, November and December.
