= Antarches tessmanni =

Scientific classification
- Kingdom: Animalia
- Phylum: Arthropoda
- Class: Insecta
- Order: Lepidoptera
- Family: Pterophoridae
- Genus: Antarches
- Species: A. tessmanni

Binomial name
- Antarches tessmanni (Strand, 1913)

Synonyms
- Oxyptilus tessmanni Strand, 1913; Megalorhipida tessmanni (Strand, 1913); Oxyptilus aquessei Bigot, 1964; Antarches aguessei (Bigot, 1964); Antarches luqueti Gibeaux, 1994

Species of moth

Antarches tessmanni is a moth of the family Pterophoridae that is known from Cameroon, Comoros, Congo, Equatorial Guinea, Ghana, Guinea, Ivory Coast, Madagascar, Malawi, Mauritius, Réunion, South Africa, Tanzania, Uganda, Yemen and Zimbabwe.

The larvae feed on Cinchona pubescens (Rubiaceae).
