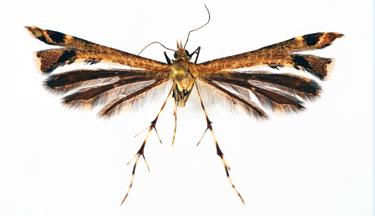
- Eucapperia continentalis

Scientific classification
- Kingdom: Animalia
- Phylum: Arthropoda
- Clade: Pancrustacea
- Class: Insecta
- Order: Lepidoptera
- Family: Pterophoridae
- Subfamily: Pterophorinae
- Tribe: Oxyptilini
- Genus: Eucapperia; Gibeaux, 1994

= Eucapperia =

Plume moth genus

Eucapperia is a genus of moths in the family Pterophoridae.

== Species ==
- Eucapperia bullifera Meyrick, 1918
- Eucapperia continentalis Gielis, 2008
- Eucapperia longiductus (Gibeaux, 1992
