= Crassuncus ecstaticus =

Scientific classification
- Kingdom: Animalia
- Phylum: Arthropoda
- Class: Insecta
- Order: Lepidoptera
- Family: Pterophoridae
- Genus: Crassuncus
- Species: C. ecstaticus

Binomial name
- Crassuncus ecstaticus (Meyrick, 1932)

Synonyms
- Pterophorus ecstaticus Meyrick, 1932; Hellinsia ecstaticus; Crassuncus chappuisi Gibeaux, 1994

Species of plume moth

Crassuncus ecstaticus is a moth of the family Pterophoridae. It is known from Uganda, Kenya and Malawi.
