= Walsinghamiella prolai =

Scientific classification
- Kingdom: Animalia
- Phylum: Arthropoda
- Clade: Pancrustacea
- Class: Insecta
- Order: Lepidoptera
- Family: Pterophoridae
- Genus: Walsinghamiella
- Species: W. prolai

Binomial name
- Walsinghamiella prolai (Gibeaux, 1994)

Synonyms
- Titanoptilus prolai Gibeaux, 1994

Species of plume moth

Walsinghamiella prolai is a moth of the family Pterophoridae. It is known from South Africa, the Comoros and Madagascar.
