= Michaelophorus margaritae =

Scientific classification
- Kingdom: Animalia
- Phylum: Arthropoda
- Class: Insecta
- Order: Lepidoptera
- Family: Pterophoridae
- Genus: Michaelophorus
- Species: M. margaritae

Binomial name
- Michaelophorus margaritae Gielis, 2006

Species of plume moth

Michaelophorus margaritae is a species of moth in the genus Michaelophorus known from Ecuador. It takes flight in May and has a wingspan of approximately 9–11 millimetres (0.35–0.43 in). The specific name refers to Margarita Pelz, the wife of the species' collector.
