= Picardia ruwenzoricus =

Scientific classification
- Kingdom: Animalia
- Phylum: Arthropoda
- Class: Insecta
- Order: Lepidoptera
- Family: Pterophoridae
- Genus: Picardia
- Species: P. ruwenzoricus

Binomial name
- Picardia ruwenzoricus (Gielis, 1991)

Synonyms
- Oidaematophorus ruwenzoricus Gielis, 1991

Species of plume moth

Picardia ruwenzoricus is a moth of the family Pterophoridae. It is known from the Democratic Republic of Congo.
