= Fuscoptilia emarginatus =

Scientific classification
- Domain: Eukaryota
- Kingdom: Animalia
- Phylum: Arthropoda
- Class: Insecta
- Order: Lepidoptera
- Family: Pterophoridae
- Genus: Fuscoptilia
- Species: F. emarginatus

Binomial name
- Fuscoptilia emarginatus (Snellen, 1884)

Synonyms
- Fuscoptilia emarginata; Pterophorus emarginatus Snellen, 1884; Mimaesoptilus emarginatus; Platyptilia emarginata; Stenoptilia emarginata; Marasmarcha emarginata; Marasmarcha bajanica Fazekas, 2003; Stenoptilia nakanensis Matsumura, 1931; Stenoptilia sapporensis Matsumura, 1931; Platyptilia metricoterma Caradja, 1920

Species of plume moth

Fuscoptilia emarginatus is a moth of the family Pterophoridae. It is found in the Hokkaido, Honshu and Kyushu islands of Japan, the Kuril Islands, Korea, China and Amur. It is also known from Mongolia.

The length of the forewings is 8–12 mm.

The larvae feed on Lespedeza bicolor and Lespedeza cuneata. The adult appears from May to September.
