= Michaelophorus shafferi =

Scientific classification
- Kingdom: Animalia
- Phylum: Arthropoda
- Class: Insecta
- Order: Lepidoptera
- Family: Pterophoridae
- Genus: Michaelophorus
- Species: M. shafferi

Binomial name
- Michaelophorus shafferi Gielis, 1999

Species of plume moth

Michaelophorus shafferi is a species of moth in the genus Michaelophorus known from Brazil. Moths of this species take flight in April and have a wingspan of about 9 millimetres (0.35 in).
