= Paraamblyptilia eutalanta =

Scientific classification
- Kingdom: Animalia
- Phylum: Arthropoda
- Class: Insecta
- Order: Lepidoptera
- Family: Pterophoridae
- Genus: Paraamblyptilia
- Species: P. eutalanta

Binomial name
- Paraamblyptilia eutalanta (Meyrick, 1931)

Synonyms
- Platyptilia eutalanta Meyrick, 1931

Species of plume moth

Paraamblyptilia eutalanta is a moth of the family Pterophoridae. It is known from Argentina and Chile.

The wingspan is 15–16 mm. Adults are on wing in November and December.
