= Lantanophaga anellatus =

Scientific classification
- Domain: Eukaryota
- Kingdom: Animalia
- Phylum: Arthropoda
- Class: Insecta
- Order: Lepidoptera
- Family: Pterophoridae
- Genus: Lantanophaga
- Species: L. anellatus

Binomial name
- Lantanophaga anellatus Rose and Pooni, 2003

Species of plume moth

Lantanophaga anellatus is a moth of the family Pterophoridae. It is known from India (Punjab and Himachal Pradesh).

The wingspan is 12–13 mm.
