= Titanoptilus stenodactylus =

Scientific classification
- Kingdom: Animalia
- Phylum: Arthropoda
- Class: Insecta
- Order: Lepidoptera
- Family: Pterophoridae
- Genus: Titanoptilus
- Species: T. stenodactylus

Binomial name
- Titanoptilus stenodactylus (T. B. Fletcher, 1911)

Synonyms
- Oxyptilus stenodactylus T. B. Fletcher, 1911; Macrotinactis stenodactylus; Titanoptilus patellatus Meyrick, 1913; Titanoptilus laniger Bigot, 1969

Species of plume moth

Titanoptilus stenodactylus is a moth in the family Pterophoridae first described by Thomas Bainbrigge Fletcher in 1911. It is known from South Africa, Tanzania, the Democratic Republic of the Congo and the Comoros.
