= Asiaephorus narada =

Scientific classification
- Kingdom: Animalia
- Phylum: Arthropoda
- Clade: Pancrustacea
- Class: Insecta
- Order: Lepidoptera
- Family: Pterophoridae
- Genus: Asiaephorus
- Species: A. narada

Binomial name
- Asiaephorus narada Kovtunovich & Ustyuzhanin, 2003

Species of plume moth

Asiaephorus narada is a moth of the family Pterophoridae that is endemic to China.

The wingspan is 17–18 millimetres (0.67–0.71 in).
