= Helpaphorus imaitso =

Scientific classification
- Kingdom: Animalia
- Phylum: Arthropoda
- Clade: Pancrustacea
- Class: Insecta
- Order: Lepidoptera
- Family: Pterophoridae
- Genus: Helpaphorus
- Species: H. imaitso

Binomial name
- Helpaphorus imaitso Gibeaux, 1994

Species of moth

Helpaphorus imaitso is a moth of the family Pterophoridae. It is known from Madagascar.

The larvae feed on Helichrysum triplinerve.
