= Crassuncus pacifica =

Scientific classification
- Kingdom: Animalia
- Phylum: Arthropoda
- Class: Insecta
- Order: Lepidoptera
- Family: Pterophoridae
- Genus: Crassuncus
- Species: C. pacifica

Binomial name
- Crassuncus pacifica (Meyrick, 1911)

Synonyms
- Marasmarcha pacifica Meyrick, 1911; Hellinsia pacifica; Pterophorus ambitiosus Meyrick, 1911; Pterophorus purus Meyrick, 1913; Hellinsia purus (Meyrick, 1913)

Species of plume moth

Crassuncus pacifica is a moth of the family Pterophoridae. It is known from South Africa and Malawi.
