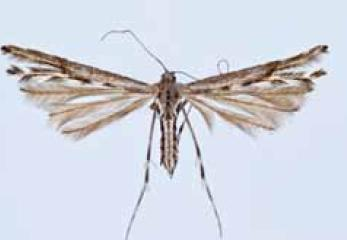

Scientific classification
- Kingdom: Animalia
- Phylum: Arthropoda
- Clade: Pancrustacea
- Class: Insecta
- Order: Lepidoptera
- Family: Pterophoridae
- Genus: Singularia
- Species: S. alternaria

Binomial name
- Singularia alternaria (Zeller, 1874)

Synonyms
- Aciptilia alternaria Zeller, 1874; Aciplilia alternarius; Chocophorus alternaria; Pselnophorus alternarius

= Singularia alternaria =

Species of plume moth

Singularia alternaria is a moth of the family Pterophoridae. It is found in Argentina, Chile and Ecuador.

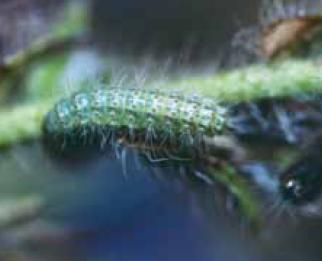
Larva

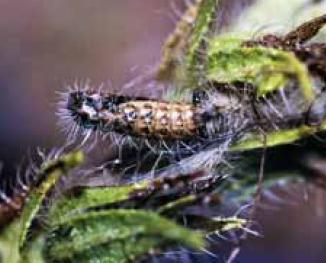
Pupa

The wingspan is 13–21 mm. Adults have been recorded from October to February.

The larvae feed on Echium plantagineum, Echium vulgare and Malus sylvestris. They feed on the shoots and flowers.
