= Arcoptilia pongola =

Scientific classification
- Kingdom: Animalia
- Phylum: Arthropoda
- Clade: Pancrustacea
- Class: Insecta
- Order: Lepidoptera
- Family: Pterophoridae
- Genus: Arcoptilia
- Species: A. pongola

Binomial name
- Arcoptilia pongola Ustjuzhanin et Kovtunovich, 2010

Species of plume moth

Arcoptilia pongola is a moth of the family Pterophoridae. It is known from South Africa.
