= Asiaephorus extremus =

Scientific classification
- Kingdom: Animalia
- Phylum: Arthropoda
- Class: Insecta
- Order: Lepidoptera
- Family: Pterophoridae
- Genus: Asiaephorus
- Species: A. extremus

Binomial name
- Asiaephorus extremus Gielis, 2003

Species of plume moth

Asiaephorus extremus is a moth of the family Pterophoridae. It is known from Mindanao in the Philippines.

The wingspan is about 16 mm. Adults are on wing in August.

== Etymology ==
The name expresses the very long cucullar process in the male genitalia.
