= Lantanophaga dubitationis =

Scientific classification
- Kingdom: Animalia
- Phylum: Arthropoda
- Class: Insecta
- Order: Lepidoptera
- Family: Pterophoridae
- Genus: Lantanophaga
- Species: L. dubitationis

Binomial name
- Lantanophaga dubitationis Gielis & De Vos, 2007

Species of plume moth

Lantanophaga dubitationis is a moth of the family Pterophoridae. It is known from New Guinea.
