= Crassuncus pseudolaudatus =

Scientific classification
- Kingdom: Animalia
- Phylum: Arthropoda
- Clade: Pancrustacea
- Class: Insecta
- Order: Lepidoptera
- Family: Pterophoridae
- Genus: Crassuncus
- Species: C. pseudolaudatus

Binomial name
- Crassuncus pseudolaudatus (Gibeaux, 1992)

Synonyms
- Pterophorus pseudolaudatus Gibeaux, 1992

Species of plume moth

Crassuncus pseudolaudatus is a moth of the family Pterophoridae. It is known from Madagascar.
