= Melanoptilia arsenica =

Scientific classification
- Kingdom: Animalia
- Phylum: Arthropoda
- Class: Insecta
- Order: Lepidoptera
- Family: Pterophoridae
- Genus: Melanoptilia
- Species: M. arsenica

Binomial name
- Melanoptilia arsenica (Meyrick, 1921)

Synonyms
- Platyptilia arsenica Meyrick, 1921

Species of plume moth

Melanoptilia arsenica is a moth of the family Pterophoridae. It is known from Bolivia, Brazil, Costa Rica and Peru.

The wingspan is 16–17 mm. Adults are on wing in March.
