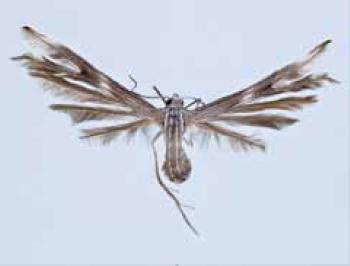

Scientific classification
- Kingdom: Animalia
- Phylum: Arthropoda
- Class: Insecta
- Order: Lepidoptera
- Family: Pterophoridae
- Genus: Singularia
- Species: S. mayaensis

Binomial name
- Singularia mayaensis (Gielis, 2011)

Synonyms
- Chocophorus mayaensis Gielis, 2011}

= Singularia mayaensis =

Species of plume moth

Singularia mayaensis is a moth of the family Pterophoridae. It is found in Costa Rica.

The wingspan is 26 mm. Adults are on wing in January, August and September at altitudes between 1,500 and 2,200 m.
