= Paraamblyptilia ridouti =

Scientific classification
- Kingdom: Animalia
- Phylum: Arthropoda
- Class: Insecta
- Order: Lepidoptera
- Family: Pterophoridae
- Genus: Paraamblyptilia
- Species: P. ridouti

Binomial name
- Paraamblyptilia ridouti Gielis, 1996

Species of plume moth

Paraamblyptilia ridouti is a moth of the family Pterophoridae. It is known from Costa Rica and Peru.

The wingspan is 17–18 mm. Adults are on wing in August and September.
