= Michaelophorus bahiaensis =

Scientific classification
- Kingdom: Animalia
- Phylum: Arthropoda
- Class: Insecta
- Order: Lepidoptera
- Family: Pterophoridae
- Genus: Michaelophorus
- Species: M. bahiaensis

Binomial name
- Michaelophorus bahiaensis Gielis, 2006

Species of plume moth

Michaelophorus bahiaensis is a species of moth in the genus Michaelophorus known from Brazil. Moths of this species take flight in November and have a wingspan of about 9 millimetres (0.35 in). The specific name is derived from the state of Bahia, whence the species is known.
