= Walsinghamiella eques =

Scientific classification
- Kingdom: Animalia
- Phylum: Arthropoda
- Class: Insecta
- Order: Lepidoptera
- Family: Pterophoridae
- Genus: Walsinghamiella
- Species: W. eques

Binomial name
- Walsinghamiella eques (Walsingham, 1891)

Synonyms
- Platyptilia eques Walsingham, 1891

Species of plume moth

Walsinghamiella eques is a moth of the family Pterophoridae. It is known from Ghana.
