= Walsinghamiella illustris =

Scientific classification
- Kingdom: Animalia
- Phylum: Arthropoda
- Class: Insecta
- Order: Lepidoptera
- Family: Pterophoridae
- Genus: Walsinghamiella
- Species: W. illustris

Binomial name
- Walsinghamiella illustris (Townsend, 1958)

Synonyms
- Platyptilia illustris Townsend, 1958

Species of plume moth

Walsinghamiella illustris is a moth of the family Pterophoridae. It is known from Kenya.
