= Titanoptilus melanodonta =

Scientific classification
- Kingdom: Animalia
- Phylum: Arthropoda
- Class: Insecta
- Order: Lepidoptera
- Family: Pterophoridae
- Genus: Titanoptilus
- Species: T. melanodonta

Binomial name
- Titanoptilus melanodonta Hampson, 1905

Species of plume moth

Titanoptilus melanodonta is a moth of the family Pterophoridae. It is known from Kenya.
