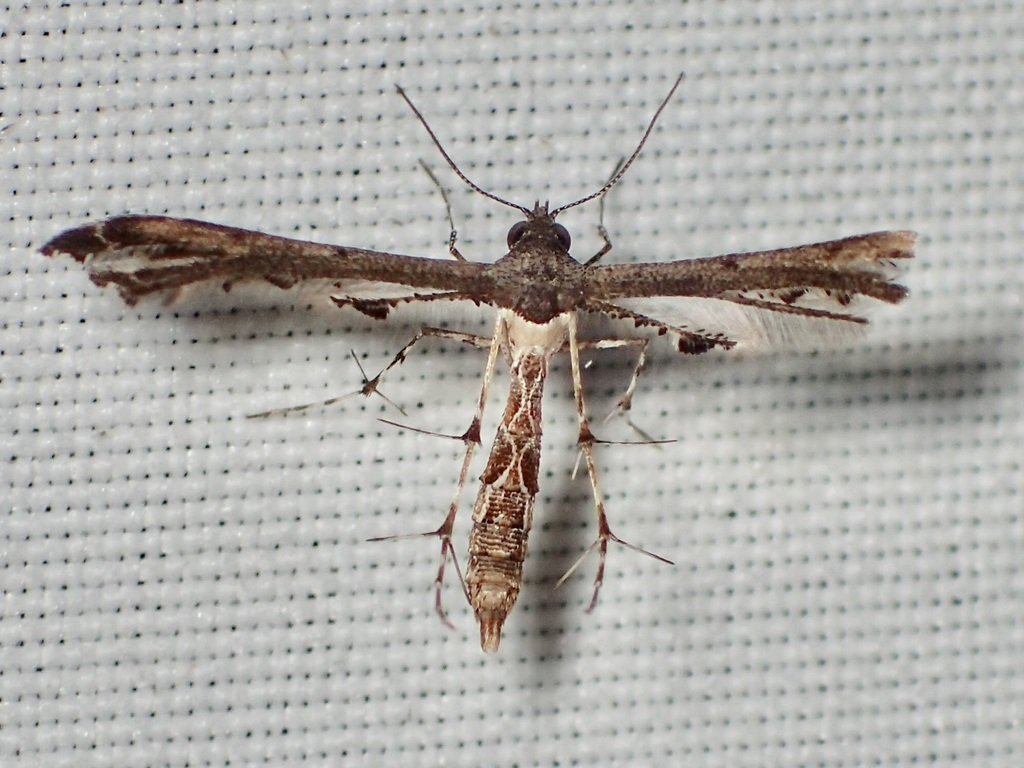

Scientific classification
- Kingdom: Animalia
- Phylum: Arthropoda
- Class: Insecta
- Order: Lepidoptera
- Family: Pterophoridae
- Genus: Michaelophorus
- Species: M. indentatus

Binomial name
- Michaelophorus indentatus (Meyrick, 1930)

Synonyms
- Oxyptilus indentatus (Meyrick, 1930)

= Michaelophorus indentatus =

Species of plume moth

Michaelophorus indentatus is a species of moth in the genus Michaelophorus known from Belize, Brazil, Mexico, and Panama. Moths of this species take flight in April and in September–November and have a wingspan of approximately 12 millimetres (0.47 in).
