= Paracapperia esuriens =

Scientific classification
- Kingdom: Animalia
- Phylum: Arthropoda
- Class: Insecta
- Order: Lepidoptera
- Family: Pterophoridae
- Genus: Paracapperia
- Species: P. esuriens

Binomial name
- Paracapperia esuriens (Meyrick, 1932)

Synonyms
- Oxyptilus esuriens Meyrick, 1932; Trichoptilus infernus Meyrick, 1939

Species of plume moth

Paracapperia esuriens is a moth of the family Pterophoridae that is known from Ethiopia, the Democratic Republic of the Congo and Angola.
