= Melanoptilia nigra =

Scientific classification
- Kingdom: Animalia
- Phylum: Arthropoda
- Class: Insecta
- Order: Lepidoptera
- Family: Pterophoridae
- Genus: Melanoptilia
- Species: M. nigra

Binomial name
- Melanoptilia nigra Gielis, 2006

Species of plume moth

Melanoptilia nigra is a moth of the family Pterophoridae. It is known from Ecuador.

The wingspan is about 14 mm. Adults are on wing in September and December.
