= Quadriptilia philorectis =

Scientific classification
- Kingdom: Animalia
- Phylum: Arthropoda
- Class: Insecta
- Order: Lepidoptera
- Family: Pterophoridae
- Genus: Quadriptilia
- Species: Q. philorectis

Binomial name
- Quadriptilia philorectis (Meyrick, 1926)

Synonyms
- Platyptilia philorectis Meyrick, 1926

Species of plume moth

Quadriptilia philorectis is a moth of the family Pterophoridae. It is known from Peru.

The wingspan is 39–41 mm. Adults are on wing in September.
