= Oirata nivella =

Scientific classification
- Kingdom: Animalia
- Phylum: Arthropoda
- Class: Insecta
- Order: Lepidoptera
- Family: Pterophoridae
- Genus: Oirata
- Species: O. nivella

Binomial name
- Oirata nivella (Ustjuzhanin, 2001)

Synonyms
- Merrifieldia nivella Ustjuzhanin, 2001

Species of plume moth

Oirata nivella is a moth of the family Pterophoridae.
