= Helpaphorus boby =

Scientific classification
- Kingdom: Animalia
- Phylum: Arthropoda
- Clade: Pancrustacea
- Class: Insecta
- Order: Lepidoptera
- Family: Pterophoridae
- Genus: Helpaphorus
- Species: H. boby

Binomial name
- Helpaphorus boby Gibeaux, 1994

Species of plume moth

Helpaphorus boby is a moth of the family Pterophoridae. It is known from Madagascar.
