= Melanoptilia chalcogastra =

Scientific classification
- Kingdom: Animalia
- Phylum: Arthropoda
- Class: Insecta
- Order: Lepidoptera
- Family: Pterophoridae
- Genus: Melanoptilia
- Species: M. chalcogastra

Binomial name
- Melanoptilia chalcogastra (Meyrick, 1921)

Synonyms
- Platyptilia chalcogastra Meyrick, 1921

Species of plume moth

Melanoptilia chalcogastra is a moth of the family Pterophoridae. It is known from British Guyana and Costa Rica.

The wingspan is 12–13 mm. Adults are on wing in March and July.
