= Vietteilus stenoptilioides =

Scientific classification
- Kingdom: Animalia
- Phylum: Arthropoda
- Clade: Pancrustacea
- Class: Insecta
- Order: Lepidoptera
- Family: Pterophoridae
- Genus: Vietteilus
- Species: V. stenoptilioides

Binomial name
- Vietteilus stenoptilioides Gibeaux, 1994

Species of plume moth

Vietteilus stenoptilioides is a moth of the family Pterophoridae that is known from Madagascar.
