= Asiaephorus longicucullus =

Scientific classification
- Domain: Eukaryota
- Kingdom: Animalia
- Phylum: Arthropoda
- Class: Insecta
- Order: Lepidoptera
- Family: Pterophoridae
- Genus: Asiaephorus
- Species: A. longicucullus

Binomial name
- Asiaephorus longicucullus Gielis, 2000

Species of plume moth

Asiaephorus longicucullus is a moth of the family Pterophoridae. It is known from Nepal, Japan (Kyushu, Honshu) and Assam.

The wingspan is 16–19 mm. Adults are on wing from May to October in Japan, in May in Nepal and in September in Assam.

The larvae feed on Salvia japonica and Scutellaria indica.
