= Leesi masoala =

Scientific classification
- Kingdom: Animalia
- Phylum: Arthropoda
- Clade: Pancrustacea
- Class: Insecta
- Order: Lepidoptera
- Family: Pterophoridae
- Tribe: Platyptiliini
- Genus: Leesi; Gibeaux, 1996
- Species: L. masoala

Binomial name
- Leesi masoala Gibeaux, 1996

Species of moth

Leesi is a monotypic moth genus in the family Pterophoridae described by Christian Gibeaux in 1996. Its only species, Leesi masoala, described by the same author in the same year, is known from Madagascar.
