= Parafuscoptilia =

Scientific classification
- Domain: Eukaryota
- Kingdom: Animalia
- Phylum: Arthropoda
- Class: Insecta
- Order: Lepidoptera
- Family: Pterophoridae
- Tribe: Marasmarchini
- Genus: Parafuscoptilia; Hao & Li, 2005
- Species: P. tubuliformis

Binomial name
- Parafuscoptilia tubuliformis Hao & Li, 2005

Monotypic genus of plume moths

Parafuscoptilia is a genus of moths in the family Pterophoridae, containing only one species, Parafuscoptilia tubuliformis. It was described in 2005 by Shu-Lian Hao and Hou-Hun Li from specimens collected in Fujian, China. It is placed to tribe Marasmarchini.

== Description ==
Adults of Parafuscoptilia tubuliformis have white forewings with a number of pale brown spots, hindwings that range in colour from greyish brown to greyish white, and a yellowish-white to ivory white head. The wingspan ranges from 11 to 14 mm.
