= Buszkoiana =

Scientific classification
- Kingdom: Animalia
- Phylum: Arthropoda
- Class: Insecta
- Order: Lepidoptera
- Family: Pterophoridae
- Tribe: Platyptiliini
- Genus: Buszkoiana; Koçak, 1981
- Species: B. capnodactylus

Binomial name
- Buszkoiana capnodactylus (Zeller, 1841)

Synonyms
- Pterophorus capnodactylus Zeller, 1841; Richardia capnodactylus; Platyptilia diversicilia Filipjev, 1931

Monotypic genus of plume moths

Buszkoiana is a genus of moths in the family Pterophoridae, containing only one species, Buszkoiana capnodactylus, which is known from Hungary, Poland, southern Germany, Denmark, the southern tip of the Netherlands, Belgium, Italy, Austria, the Czech Republic, Slovakia, Romania, Bulgaria, North Macedonia, Albania, Ukraine and southern Russia.

The moth is 18–24 mm for males and 22–27 mm for females.

The larvae feed on Petasites hybridus.

== Taxonomy ==
Buszkoiana is the replacement name for Richardia Buszko, 1978
