= Quadriptilia =

Scientific classification
- Kingdom: Animalia
- Phylum: Arthropoda
- Class: Insecta
- Order: Lepidoptera
- Family: Pterophoridae
- Tribe: Platyptiliini
- Genus: Quadriptilia; Gielis, 1994

Plume moth genus

Quadriptilia is a genus of moths in the family Pterophoridae.

== Species ==
- Quadriptilia obscurodactyla Gielis, 1994
- Quadriptilia philorectis (Meyrick, 1926)
- Quadriptilia rectangulodactyla Gielis, 1994
