= Uroloba =

Scientific classification
- Kingdom: Animalia
- Phylum: Arthropoda
- Class: Insecta
- Order: Lepidoptera
- Family: Pterophoridae
- Subfamily: Pterophorinae
- Tribe: Platyptiliini
- Genus: Uroloba; Walsingham, 1891

Type species
- Uroloba fuscicostata Walsingham, 1891

Plume moth genus

Uroloba is a genus of moths in the family Pterophoridae. It is found in Southern South America, and the type species is Uroloba fuscicostata.

== Species ==
It has two species:

- Uroloba calycospila (Meyrick, 1932)
- Uroloba fuscicostata (Walsingham, 1891)
