= Picardia =

Scientific classification
- Kingdom: Animalia
- Phylum: Arthropoda
- Clade: Pancrustacea
- Class: Insecta
- Order: Lepidoptera
- Family: Pterophoridae
- Tribe: Oidaematophorini
- Genus: Picardia; Gibeaux, 1994

Type species
- Pterophorus imerinae Bigot, 1964

Plume moth genus

Picardia is a genus of moths in the family Pterophoridae. The type species is Pterophorus imerinae by original designation, now a synonym of Picardia orchatias.

== Species ==
As of 2023, there are 13 species in this genus:

- Picardia andreikante Kovtunovich, Ustjuzhanin, Pototski & Haverinen, 2023
- Picardia bassi Ustjuzhanin & Kovtunovich, 2022
- Picardia betsileo Gibeaux, 1994
- Picardia bunga Ustjuzhanin & Kovtunovich, 2022
- Picardia delospilus (Meyrick, 1921)
- Picardia eparches (Meyrick, 1931)
- Picardia leza Kovtunovich & Ustjuzhanin, 2014
- Picardia negus (Gibeaux, 1994)
- Picardia orchatias (Meyrick, 1908)
- Picardia raymondi Kovtunovich & Ustjuzhanin, 2014
- Picardia ruwenzoricus (Gielis, 1991)
- Picardia tropeki Ustjuzhanin & Kovtunovich, 2022
- Picardia tumbuka Kovtunovich & Ustjuzhanin, 2014
