= Bigotilia =

Scientific classification
- Kingdom: Animalia
- Phylum: Arthropoda
- Clade: Pancrustacea
- Class: Insecta
- Order: Lepidoptera
- Family: Pterophoridae
- Subfamily: Pterophorinae
- Tribe: Platyptiliini
- Genus: Bigotilia; Gibeaux, 1994

Plume moth genus

Bigotilia is a genus of moths in the family Pterophoridae.

== Species ==
- Bigotilia centralis (Bigot, 1964)
- Bigotilia montana Gibeaux, 1994
