= Oirata (moth) =

Scientific classification
- Kingdom: Animalia
- Phylum: Arthropoda
- Clade: Pancrustacea
- Class: Insecta
- Order: Lepidoptera
- Family: Pterophoridae
- Tribe: Pterophorini
- Genus: Oirata; Ustjuzhanin & Kovtunovich, 2002

Plume moth genus

Oirata is a genus of moths in the family Pterophoridae.

== Species ==
- Oirata nivella (Ustjuzhanin, 2001)
- Oirata poculidactyla (K. Nupponen & T. Nupponen, 2001)
- Oirata taklamakanus (Arenberger, 1995)
