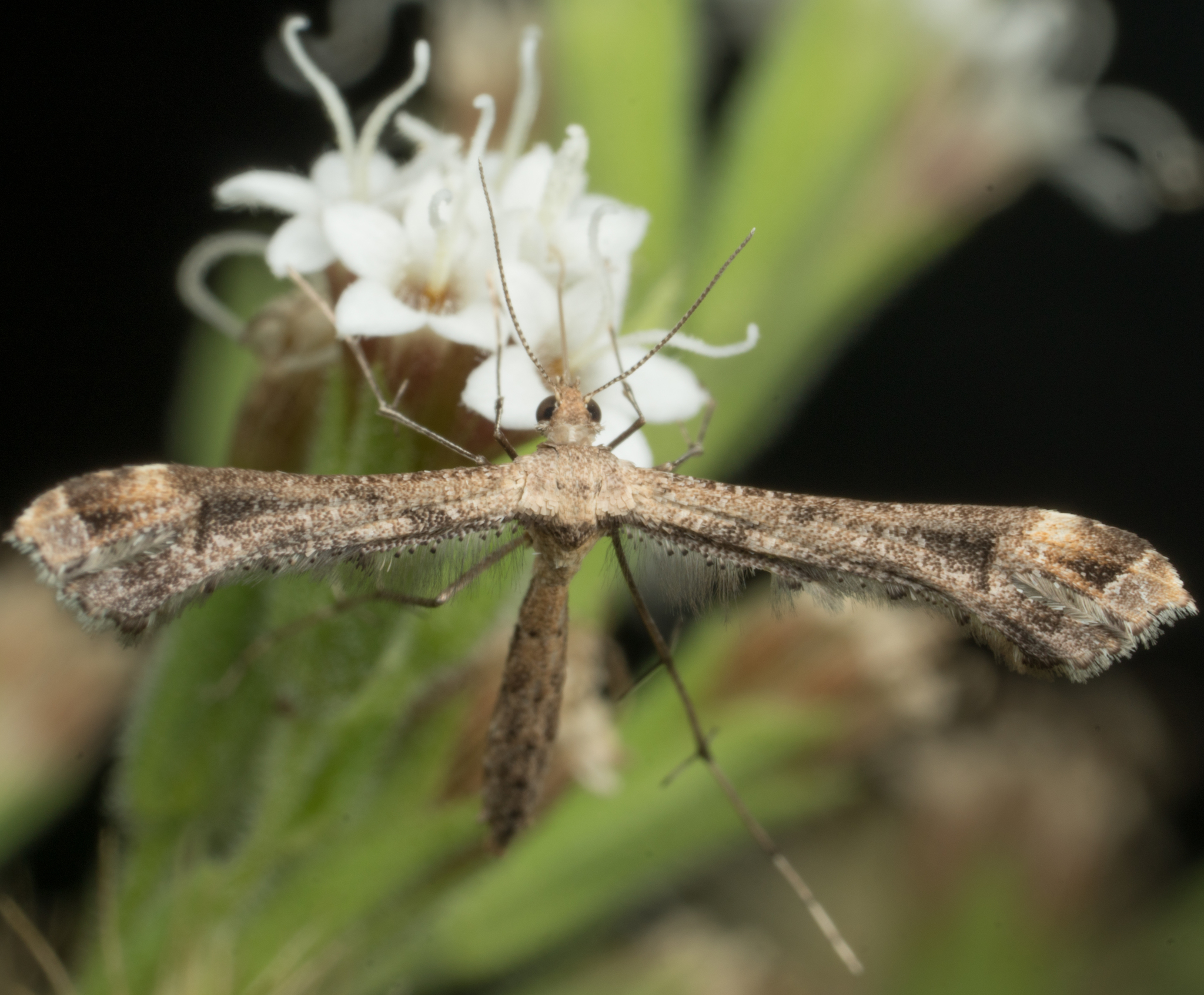

Scientific classification
- Kingdom: Animalia
- Phylum: Arthropoda
- Class: Insecta
- Order: Lepidoptera
- Family: Pterophoridae
- Genus: Stenoptilodes
- Species: S. antirrhina

Binomial name
- Stenoptilodes antirrhina (Lange, 1940)

Synonyms
- Platyptilia antirrhina Lange, 1940

= Stenoptilodes antirrhina =

Species of plume moth

Stenoptilodes antirrhina, the snapdragon plume moth, is a moth of the family Pterophoridae. It is known from California in the United States, but also from greenhouses in the south-eastern U.S. that have received cuttings of snapdragon from California.

The wingspan is 15–25 mm.

The larvae feed on Antirrhinum species (including Antirrhinum majus), as well as Pelargonium x hortorum.
