= Apoxyptilus =

Scientific classification
- Kingdom: Animalia
- Phylum: Arthropoda
- Class: Insecta
- Order: Lepidoptera
- Family: Pterophoridae
- Tribe: Oxyptilini
- Genus: Apoxyptilus; Alipanah et al., 2010

Type species
- Apoxyptilus anthites (Meyrick, 1936)

Plume moth genus

Apoxyptilus is a genus of moths in the family Pterophoridae containing only three species:

- Apoxyptilus anthites (Meyrick, 1936), which is known from Kenya, South Africa, Tanzania and Uganda
- Apoxyptilus steineri Gielis, 2011 (from Madagascar)
- Apoxyptilus uzumarus Kovtunovich & Ustjuzhanin, 2014 (from Malawi)

== Etymology ==
The generic name indicates that this genus not closely related to Oxyptilus.
