= Helpaphorus =

Scientific classification
- Kingdom: Animalia
- Phylum: Arthropoda
- Clade: Pancrustacea
- Class: Insecta
- Order: Lepidoptera
- Family: Pterophoridae
- Tribe: Oidaematophorini
- Genus: Helpaphorus; Gibeaux, 1994

Plume moth genus

Helpaphorus is a genus of moths in the family Pterophoridae.

== Species ==
- Helpaphorus boby Gibeaux, 1994
- Helpaphorus festivus (Bigot, 1964)
- Helpaphorus griveaudi (Bigot, 1964)
- Helpaphorus imaitso Gibeaux, 1994
- Helpaphorus testaceus Gibeaux, 1994
