= Platyptiliodes =

Scientific classification
- Kingdom: Animalia
- Phylum: Arthropoda
- Class: Insecta
- Order: Lepidoptera
- Family: Pterophoridae
- Tribe: Platyptiliini
- Genus: Platyptiliodes; Strand, 1913
- Species: P. albisignatula

Binomial name
- Platyptiliodes albisignatula (Strand, 1913)

Synonyms
- Platyptilia albisignatula Strand, 1913

Monotypic genus of plume moths

Platyptiliodes is a genus of moths of the family Pterophoridae containing only one species, Platyptiliodes albisignatula, which is known from Equatorial Guinea.
