= Vietteilus =

Scientific classification
- Kingdom: Animalia
- Phylum: Arthropoda
- Clade: Pancrustacea
- Class: Insecta
- Order: Lepidoptera
- Family: Pterophoridae
- Subfamily: Pterophorinae
- Tribe: Platyptiliini
- Genus: Vietteilus; Gibeaux, 1994

Plume moth genus

Vietteilus is a genus of moths in the family Pterophoridae endemic to Africa.

== Species ==
- Vietteilus borbonica (Viette, 1957)
- Vietteilus stenoptilioides Gibeaux, 1994
- Vietteilus vigens (Felder, Rogenhofer, 1875)
