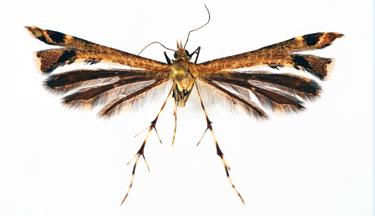

Scientific classification
- Kingdom: Animalia
- Phylum: Arthropoda
- Class: Insecta
- Order: Lepidoptera
- Family: Pterophoridae
- Genus: Eucapperia
- Species: E. bullifera

Binomial name
- Eucapperia bullifera (Meyrick, 1918)

Synonyms
- Platyptilia bullifera Meyrick, 1918; Eucapperia continentalis Gielis, 2008; Lantanophaga longiductus Gibeaux, 1992; Eucapperia longiductus

= Eucapperia bullifera =

Species of plume moth

Eucapperia bullifera is a moth of the family Pterophoroidea. It is found in Tanzania, South Africa and Madagascar.

The wingspan is 14–19 mm. The moth flies in November.
