= Setosipennula =

Scientific classification
- Kingdom: Animalia
- Phylum: Arthropoda
- Clade: Pancrustacea
- Class: Insecta
- Order: Lepidoptera
- Family: Pterophoridae
- Tribe: Oidaematophorini
- Genus: Setosipennula; Gibeaux, 1994
- Species: S. viettei

Binomial name
- Setosipennula viettei Gibeaux, 1994

Monotypic genus of plume moths

Setosipennula is a genus of moths in the family Pterophoridae containing only one species, Setosipennula viettei, which is known from Madagascar.
