= Michaelophorus =

Scientific classification
- Domain: Eukaryota
- Kingdom: Animalia
- Phylum: Arthropoda
- Class: Insecta
- Order: Lepidoptera
- Family: Pterophoridae
- Subfamily: Pterophorinae
- Tribe: Platyptiliini
- Genus: Michaelophorus; Gielis, 1999

Synonyms
- Michaelophorus is the replacement name for Schafferia Gielis, 1993

Plume moth genus

Michaelophorus is a genus of moths in the family Pterophoridae. Species in this genus are distributed in regions with neotropical climates. Little is known about the genus' overall ecology.

== Species ==
- Michaelophorus nubilus (type)
- Michaelophorus bahiaensis
- Michaelophorus dentiger
- Michaelophorus hodgesi
- Michaelophorus indentatus
- Michaelophorus margaritae
- Michaelophorus shafferi
