= Imbophorus =

Scientific classification
- Kingdom: Animalia
- Phylum: Arthropoda
- Class: Insecta
- Order: Lepidoptera
- Family: Pterophoridae
- Subfamily: Pterophorinae
- Tribe: Pterophorini
- Genus: Imbophorus; Arenberger, 1991

Plume moth genus

Imbophorus is a genus of moths in the family Pterophoridae. It is endemic to Australia.

== Species ==
As of version 1.1.23.125, the Catalogue of the Pterophoroidea of the World lists the following species for genus Imbophorus:

- Imbophorus aptalis (Walker, 1864)
- Imbophorus leucophasmus (Turner, 1911)
- Imbophorus pallidus Arenberger, 1991
