= Paraamblyptilia =

Scientific classification
- Kingdom: Animalia
- Phylum: Arthropoda
- Class: Insecta
- Order: Lepidoptera
- Family: Pterophoridae
- Tribe: Platyptiliini
- Genus: Paraamblyptilia; Gielis, 1991

Plume moth genus

Paraamblyptilia is a genus of moths in the family Pterophoridae.

== Species ==
- Paraamblyptilia eutalanta (Meyrick, 1931)
- Paraamblyptilia ridouti Gielis, 1996
