= Melanoptilia =

Scientific classification
- Kingdom: Animalia
- Phylum: Arthropoda
- Class: Insecta
- Order: Lepidoptera
- Family: Pterophoridae
- Subfamily: Pterophorinae
- Genus: Melanoptilia; Gielis, 2006

Plume moth genus

Melanoptilia is a genus of moths in the family Pterophoridae described by Cees Gielis in 2006. All described species come from Latin America.

== Species ==
- Melanoptilia arsenica (Meyrick, 1921)
- Melanoptilia nigra Gielis, 2006
- Melanoptilia chalcogastra (Meyrick, 1921)
- Melanoptilia haemogastra (Meyrick, 1926)
