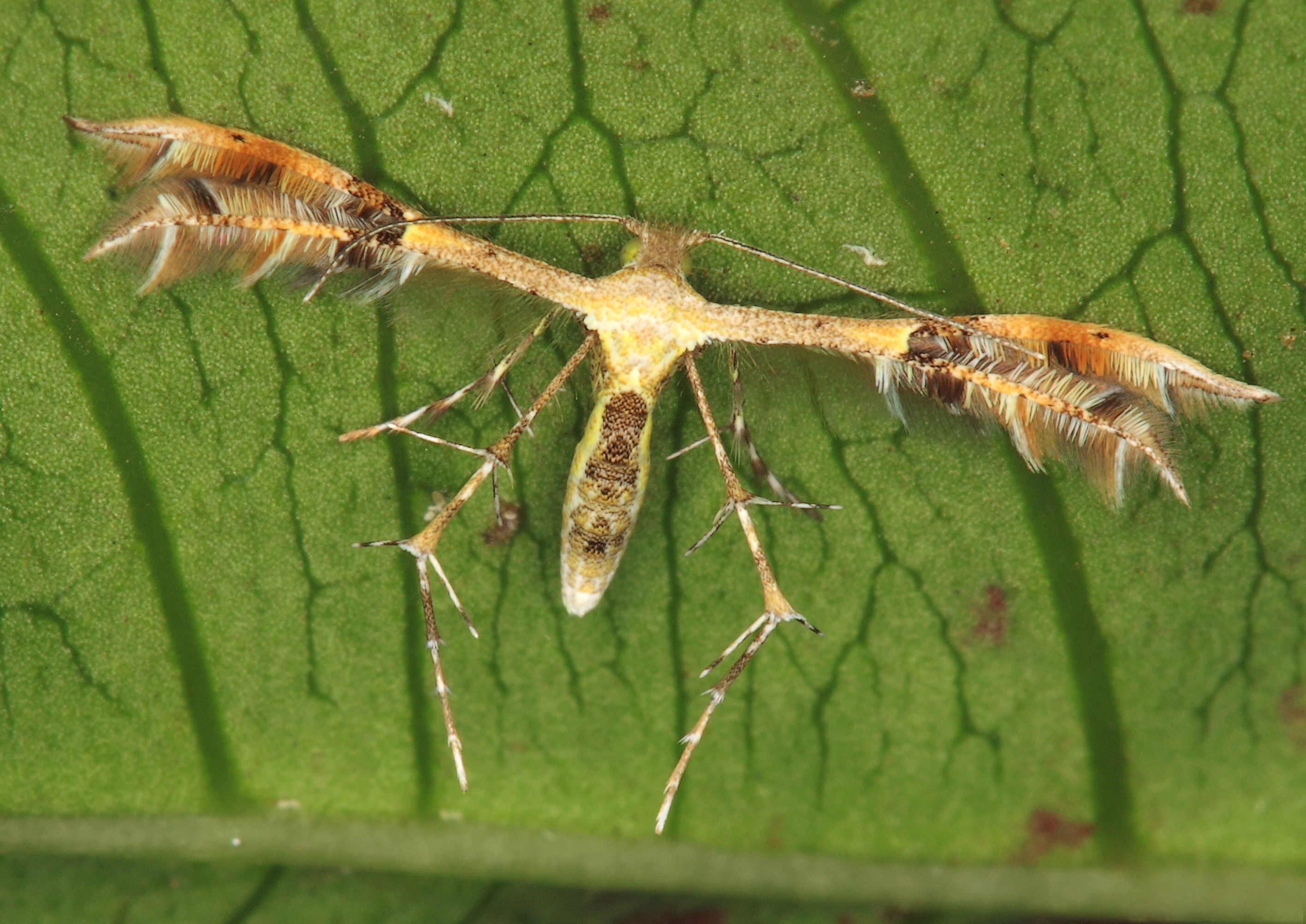
- Diacrotricha fasciola

Scientific classification
- Domain: Eukaryota
- Kingdom: Animalia
- Phylum: Arthropoda
- Class: Insecta
- Order: Lepidoptera
- Family: Pterophoridae
- Tribe: Pterophorini
- Genus: Diacrotricha; Zeller, 1852

= Diacrotricha =

Plume moth genus

Diacrotricha is a genus of moths in the family Pterophoridae.

== Species ==
As of version 1.1.23.125, the Catalogue of the Pterophoroidea of the World lists the following species for genus Diacrotricha:

- Diacrotricha fasciola Zeller, 1852
- Diacrotricha guttuligera Diakonoff, 1952
