= Imbophorus pallidus =

Scientific classification
- Kingdom: Animalia
- Phylum: Arthropoda
- Class: Insecta
- Order: Lepidoptera
- Family: Pterophoridae
- Genus: Imbophorus
- Species: I. pallidus

Binomial name
- Imbophorus pallidus Arenberger, 1991

Species of plume moth

Imbophorus pallidus is a species of moth of the family Pterophoridae. It is found in Australia.
