= Imbophorus leucophasmus =

Scientific classification
- Kingdom: Animalia
- Phylum: Arthropoda
- Class: Insecta
- Order: Lepidoptera
- Family: Pterophoridae
- Genus: Imbophorus
- Species: I. leucophasmus

Binomial name
- Imbophorus leucophasmus Turner, 1911

Synonyms
- Imbophorus leucophasma

Species of plume moth

Imbophorus leucophasmus is a species of moth of the family Pterophoridae. It is found in Australia, where it is known from Queensland and New South Wales.

Adults have off-white wings with variable brown markings, and a wingspan of 15–18 mm.
