= Paracapperia =

Scientific classification
- Kingdom: Animalia
- Phylum: Arthropoda
- Clade: Pancrustacea
- Class: Insecta
- Order: Lepidoptera
- Family: Pterophoridae
- Tribe: Oxyptilini
- Genus: Paracapperia; Bigot & Picard, 1986

Plume moth genus

Paracapperia is a genus of moths in the family Pterophoridae.

== Species ==
- Paracapperia anatolicus (Caradja, 1920)
- Paracapperia esuriens (Meyrick, 1932)
