= Asiaephorus =

Scientific classification
- Kingdom: Animalia
- Phylum: Arthropoda
- Class: Insecta
- Order: Lepidoptera
- Family: Pterophoridae
- Subfamily: Pterophorinae
- Tribe: Platyptiliini
- Genus: Asiaephorus; Gielis, 2000

Plume moth genus

Asiaephorus is a genus of moths in the family Pterophoridae.

== Species ==
- Asiaephorus extremus Gielis, 2003
- Asiaephorus longicucullus Gielis, 2000
- Asiaephorus narada Kovtunovich & Ustyuzhanin 2003
- Asiaephorus sythoffi (Snellen, 1903)
