= Heptaloba =

Scientific classification
- Domain: Eukaryota
- Kingdom: Animalia
- Phylum: Arthropoda
- Class: Insecta
- Order: Lepidoptera
- Family: Pterophoridae
- Genus: Heptaloba; Walsingham, 1885

Plume moth genus

Heptaloba is a genus of moths in the family Pterophoridae.

== Species ==
As of version 1.1.23.125, the Catalogue of the Pterophoroidea of the World lists the following species for genus Heptaloba:

- Heptaloba argyriodactylus (Walker, 1864)
- Heptaloba tanglong Ustjuzhanin & Kovtunovich, 2010
