= Pseudoxyptilus =

Scientific classification
- Kingdom: Animalia
- Phylum: Arthropoda
- Class: Insecta
- Order: Lepidoptera
- Family: Pterophoridae
- Tribe: Oxyptilini
- Genus: Pseudoxyptilus; Alipanah et al., 2010
- Species: P. secutor

Binomial name
- Pseudoxyptilus secutor (Meyrick, 1911)

Synonyms
- Oxyptilus secutor Meyrick, 1911

Monotypic genus of plume moths

Pseudoxyptilus is a genus of moths in the family Pterophoridae containing only one species, Pseudoxyptilus secutor, which is known from South Africa.

The wingspan is 17–19 mm.
