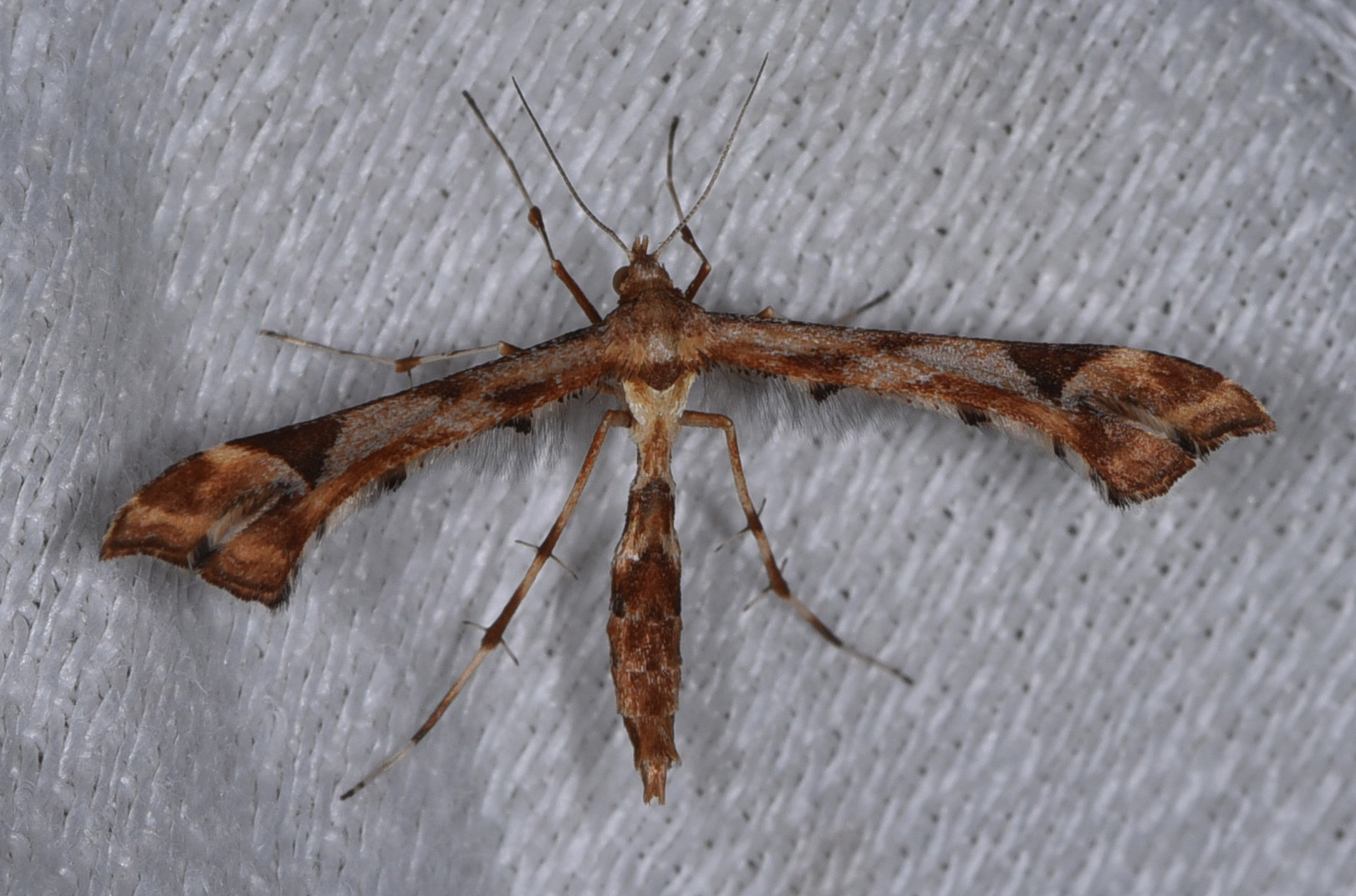

Scientific classification
- Kingdom: Animalia
- Phylum: Arthropoda
- Clade: Pancrustacea
- Class: Insecta
- Order: Lepidoptera
- Family: Pterophoridae
- Genus: Platyptilia
- Species: P. carduidactyla

Binomial name
- Platyptilia carduidactyla (Riley, 1869)

Synonyms
- Platyptilia carduidactylus (Riley, 1869); Pterophorus carduidactylus Riley, 1869; Platyptilia cardui Zeller, 1873; Platyptilia hesperis Grinnell, 1908

= Platyptilia carduidactyla =

Artichoke plume moth

Species of plume moth

Platyptilia carduidactyla, the artichoke plume moth, is a moth of the family Pterophoridae described by Riley in 1869. It is found in New Zealand and North America, from Mexico north into the United States.

The wingspan is 19–32 mm. Adults are on wing in July in Mexico and from May to September further north.

The larvae feed on Arctium, Carduus, Cirsium, Cynara and Silybum species. They are a pest of Cynara scolymus. The females lay their eggs on the bottom side of artichoke plants. The caterpillars can cause considerable damage.
