= Stockophorus =

Scientific classification
- Kingdom: Animalia
- Phylum: Arthropoda
- Class: Insecta
- Order: Lepidoptera
- Family: Pterophoridae
- Tribe: Platyptiliini
- Genus: Stockophorus; Gielis, 1993
- Species: S. charitopa

Binomial name
- Stockophorus charitopa (Meyrick, 1908)

Synonyms
- Platyptilia charitopa Meyrick, 1908

Monotypic genus of plume moths

Stockophorus charitopa is a moth of the family Pterophoridae and the only member of the genus Stockophorus. It is known from Bolivia.

The wingspan is about 14 mm. Adults are on wing in September.
