= Intercapperia =

Scientific classification
- Kingdom: Animalia
- Phylum: Arthropoda
- Class: Insecta
- Order: Lepidoptera
- Family: Pterophoridae
- Tribe: Oxyptilini
- Genus: Intercapperia; Arenberger, 1988
- Species: I. scindia

Binomial name
- Intercapperia scindia Arenberger, 1988

Monotypic genus of plume moths

Intercapperia is a genus of moths in the family Pterophoridae containing only one species, Intercapperia scindia, which is only known from the Scinde Valley in Kashmir. The wingspan is 16–20 millimetres (0.63–0.79 in). Adults have been recorded from June to August.
