= Titanoptilus =

Scientific classification
- Kingdom: Animalia
- Phylum: Arthropoda
- Class: Insecta
- Order: Lepidoptera
- Family: Pterophoridae
- Subfamily: Pterophorinae
- Genus: Titanoptilus; Hampson, 1905

Synonyms
- Macrotinactis Meyrick, 1912

Plume moth genus

Titanoptilus is a genus of moths in the family Pterophoridae. It was described by George Hampson in 1905.

== Species ==
As of version 1.1.23.125, the Catalogue of the Pterophoroidea of the World lists the following species for genus Titanoptilus:

- Titanoptilus melanodonta Hampson, 1905 (type)
- Titanoptilus procerus Bigot, 1969
- Titanoptilus rufus Gibeaux, 1994
- Titanoptilus serrulatus Meyrick, 1935
- Titanoptilus stenodactylus (T. B. Fletcher, 1911) (=Titanoptilus laniger Bigot, 1969 and Titanoptilus patellatus Meyrick, 1913)
