= Arcoptilia =

Scientific classification
- Kingdom: Animalia
- Phylum: Arthropoda
- Class: Insecta
- Order: Lepidoptera
- Family: Pterophoridae
- Subfamily: Pterophorinae
- Tribe: Marasmarchini
- Genus: Arcoptilia; Arenberger, 1985

Plume moth genus

Arcoptilia is a genus of moths in the family Pterophoridae.

== Species ==
As of version 1.1.23.125, the Catalogue of the Pterophoroidea of the World lists the following species for genus Arcoptilia:

- Arcoptilia gizan Arenberger, 1985
- Arcoptilia malawica Kovtunovich & Ustjuzhanin, 2014
- Arcoptilia naumanni Ustjuzhanin & Kovtunovich, 2015
- Arcoptilia pongola Ustjuzhanin et Kovtunovich, 2010
