= Crassuncus =

Scientific classification
- Kingdom: Animalia
- Phylum: Arthropoda
- Clade: Pancrustacea
- Class: Insecta
- Order: Lepidoptera
- Family: Pterophoridae
- Tribe: Oidaematophorini
- Genus: Crassuncus; Gibeaux, 1994

Plume moth genus

Crassuncus is an Afrotropical genus of moths in the family Pterophoridae.

== Taxonomy ==
The genus was erected by C. Gibeaux in 1994 and is currently assigned to tribe Oidaematophorini. Several of its species were originally described in genus Pterophorus.

== Distribution ==
The genus has an Afrotropical distribution, with species recorded from Ethiopia, Kenya, Uganda, Tanzania, the Democratic Republic of the Congo, Malawi, Swaziland, Zimbabwe, South Africa and on Madagascar.

== Species ==
As of version 1.1.23.125, the Catalogue of the Pterophoroidea of the World lists the following species for genus Crassuncus:

- Crassuncus colubratus (Meyrick, 1909)
- Crassuncus defectus (Bigot & Luquet, 1991)
- Crassuncus ecstaticus (Meyrick, 1932)
- Crassuncus ermakovae Kovtunovich & Ustjuzhanin, 2017
- Crassuncus hawkingi Ustjuzhanin & Kovtunovich, 2016
- Crassuncus kenzo Kovtunovich & Ustjuzhanin, 2017
- Crassuncus koperbergi Ustjuzhanin & Kovtunovich, 2016
- Crassuncus livingstoni Kovtunovich & Ustjuzhanin, 2014
- Crassuncus orophilus Gibeaux, 1994
- Crassuncus pacifica (Meyrick, 1911)
- Crassuncus pseudolaudatus (Gibeaux, 1992)
- Crassuncus timidus (Meyrick, 1908)
- Crassuncus tripunctatus (Walsingham, 1881)
