= Fuscoptilia =

Scientific classification
- Kingdom: Animalia
- Phylum: Arthropoda
- Class: Insecta
- Order: Lepidoptera
- Family: Pterophoridae
- Subfamily: Pterophorinae
- Tribe: Marasmarchini
- Genus: Fuscoptilia; Arenberger, 1991

Synonyms
- Snellenia Ustjuzhanin, 1996

Plume moth genus

Fuscoptilia is a genus of moths in the family Pterophoridae.

== Species ==
As of version 1.1.23.125, the Catalogue of the Pterophoroidea of the World lists the following three species for the genus:

- Fuscoptilia emarginatus (Snellen, 1884)
- Fuscoptilia jarosi Arenberger, 1991
- Fuscoptilia sinuata (Qin & Zheng, 1997)
