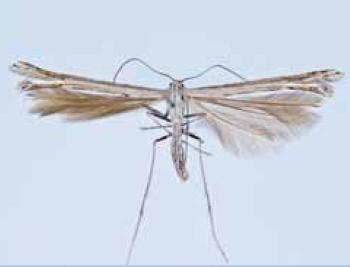

Scientific classification
- Kingdom: Animalia
- Phylum: Arthropoda
- Class: Insecta
- Order: Lepidoptera
- Family: Pterophoridae
- Tribe: Pterophorini
- Genus: Patagonophorus; Gielis, 1991
- Species: P. murinus

Binomial name
- Patagonophorus murinus Gielis, 1991

= Patagonophorus =

Monotypic genus of plume moths

Patagonophorus is a genus of moths in the family Pterophoridae containing only one species, Patagonophorus murinus, which is known from Argentina and Chile.
