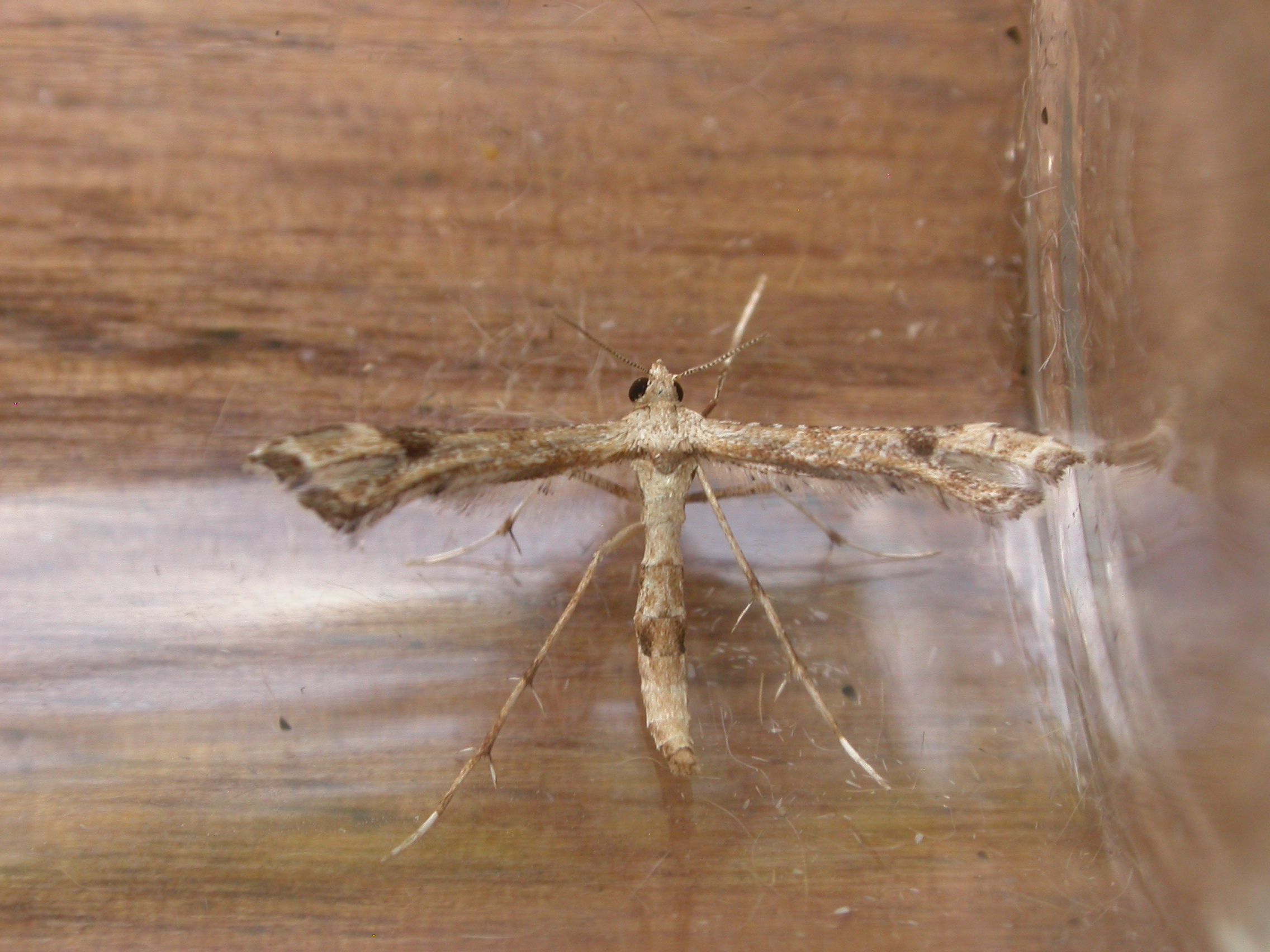
- Lantanophaga pusillidactylus

Scientific classification
- Kingdom: Animalia
- Phylum: Arthropoda
- Class: Insecta
- Order: Lepidoptera
- Family: Pterophoridae
- Subfamily: Pterophorinae
- Tribe: Platyptiliini
- Genus: Lantanophaga; Zimmerman, 1958

= Lantanophaga =

Plume moth genus

Lantanophaga is a genus of moths in the family Pterophoridae. This genus was first described by Elwood Zimmerman in 1958.

== Species ==
- Lantanophaga anellatus Rose and Pooni, 2003
- Lantanophaga dubitationis Gielis & de Vos, 2006
- Lantanophaga minima (B. Landry & Gielis, 1992)
- Lantanophaga pusillidactyla (Walker, 1864)
