= Koremaguia =

Scientific classification
- Kingdom: Animalia
- Phylum: Arthropoda
- Class: Insecta
- Order: Lepidoptera
- Family: Pterophoridae
- Tribe: Platyptiliini
- Genus: Koremaguia; Hampson, 1891
- Species: K. alticola

Binomial name
- Koremaguia alticola (Felder & Rogenhofer, 1875)

Synonyms
- Cnemidophorus alticola Felder & Rogenhofer, 1875; Koremaguia aurantidactylus Hampson, 1891

Monotypic genus of plume moth

Koremaguia is a genus of moths in the family Pterophoridae containing only one species, Koremaguia alticola, which is found in India (the Andaman Islands).
