= Singularia =

Scientific classification
- Kingdom: Animalia
- Phylum: Arthropoda
- Class: Insecta
- Order: Lepidoptera
- Family: Pterophoridae
- Tribe: Pterophorini
- Genus: Singularia; Arenberger, 1988

Synonyms
- Chocophorus Gielis & Matthews-Lott, 1994

Plume moth genus

Singularia is a genus of moths in the family Pterophoridae. It includes all species formerly placed in the genus Chocophorus and five new species described in 2016.

== Species ==
- Singularia alternaria (Zeller, 1874)
- Singularia brechlini Kovtunovich & Ustjuzhanin, 2016
- Singularia carabayus (Arenberger, 1990)
- Singularia guajiro Kovtunovich & Ustjuzhanin, 2016
- Singularia leptochorda (Meyrick, 1913)
- Singularia lesya Kovtunovich & Ustjuzhanin, 2016
- Singularia mayaensis (Gielis, 2011)
- Singularia sinjaevi Kovtunovich & Ustjuzhanin, 2016
- Singularia solisi (Gielis & Matthews-Lott, 1994)
- Singularia tolima Kovtunovich & Ustjuzhanin, 2016
- Singularia venedictoffi (Gielis & Matthews-Lott, 1994)
- Singularia walsinghami (Fernald, 1898)
