= Sochchora =

Scientific classification
- Kingdom: Animalia
- Phylum: Arthropoda
- Class: Insecta
- Order: Lepidoptera
- Family: Pterophoridae
- Tribe: Platyptiliini
- Genus: Sochchora; Walker, 1864

Plume moth genus

Sochchora is a genus of moths in the family Pterophoridae described by Francis Walker in 1864.

== Species ==
- Sochchora albipunctella T. B. Fletcher, 1911
- Sochchora donatella Walker, 1864
- Sochchora dotina Walsingham, 1915
- Sochchora mulinus Gielis, 2006
