= Crocydoscelus =

Scientific classification
- Kingdom: Animalia
- Phylum: Arthropoda
- Class: Insecta
- Order: Lepidoptera
- Family: Pterophoridae
- Tribe: Platyptiliini
- Genus: Crocydoscelus; Walsingham, 1897
- Species: C. ferrugineum

Binomial name
- Crocydoscelus ferrugineum Walsingham, 1897

Monotypic genus of plume moths

Crocydoscelus is a genus of moths in the family Pterophoridae containing one species, Crocydoscelus ferrugineum, which is known from the Republic of Congo and Nigeria.
