= Walsinghamiella =

Scientific classification
- Kingdom: Animalia
- Phylum: Arthropoda
- Class: Insecta
- Order: Lepidoptera
- Family: Pterophoridae
- Subfamily: Pterophorinae
- Tribe: Tetraschalini
- Genus: Walsinghamiella; Berg, 1898

Synonyms
- Gilbertia Walsingham, 1891

Plume moth genus

Walsinghamiella is a genus of moths in the family Pterophoridae.

== Species ==
As of version 1.1.23.125, the Catalogue of the Pterophoroidea of the World lists the following species for genus Walsinghamiella:

- Walsinghamiella eques (Walsingham, 1891)
- Walsinghamiella illustris (Townsend, 1958)
- Walsinghamiella leifi Gielis, 2011
- Walsinghamiella niniella Gielis, 2011
- Walsinghamiella orichalcias (Meyrick, 1916)
- Walsinghamiella peterseni Gielis, 2011
- Walsinghamiella prolai (Gibeaux, 1994)
- Walsinghamiella vibrans (Meyrick, 1921)
