= Tomotilus =

Scientific classification
- Kingdom: Animalia
- Phylum: Arthropoda
- Class: Insecta
- Order: Lepidoptera
- Family: Pterophoridae
- Genus: Tomotilus; Yano, 1961
- Species: T. celebratus

Binomial name
- Tomotilus celebratus (Meyrick, 1932)

Synonyms
- Oxyptilus celebratus (Meyrick, 1932); Tomotilus saitoi Yano, 1961; Tomotilus celebrates (misspelling in Kim et al., 2012)

Species of plume moth

Tomotilus celebratus is a moth of the family Pterophoridae. It has been reported from Australia, India, Japan (including Honshu) and Indonesia (Java). Until recently the species was known as Tomotilus saitoi, but the earlier name Oxyptilus celebratus has been recognised as an earlier reference to this same species.

The length of the forewings is 6–8 mm.

The larvae feed on Dunbaria villosa.
