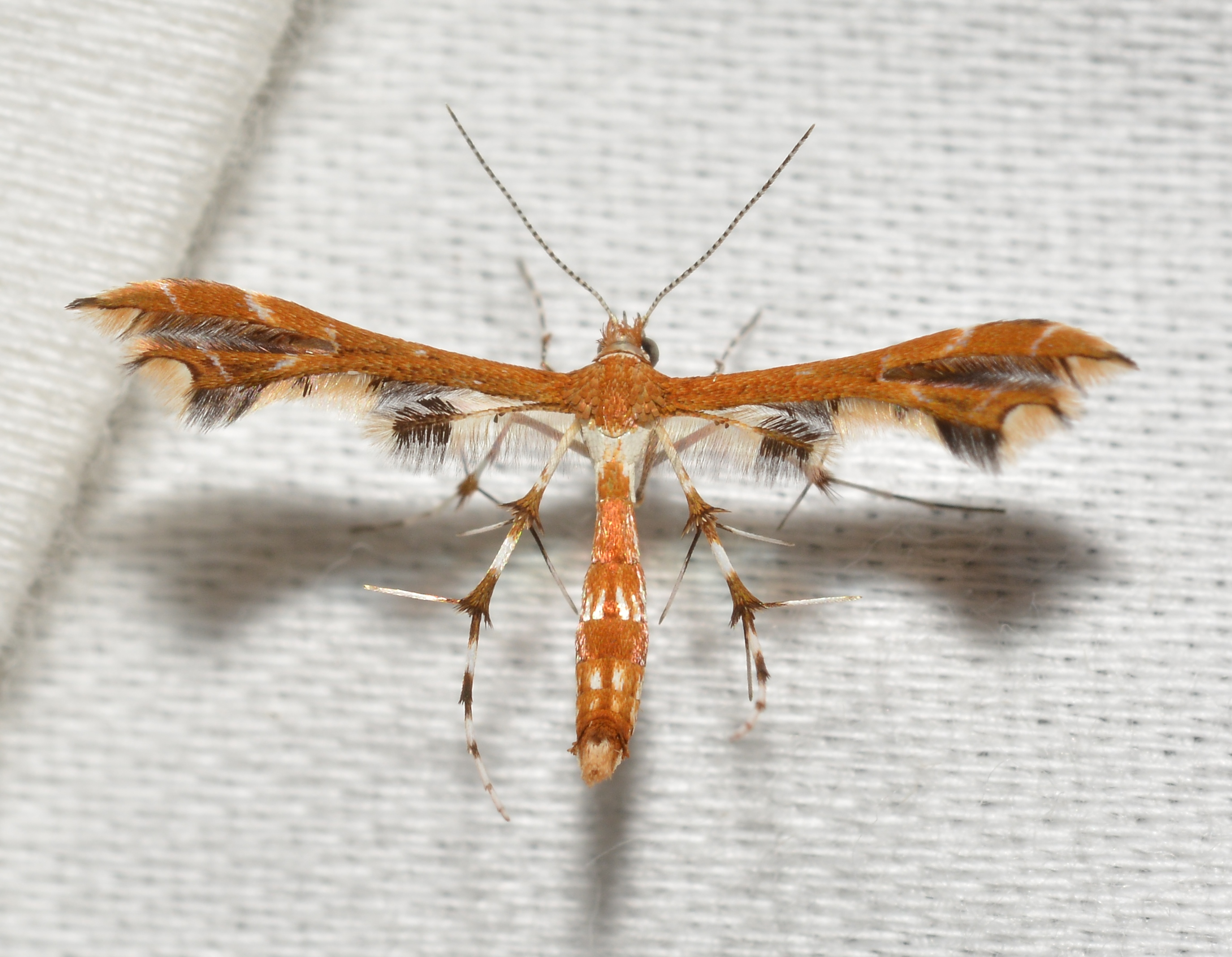

Scientific classification
- Kingdom: Animalia
- Phylum: Arthropoda
- Clade: Pancrustacea
- Class: Insecta
- Order: Lepidoptera
- Family: Pterophoridae
- Genus: Geina
- Species: G. buscki

Binomial name
- Geina buscki (McDunnough, 1933)

Synonyms
- Pterophorus buscki McDunnough, 1933

= Geina buscki =

Species of plume moth

Geina buscki is a moth of the family Pterophoridae. It known from Southeast Canada and Eastern United States, including Tennessee and Mississippi.

The wingspan is about 15 mm. The shape and the way it holds its wings giving it the shape of a narrow winged airplane.

Bucks Plume avoids a crab spider
