= Prichotilus bidens =

Scientific classification
- Kingdom: Animalia
- Phylum: Arthropoda
- Clade: Pancrustacea
- Class: Insecta
- Order: Lepidoptera
- Family: Pterophoridae
- Genus: Prichotilus
- Species: P. bidens

Binomial name
- Prichotilus bidens (Meyrick, 1930)

Synonyms
- Trichoptilus bidens Meyrick, 1930

Species of plume moth

Prichotilus bidens is a moth of the family Pterophoridae. It is known from the Khasi Hills of India.

The wingspan is 10–11 mm.
