= Septuaginta zagulajevi =

Septuaginta

Scientific classification
- Domain: Eukaryota
- Kingdom: Animalia
- Phylum: Arthropoda
- Class: Insecta
- Order: Lepidoptera
- Family: Pterophoridae
- Genus: Septuaginta; Ustjuzhanin, 1996
- Species: S. zagulajevi

Binomial name
- Septuaginta zagulajevi Ustjuzhanin, 1996

Species of plume moth

Septuaginta is a genus of moths in the family Pterophoridae containing only one species, Septuaginta zagulajevi, which is found in Russia (the Chita region in Siberia).

== See also ==
- Septuagint (disambiguation)
