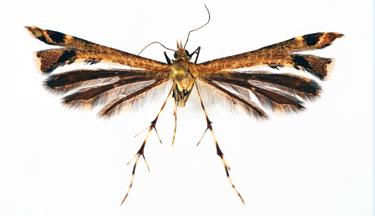
- Eucapperia continentalis

Scientific classification
- Kingdom: Animalia
- Phylum: Arthropoda
- Clade: Pancrustacea
- Class: Insecta
- Order: Lepidoptera
- Family: Pterophoridae
- Subfamily: Pterophorinae
- Tribe: Oxyptilini; Bigot, Gibeaux, Nel & Picard, 1998

= Oxyptilini =

Plume moth tribe in subfamily Pterophorinae

Oxyptilini is a tribe within the subfamily Pterophorinae of the plume moths or Pterophoridae. The monophyly of this group was established in a 2011 phylogenetic study. A key to distinguish the genera within this tribe was published in 2010.
