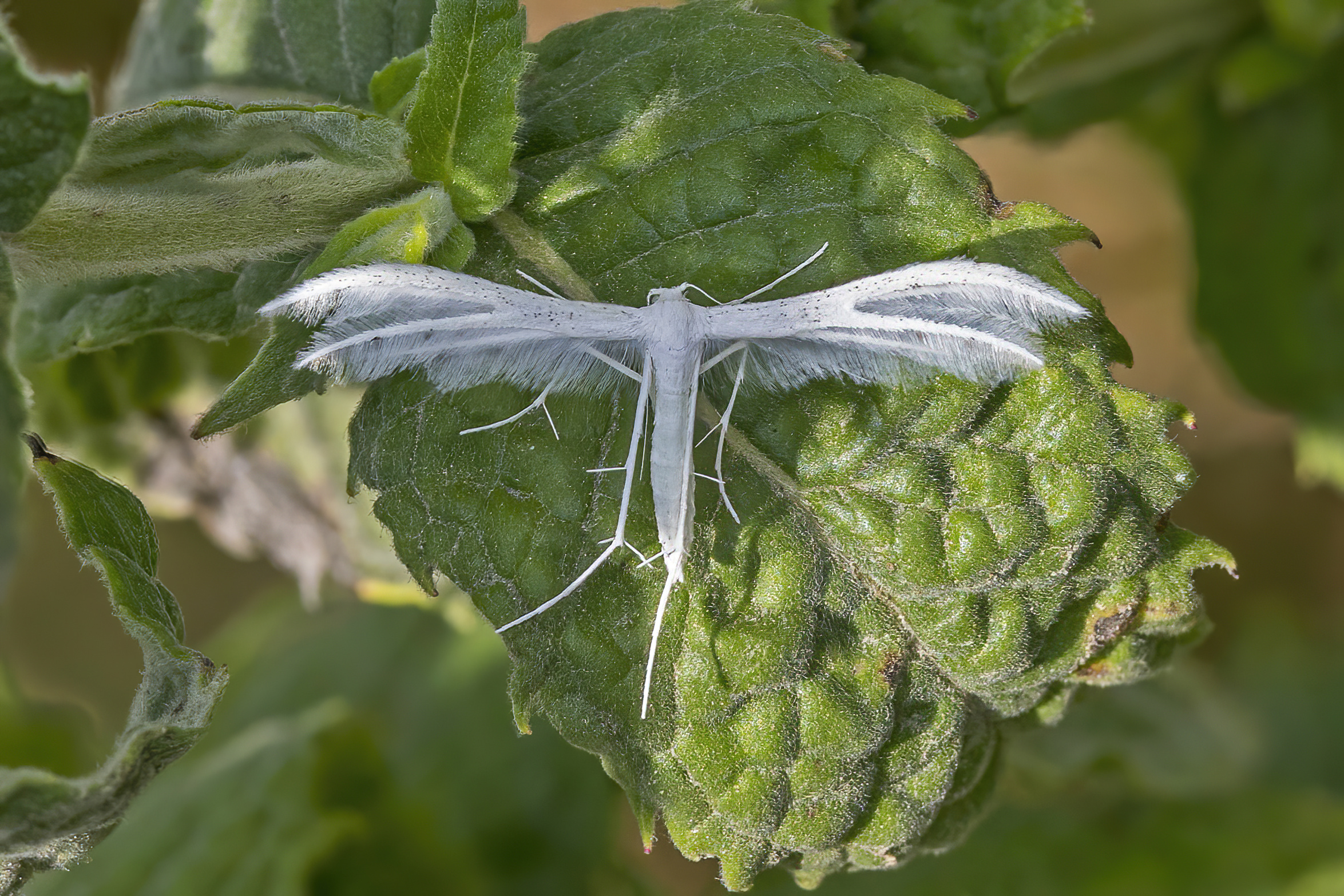
- Pterophorus pentadactyla

Scientific classification
- Kingdom: Animalia
- Phylum: Arthropoda
- Clade: Pancrustacea
- Class: Insecta
- Order: Lepidoptera
- Superfamily: Pterophoroidea
- Family: Pterophoridae; Zeller, 1841

Type species
- Pterophorus pentadactyla Linnaeus, 1758

Subfamilies
- Agdistinae; Deuterocopinae; Ochyroticinae; Pterophorinae

Diversity
- 95 genera >1,600 species

= Pterophoridae =

Pterophoridae Temporal range: Chattian–Present

Moth family containing the plume moths

The Pterophoridae or plume moths are a family of Lepidoptera with unusually modified wings, giving them the shape of a narrow winged airplane. Though they belong to the Apoditrysia like the larger moths and the butterflies, most plume moths are small and the group is often included in the assemblage called "microlepidoptera".

== Description and ecology ==
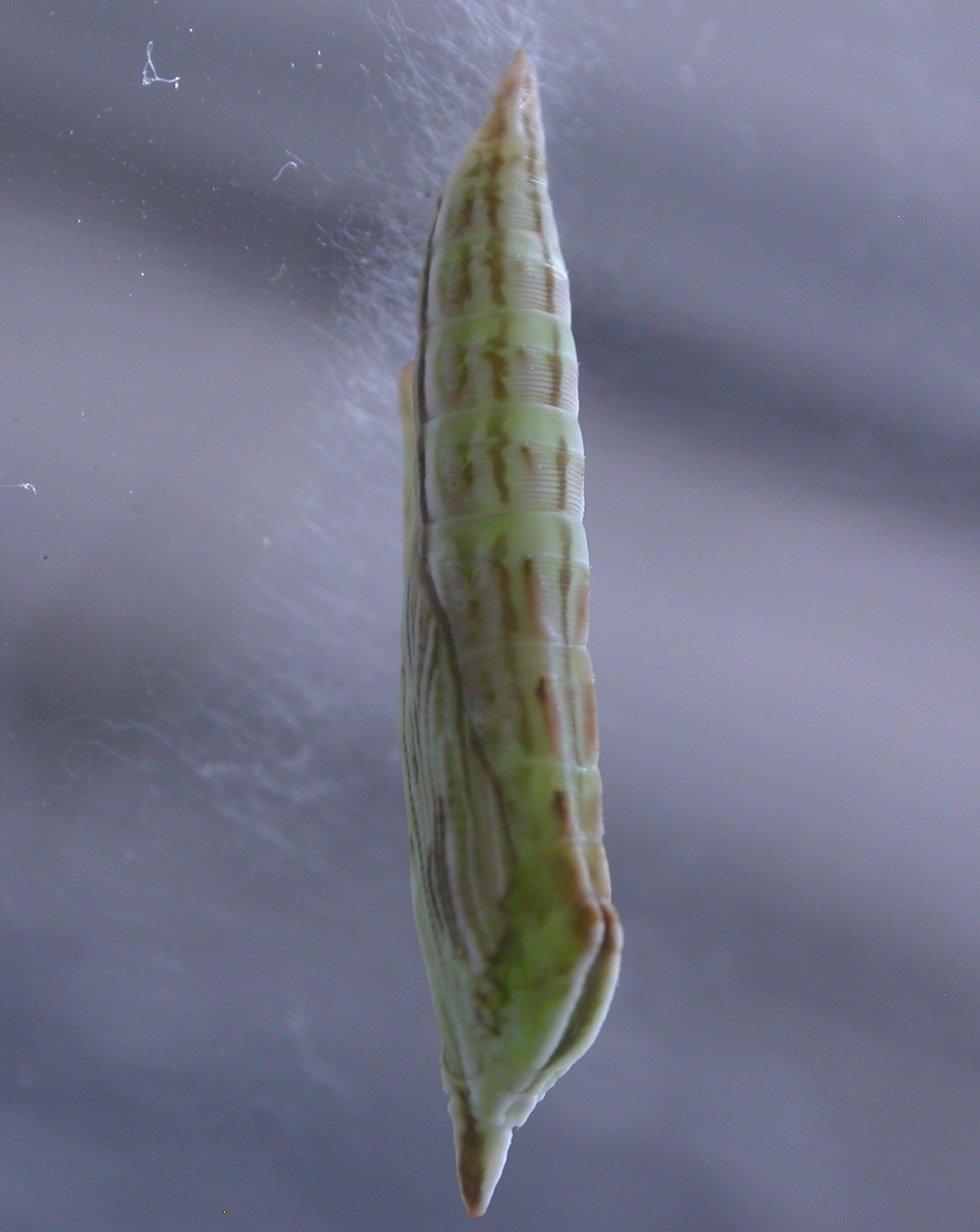
Pupa of Platyptilia tetradactyla (Pterophorinae: Platyptiliini)

The forewings of plume moths are usually divided for part of their length into two or three segments with variably feathered edges, particularly along the hind margin. Hindwings are generally divided into three segments. This unorthodox structure does not prevent flight. Genera in the subfamiles Agdistinae and Ochyroticinae have narrow but undivided wings like most Lepidoptera.

Moths in the family Alucitidae (many-plumed moths) have wings that are similarly divided, but most moths in this family have six segments in each wing. Moths in the genus Agdistopis superficially resemble the plume moth genus Agdistis and have previously been treated as part of the superfamily Pterophoroidea. However, recent work has demonstrated that these insects are more closely related to the Hybaleoidea or Copromorphoidea.

A synapomorphic character for all Pterophoridae is the presence of two rows of club-shaped scales on the undersides of the hindwings of both male and female insects (along veins m3 and cu1). The purpose of these scales is still unclear.

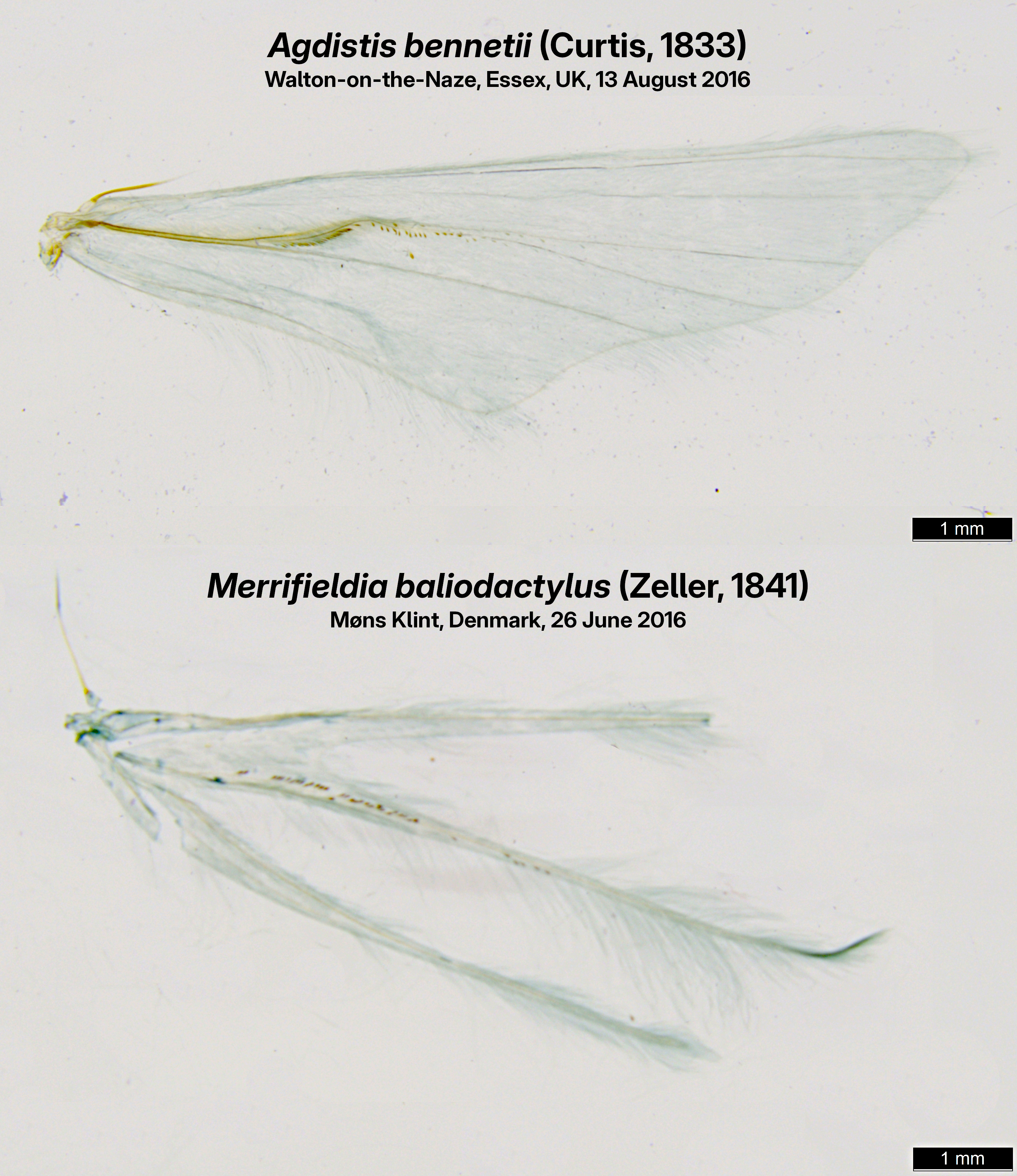
Plume moth venous scales

The usual resting posture is with the wings extended laterally and narrowly rolled up. Often they resemble a piece of dried grass, and may pass unnoticed by potential predators even when resting in exposed situations in daylight. Some species have larvae which are stem- or root-borers while others are leaf-browsers.

Bucks Plume avoids a crab spider

Economically important pterophorids include the artichoke plume moth (Platyptilia carduidactyla), an artichoke (Cynara cardunculus) pest in California, while the geranium plume moth (Platyptilia pica) and the snapdragon plume moth (Stenoptilodes antirrhina) can cause damage to the ornamental plants garden geranium (Pelargonium x hortorum) and common snapdragon (Antirrhinum majus), respectively. Other plume moths have been used as biological control agents against invasive plant species – Lantanophaga pusillidactyla against West Indian lantana (Lantana camara), Oidaematophorus beneficus against mistflower (Ageratina riparia), Hellinsia balanotes against groundsel bush (Baccharis halimifolia), and Wheeleria spilodactylus against horehound (Marrubium vulgare).

== Evolution ==
A fossil species from the extant genus Merrifieldia is known from the Oligocene of France.

== Taxonomy ==
The small group of moths in the genus Agdistopis has often been treated as a subfamily Macropiratinae within the Pterophoridae, but recent research indicates that this group should be considered a separate family. Around 1580 accepted species are currently accepted for the Pterophoridae.

The family is divided into the following subfamilies, tribes and genera, some species are also listed:
Subfamily Agdistinae

- Genus Agdistis Hübner, 1825
  - Agdistis bouyeri
  - Agdistis linnaei

Subfamily Ochyroticinae

- Genus Ochyrotica
  - Ochyrotica bjoernstadti

Subfamily Deuterocopinae Gielis, 1993

- Genus Deuterocopus
- Genus Heptaloba
- Genus Hexadactilia
- Genus Leptodeuterocopus

Subfamily Pterophorinae Zeller, 1841

- Tribe Tetraschalini
  - Genus Tetraschalis
  - Genus Titanoptilus
  - Genus Walsinghamiella
- Tribe Platyptiliini
  - Genus Amblyptilia Hübner, 1825
    - Amblyptilia acanthadactyla
  - Genus Anstenoptilia
  - Genus Asiaephorus
  - Genus Bigotilia
  - Genus Bipunctiphorus
  - Genus Buszkoiana
  - Genus Cnaemidophorus Wallengren, 1862
    - Cnaemidophorus rhododactyla
  - Genus Crocydoscelus
  - Genus Fletcherella
  - Genus Gillmeria Tutt, 1905
    - Gillmeria ochrodactyla
  - Genus Inferuncus
  - Genus Koremaguia
  - Genus Lantanophaga Zimmermann, 1958
    - Lantanophaga pusillidactyla
  - Genus Leesi
  - Genus Lioptilodes
  - Genus Melanoptilia
  - Genus Michaelophorus
  - Genus Nippoptilia
  - Genus Paraamblyptilia
  - Genus Paraplatyptilia
  - Genus Platyptilia Hübner, 1825
    - Platyptilia aarviki
    - Platyptilia calodactyla
    - Platyptilia carduidactyla – artichoke plume moth
    - Platyptilia celidotus
    - Platyptilia eberti
    - Platyptilia falcatalis
    - Platyptilia gonodactyla
    - Platyptilia nemoralis
    - Platyptilia nussi
  - Genus Platyptiliodes
  - Genus Postplatyptilia
  - Genus Quadriptilia
  - Genus Sinpunctiptilia
    - Sinpunctiptilia emissalis
  - Genus Sochchora
  - Genus Stenoptilia Hübner, 1825
    - Stenoptilia bipunctidactyla
    - Stenoptilia kiitulo
    - Stenoptilia pterodactyla
    - Stenoptilia zophodactylus
  - Genus Stenoptilodes Zimmermann, 1958
    - Stenoptilodes antirrhina – snapdragon plume moth
  - Genus Stockophorus
  - Genus Uroloba
  - Genus Vietteilus
  - Genus Xyroptila
- Tribe Marasmarchini
  - Genus Arcoptilia
  - Genus Exelastis
  - Genus Fuscoptilia
  - Genus Marasmarcha
  - Genus Parafuscoptilia
- Tribe Oxyptilini
  - Genus Antarches Gibeaux, 1994
  - Genus Apoxyptilus Alipanah et al., 2010
  - Genus Buckleria Tutt, 1905
    - Buckleria vanderwolfi
  - Genus Capperia
  - Genus Crombrugghia
  - Genus Dejongia
  - Genus Eucapperia
    - Eucapperia continentalis
  - Genus Geina
  - Genus Intercapperia
  - Genus Megalorhipida Amsel, 1935
    - Megalorrhipida leucodactyla
  - Genus Oxyptilus
  - Genus Paracapperia
  - Genus Prichotilus Rose and Pooni, 2003
  - Genus Procapperia
  - Genus Pseudoxyptilus Alipanah et al., 2010
  - Genus Sphenarches
  - Genus Stangeia Tutt, 1905
    - Stangeia xerodes
  - Genus Stenodacma
  - Genus Tomotilus
  - Genus Trichoptilus
- Tribe Oidaematophorini
  - Genus Adaina
  - Genus Crassuncus
  - Genus Emmelina Tutt, 1905
    - Emmelina monodactyla
  - Genus Gypsochares
  - Genus Hellinsia Tutt, 1905
    - Hellinsia balanotes
    - Hellinsia emmelinoida
  - Genus Helpaphorus
  - Genus Oidaematophorus Wallengren, 1862
    - Oidaematophorus beneficus
  - Genus Picardia
  - Genus Pselnophorus Wallengren, 1881
    - Pselnophorus meruensis
  - Genus Puerphorus
  - Genus Setosipennula
- Tribe Pterophorini
  - Genus Calyciphora
  - Genus Cosmoclostis
    - Cosmoclostis aglaodesma
    - Cosmoclostis hemiadelpha
    - Cosmoclostis pesseuta
  - Genus Diacrotricha
  - Genus Imbophorus
    - Imbophorus aptalis
    - Imbophorus leucophasmus
    - Imbophorus pallidus
  - Genus Merrifieldia
  - Genus Oirata
  - Genus Patagonophorus
  - Genus Porrittia
  - Genus Pterophorus
    - Pterophorus pentadactyla – white plume moth
  - Genus Septuaginta
  - Genus Singularia
  - Genus Tabulaephorus
  - Genus Wheeleria Tutt, 1905
    - Wheeleria spilodactylus
