= List of moths of India (Pterophoridae) =

This is a list of moths of the family Pterophoridae that are found in India. It also acts as an index to the species articles and forms part of the full List of moths of India.

== Subfamily Pterophorinae ==
- Amblyptilia forcipata (Zeller, 1867)
- Buckleria paludum (Zeller, 1839)
- Calyciphora sesamitis (Meyrick, 1905)
- Cosmoclostis auxileuca (Meyrick, 1907)
- Cosmoclostis leucomecola T. B. Fletcher, 1947
- Cosmoclostis pesseuta Meyrick, 1906
- Cosmoclostis premnicola T. B. Fletcher, 1932
- Crombrugghia clarisignis (Meyrick, 1924)
- Crombrugghia distans ( Zeller, 1847)
- Diacrotricha fasciola (Zeller, 1851)
- Emmelina argoteles (Meyrick, 1922)
- Emmelina monodactyla (Linnaeus, 1758)
- Exelastis atomosa (Walsingham, 1885)
- Exelastis crepuscularis (Meyrick, 1910)
- Exelastis phlyctaenias (Meyrick, 1911)
- Exelastis pumilio (Zeller, 1873)
- Gypsochares catharotes (Meyrick, 1907)
- Gypsochares kukti Arenberger, 1989
- Hellinsia aruna Arenberger, 1991
- Hellinsia distinctus (Herrich-Schäffer, 1855)
- Hellinsia fletcheri Arenberger, 1992
- Hellinsia fuscomarginata Arenberger, 1991
- Hellinsia lienigianus (Zeller, 1852)
- Hellinsia pectodactyla (Staudinger, 1859)
- Hellinsia shillongi Kovtunovich, 2003
- Hellinsia siniaevi Kovtunovich, 2003
- Hellinsia triadias (Meyrick, 1907)
- Hellinsia umrani Kovtunovich, 2003
- Intercapperia scindia Arenberger, 1988
- Koremaguia alticola (C. Felder, R. Felder & Rogenhofer, 1875)
- Koremaguia aurantidactyla Hampson, 1891
- Lantanophaga anellatus Rose & Pooni, 2003
- Lantanophaga pusillidactyla (Walker, 1864)
- Megalorhipida congrualis (Walker, 1864)
- Megalorhipida defectalis (Walker, 1864)
- Megalorhipida gielisi Rose & Pooni, 2003
- Megalorhipida paradefectalis Rose & Pooni, 2003
- Merrifieldia caspia (Lederer, 1870)
- Merrifieldia flavus (Arenberger, 1991)
- Oidaematophorus harpactes (Meyrick, 1908)
- Oidaematophorus hirosakianus (Matsumura, 1931)
- Oidaematophorus parshuramus Rose & Pooni, 2003
- Oidaematophorus procontias (Meyrick, 1908)
- Oidaematophorus sematias (Meyrick, 1908)
- Oidaematophorus triadias (Meyrick, 1908)
- Oxyptilus causodes Meyrick, 1905
- Oxyptilus chordites Meyrick, 1913
- Oxyptilus epidectis Meyrick, 1907
- Oxyptilus lactucae T. B. Fletcher, 1920
- Oxyptilus regalis T. B. Fletcher, 1909
- Oxyptilus regulus Meyrick, 1906
- Platyptilia cacaliae T. B. Fletcher, 1920
- Platyptilia citropleura Meyrick, 1907
- Platyptilia dejecta Meyrick, 1932
- Platyptilia direptalis (Walker, 1864)
- Platyptilia duneraensis Rose & Pooni, 2003
- Platyptilia euctimena Turner, 1913
- Platyptilia exaltatus (Zeller, 1867)
- Platyptilia gonodactylus (Denis & Schiffermüller, 1775)
- Platyptilia ignifera Meyrick, 1908
- Platyptilia isocrates Meyrick, 1924
- Platyptilia molopias Meyrick, 1906
- Platyptilia rhododactylus (Denis & Schiffermüller, 1775)
- Platyptilia sedata Meyrick, 1932
- Platyptilia superscandens T. B. Fletcher, 1940
- Platyptilia triphracta Meyrick, 1932
- Procapperia pelecyntes (Meyrick, 1907)
- Procapperia orientalis Arenberger, 1988
- Pselnophorus albitarsellus (Walsingham, 1900)
- Pterophorus elaeopus (Meyrick, 1908)
- Pterophorus lacteipennis (Walker, 1864)
- Pterophorus leucodactylus ( Walker, 1864)
- Pterophorus melanopodus (T. B. Fletcher, 1907)
- Pterophorus nigropunctatus Arenberger, 1989
- Pterophorus niveodactyla (Pagenstecher, 1900)
- Pterophorus tinsuki Kovtunovich, 2003
- Sphenarches anisodactylus (Walker, 1864)
- Sphenarches zanclistes (Meyrick, 1905)
- Stenodacma pyrrhodes (Meyrick, 1889)
- Stenodacma wahlbergi (Zeller, 1851)
- Stenoptilia caroli Arenberger, 1988
- Stenoptilia petraea Meyrick, 1907
- Stenoptilodes brachymorpha (Meyrick, 1888)
- Stenoptilodes taprobanes (C. Felder, R. Felder & Rogenhofer, 1875)
- Tetraschalis deltozela Meyrick, 1924
- Tetraschalis ischnites Meyrick, 1907
- Tetraschalis ochrias Meyrick, 1907
- Tomotilus saitoi Yano, 1961
- Trichoptilus archeodes Meyrick, 1913
- Trichoptilus bidens Meyrick, 1930
- Trichoptilus paludicola T. B. Fletcher, 1907
- Trichoptilus pelias Meyrick, 1907
- Trichoptilus xerodes Meyrick, 1886
- Xyroptila caminites Meyrick, 1908
- Xyroptila oenophanes Meyrick, 1908
- Xyroptila predator Meyrick, 1910
- Xyroptila soma Kovtunovich & Ustjuzhanin, 2006
- Xyroptila tectonica Meyrick, 1914
- Xyroptila vaughani T. B. Fletcher, 1909

== Subfamily Deuterocopinae ==
- Deuterocopus alopecodes Meyrick, 1911
- Deuterocopus atrapex T. B. Fletcher, 1909
- Deuterocopus dorites Meyrick, 1913
- Deuterocopus fervens Meyrick, 1913
- Deuterocopus planeta Meyrick, 1908
- Deuterocopus ritsemae Walsingham, 1884
- Deuterocopus socotranus Rebel, 1907

== Subfamily Ochyroticinae ==
- Ochyrotica connexiva (Walshingham, 1891)
- Ochyrotica concursa (Walshingham, 1891)
- Ochyrotica yanoi Arenberger, 1988

== Subfamily Agdistinae ==
- Agdistopis sinhala (T. B. Fletcher, 1909)
