= Gypsochares nielswolffi =

Scientific classification
- Kingdom: Animalia
- Phylum: Arthropoda
- Class: Insecta
- Order: Lepidoptera
- Family: Pterophoridae
- Genus: Gypsochares
- Species: G. nielswolffi

Binomial name
- Gypsochares nielswolffi Gielis & Arenberger, 1992

Species of plume moth

Gypsochares nielswolffi is a moth of the family Pterophoridae that is endemic to Madeira.
