= Ochyrotica kurandica =

Scientific classification
- Kingdom: Animalia
- Phylum: Arthropoda
- Class: Insecta
- Order: Lepidoptera
- Family: Pterophoridae
- Genus: Ochyrotica
- Species: O. kurandica

Binomial name
- Ochyrotica kurandica Arenberger, 1988

Species of plume moth

Ochyrotica kurandica is a moth of the family Pterophoridae. It is only known from localities near Kuranda in northern Queensland.

The wingspan is about 16 mm.

Adults are on wing in April, June and July.
