= Stangeia siceliota =

Scientific classification
- Kingdom: Animalia
- Phylum: Arthropoda
- Class: Insecta
- Order: Lepidoptera
- Family: Pterophoridae
- Genus: Stangeia
- Species: S. siceliota

Binomial name
- Stangeia siceliota (Zeller, 1847)

Synonyms
- Pterophorus siceliota Zeller, 1847

Species of plume moth

Stangeia siceliota is a moth of the family Pterophoridae that is known from Yemen, China and southern Europe. It is also known from Turkey and Armenia.
