= Cosmoclostis =

Scientific classification
- Kingdom: Animalia
- Phylum: Arthropoda
- Class: Insecta
- Order: Lepidoptera
- Family: Pterophoridae
- Subfamily: Pterophorinae
- Tribe: Pterophorini
- Genus: Cosmoclostis; Meyrick, 1886

Genus of moths

Cosmoclostis is a genus of moths in the family Pterophoridae. Species are known from Australia, China, South and South East Asia, the Arabic Peninsula and Africa.

== Species ==
As of version 1.1.23.125, the Catalogue of the Pterophoroidea of the World lists the following species for genus Cosmoclostis:

- Cosmoclostis aglaodesma Meyrick, 1886
- Cosmoclostis auxileuca (Meyrick, 1908)
- Cosmoclostis bivalva Gielis, 2011
- Cosmoclostis brachybela Fletcher, 1947
- Cosmoclostis chalconota Fletcher, 1947
- Cosmoclostis gmelina Hao, Li & Wu, 2004
- Cosmoclostis hemiadelpha Fletcher, 1947
- Cosmoclostis lamprosema Fletcher, 1947
- Cosmoclostis lanceatus (Arenberger, 1985)
- Cosmoclostis leucomochla Fletcher, 1947
- Cosmoclostis parauxileuca Hao, Li & Wu, 2004
- Cosmoclostis pesseuta Meyrick, 1906
- Cosmoclostis quadriquadra Walsingham, 1900
- Cosmoclostis schouteni Gielis, 1990
