= Ochyrotica africana =

Scientific classification
- Kingdom: Animalia
- Phylum: Arthropoda
- Clade: Pancrustacea
- Class: Insecta
- Order: Lepidoptera
- Family: Pterophoridae
- Genus: Ochyrotica
- Species: O. africana

Binomial name
- Ochyrotica africana (Bigot, 1969)

Synonyms
- Steganodactyla africana Bigot, 1969

Species of plume moth

Ochyrotica africana is a moth of the family Pterophoridae. It is known from the Democratic Republic of Congo.
