= Cosmoclostis hemiadelpha =

Scientific classification
- Kingdom: Animalia
- Phylum: Arthropoda
- Class: Insecta
- Order: Lepidoptera
- Family: Pterophoridae
- Genus: Cosmoclostis
- Species: C. hemiadelpha

Binomial name
- Cosmoclostis hemiadelpha T. B. Fletcher, 1947

Species of plume moth

Cosmoclostis hemiadelpha is a species of moth of the family Pterophoridae described by Thomas Bainbrigge Fletcher in 1947. It is found in Australia in Queensland and in New Guinea.
