= Ochyrotica javanica =

Scientific classification
- Kingdom: Animalia
- Phylum: Arthropoda
- Class: Insecta
- Order: Lepidoptera
- Family: Pterophoridae
- Genus: Ochyrotica
- Species: O. javanica

Binomial name
- Ochyrotica javanica Gielis, 1988

Species of plume moth

Ochyrotica javanica is a moth of the family Pterophoridae. It is found on Java.

The wingspan is about 18 mm. The forewings are dirty white.
