= Gypsochares aulotes =

Scientific classification
- Kingdom: Animalia
- Phylum: Arthropoda
- Class: Insecta
- Order: Lepidoptera
- Family: Pterophoridae
- Genus: Gypsochares
- Species: G. aulotes

Binomial name
- Gypsochares aulotes (Meyrick, 1911)

Synonyms
- Pselnophorus aulotes Meyrick, 1911

Species of plume moth

Gypsochares aulotes is a moth of the family Pterophoridae that is known from South Africa.
