= Gypsochares baptodactylus =

Scientific classification
- Domain: Eukaryota
- Kingdom: Animalia
- Phylum: Arthropoda
- Class: Insecta
- Order: Lepidoptera
- Family: Pterophoridae
- Genus: Gypsochares
- Species: G. baptodactylus

Binomial name
- Gypsochares baptodactylus (Zeller, 1850)

Synonyms
- Pterophorus baptodactylus Zeller, 1850; Gypsochares dactilographa Turati, 1927

Species of plume moth

Gypsochares baptodactylus is a moth of the family Pterophoridae that can be found in Italy, Sardinia, Corsica, Slovenia and Croatia.

The larvae possibly feed on Helichrysum italicum.
