= Trichoptilus viduus =

Scientific classification
- Kingdom: Animalia
- Phylum: Arthropoda
- Class: Insecta
- Order: Lepidoptera
- Family: Pterophoridae
- Genus: Trichoptilus
- Species: T. viduus

Binomial name
- Trichoptilus viduus Meyrick, 1917

Species of plume moth

Trichoptilus viduus is a moth of the family Pterophoridae that is known from South Africa.

== Description ==
The wingspan is 14–15 millimetres (0.55–0.59 in). The head and thorax are fuscous with some whitish scales. The palpi are fuscous and the apex of the joints white. The abdomen is ochreous-grey, with a lateral row of white spots. The forewings are fuscous irrorated with darker, there is a blackish dot in a disc and two dots transversely placed at the base of the cleft. There are narrow irregular white transverse bars on both segments. The cilia are grey mixed with blackish towards the base and with white spots on the margins of the markings and above and below the apex of each segment, on the dorsum with blackish scale-projections between these. The tornal white patch is the largest. The hindwings are dark fuscous, the third segment grey irrorated with dark fuscous. The cilia are fuscous, on dorsum with a rather small blackish scale-projection and a few white scales before this.
