= Ochyrotica cretosa =

Scientific classification
- Domain: Eukaryota
- Kingdom: Animalia
- Phylum: Arthropoda
- Class: Insecta
- Order: Lepidoptera
- Family: Pterophoridae
- Genus: Ochyrotica
- Species: O. cretosa

Binomial name
- Ochyrotica cretosa (Durrant, 1915)

Synonyms
- Steganodactyla cretosa Durrant, 1915

Species of plume moth

Ochyrotica cretosa is a moth of the family Pterophoridae. It is known from New Guinea, the Moluccas and the Solomon Islands.
