= Deuterocopus famulus =

Scientific classification
- Kingdom: Animalia
- Phylum: Arthropoda
- Class: Insecta
- Order: Lepidoptera
- Family: Pterophoridae
- Genus: Deuterocopus
- Species: D. famulus

Binomial name
- Deuterocopus famulus Meyrick, 1908

Species of plume moth

Deuterocopus famulus is a moth of the family Pterophoridae. It is found on the Moluccas.
