= Ochyrotica buergersi =

Scientific classification
- Kingdom: Animalia
- Phylum: Arthropoda
- Class: Insecta
- Order: Lepidoptera
- Family: Pterophoridae
- Genus: Ochyrotica
- Species: O. buergersi

Binomial name
- Ochyrotica buergersi Gaede, 1916

Species of plume moth

Ochyrotica buergersi is a moth of the family Pterophoridae. It is known from New Guinea, New Britain and Santa Isabel.
