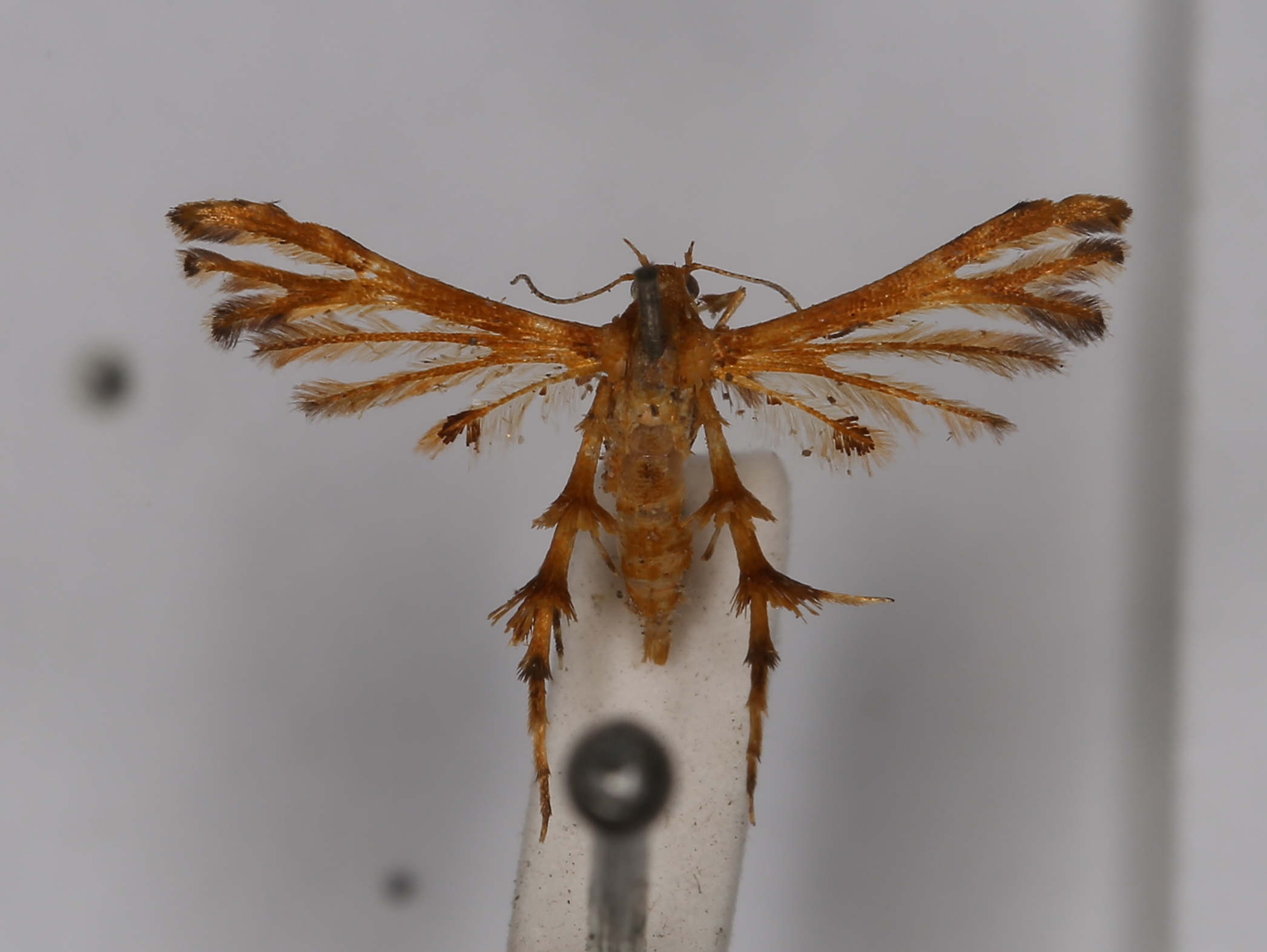
- Deuterocopus tengstroemi Zeller, 1852, Natural History Museum specimen NHMUK 010919173
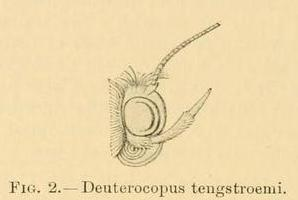

Scientific classification
- Kingdom: Animalia
- Phylum: Arthropoda
- Clade: Pancrustacea
- Class: Insecta
- Order: Lepidoptera
- Family: Pterophoridae
- Genus: Deuterocopus
- Species: D. tengstroemi

Binomial name
- Deuterocopus tengstroemi Zeller, 1852

= Deuterocopus tengstroemi =

Species of plume moth

Deuterocopus tengstroemi is a moth of the family Pterophoridae. It is known from Java and Queensland, Australia.

Larvae have been recorded feeding on Vitis quadrangularis.

== Original description ==
(wingspan female 12 mm) Palpi long, slender, semi-erect, pale-ferruginous; second joint very slightly dilated at apex, where it is banded with dark-ferruginous; third joint slightly over half length of second, acuminate, broadly banded with dark-ferruginous at base and apex. Antennae dark-ferruginous, dotted with whitish above. Head light-ferruginous, top of crown with long anteriorly-erected scales. Thorax light-ferruginous; pectus marked with whitish. Abdomen stout, light-ferruginous with traces of whitish submedian spots on second segment, and of a narrow transverse white band along posterior edge of third segment; ventral surface white, mottled on sides with ferruginous-golden, fourth segment margined posteriorly with ferruginous-golden. Foreleg whitish-ferruginous, tibia with apical scale-tuft of darker ferruginous scales (but no "white spines"). Midleg whitish-ferruginous, tibia with apical scale-tuft of darker-ferruginous scales (spurs broken). [Hindlegs missing.] Forewing cleft from rather within 3/5, first segment moderately broad with slight hinder-angle, second segment expanded posteriorly and again cleft to one-half of its own length, subsegments linear, first parallel to first segment, divergent from second: bright ferruginous-golden slightly suffused with light ferruginous: first segment lightly suffused with ferruginous except on costa at 1/4 length of segment, cut at about 2/3 by a nearly obsolete inwardly-oblique whitish line; second segment lightly suffused with ferruginous, first subsegment with a minute whitish dot near base. Cilia on costa light-ferruginous, slightly darker on base of first segment, on first segment black at 2/5 as a slight bar, with slight blackish admixture at 3/5 and 4/5; at apex black; on hinder-margin of first segment whitish-ochreous from 2/3 to immediately before hinder-angle blackish-ferruginous, a hinder-angle a small blackish wisp preceded by a very narrow ferruginous wisp, on termen pale-ferruginous with a blackish basal line; on fore-margin of second segment whitish-ochreous, beyond 3/4 blackish-ferruginous, at apex of first subsegment wliitish-ocbreous with a broad blackish basal line surrounding apex of subsegment and forming a very small posteriorly-directed scale-tooth; on hinder-margin of first subsegment dark-ferruginous to 1/2, beyond 1/2 whitish-ochreous; on fore-margin of second subsegment dark-ferruginous to 1/2, beyond 1/2 blackish; at apex of second subsegment whitish-ochreous with a black basal line produced into a small posteriorly-directed tornal scale-tooth; on dorsum whitish-ochreous, a small blackish wisp beneath base of second cleft, cilia beyond this darker. Hindwing cleft from about 3/5 and from near base, segments linear; bright ferruginous-golden slightly suffused with light-ferruginous. Cilia whitish-ochreous; third segment with a large apical blackish-ferruginous scale-tooth on both margins, a few small scattered black scales on fore-margin, and a small blackish tooth on dorsum slightly before 1/2. Habitat. Zeller's original specimens, one of which I have examined, were from Java. The only other examples which I have seen are two from Queensland in Lord Walsingham's collection, one from Cedar Bay (Meek, 1894), the other - very worn and possibly not really tengstroemi, its condition making its identification doubtful - from Geraldton, near Cairns (Meek, 1894).

— Original re-description by T.B. Fletcher
