= Stangeia rapae =

Scientific classification
- Kingdom: Animalia
- Phylum: Arthropoda
- Class: Insecta
- Order: Lepidoptera
- Family: Pterophoridae
- Genus: Stangeia
- Species: S. rapae

Binomial name
- Stangeia rapae Clarke, 1971

Species of plume moth

Stangeia rapae is a moth of the family Pterophoridae that is found in French Polynesia (Rapa Island).

The wingspan is 13–16 millimetres (0.51–0.63 in). The head is grey with scattered white scales. The thorax is grey, but posteriorly creamy white with three longitudinal pale, clay-coloured lines. The forewing ground colour is grey, dorsally suffused pale brownish. The hindwings are greyish fuscous.

The larvae feed on Sigesbeckia orientalis. They feed in the inflorescence of their host plant. Pupation takes place on the flower stalks or very small leaves.
