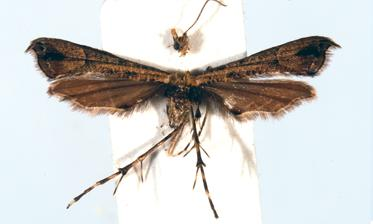

Scientific classification
- Kingdom: Animalia
- Phylum: Arthropoda
- Class: Insecta
- Order: Lepidoptera
- Family: Pterophoridae
- Genus: Ochyrotica
- Species: O. bjoernstadti

Binomial name
- Ochyrotica bjoernstadti Gielis, 2008

= Ochyrotica bjoernstadti =

Species of plume moth

Ochyrotica bjoernstadti is a moth of the family Pterophoroidea. It is found in Tanzania.

The wingspan is about 16 mm. The moth flies in May.
