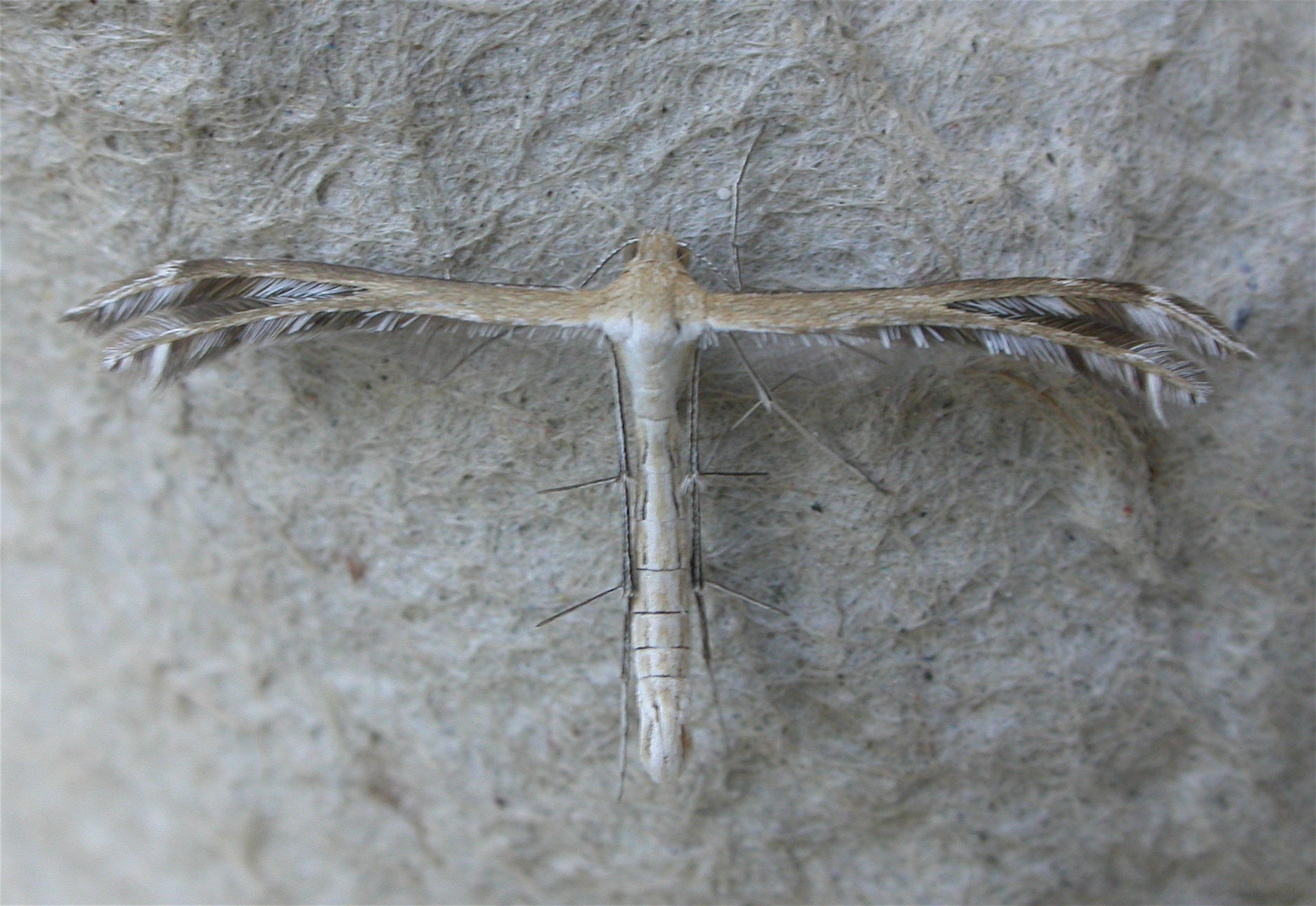

Scientific classification
- Kingdom: Animalia
- Phylum: Arthropoda
- Class: Insecta
- Order: Lepidoptera
- Family: Pterophoridae
- Tribe: Oxyptilini
- Genus: Stangeia; Tutt, 1905

= Stangeia =

Plume moth genus

Stangeia is a genus of moths in the family Pterophoridae.

== Species ==
- Stangeia distantia Clarke, 1986
- Stangeia rapae Clarke, 1971
- Stangeia siceliota (Zeller, 1847)
- Stangeia xerodes (Meyrick, 1886)
