= Ochyrotica breviapex =

Scientific classification
- Kingdom: Animalia
- Phylum: Arthropoda
- Class: Insecta
- Order: Lepidoptera
- Family: Pterophoridae
- Genus: Ochyrotica
- Species: O. breviapex

Binomial name
- Ochyrotica breviapex Gielis, 1990

Species of plume moth

Ochyrotica breviapex is a moth of the family Pterophoridae. It is known from Indonesia, Papua New Guinea, Guadalcanal, Misamis and Mindanao.
