= Deuterocopus issikii =

Scientific classification
- Domain: Eukaryota
- Kingdom: Animalia
- Phylum: Arthropoda
- Class: Insecta
- Order: Lepidoptera
- Family: Pterophoridae
- Genus: Deuterocopus
- Species: D. issikii

Binomial name
- Deuterocopus issikii Yano, 1963

Species of plume moth

Deuterocopus issikii is a moth of the family Pterophoridae. It is known from New Guinea.

The length of the forewings is about 5.5 mm.
