= Ochyrotica pseudocretosa =

Scientific classification
- Kingdom: Animalia
- Phylum: Arthropoda
- Class: Insecta
- Order: Lepidoptera
- Family: Pterophoridae
- Genus: Ochyrotica
- Species: O. pseudocretosa

Binomial name
- Ochyrotica pseudocretosa Gielis, 1990

Species of plume moth

Ochyrotica pseudocretosa is a moth of the family Pterophoridae. It is known from New Guinea and the Moluccas.
