= Ochyrotica placozona =

Scientific classification
- Domain: Eukaryota
- Kingdom: Animalia
- Phylum: Arthropoda
- Class: Insecta
- Order: Lepidoptera
- Family: Pterophoridae
- Genus: Ochyrotica
- Species: O. placozona

Binomial name
- Ochyrotica placozona Meyrick, 1921

Species of plume moth

Ochyrotica placozona is a moth of the family Pterophoridae. It is known from Panama, Peru and Venezuela.

The wingspan is 16–19 mm. Adults are on wing in March.
