= Cosmoclostis aglaodesma =

Scientific classification
- Kingdom: Animalia
- Phylum: Arthropoda
- Class: Insecta
- Order: Lepidoptera
- Family: Pterophoridae
- Genus: Cosmoclostis
- Species: C. aglaodesma

Binomial name
- Cosmoclostis aglaodesma Meyrick, 1886

Species of plume moth

Cosmoclostis aglaodesma is a species of moth of the family Pterophoridae. It is found in Australia from the Atherton Tableland in Queensland, south to near Taree in New South Wales.

The larvae feed on the flowers of Gmelina arborea and Tectona species.
