= Ochyrotica koteka =

Scientific classification
- Kingdom: Animalia
- Phylum: Arthropoda
- Class: Insecta
- Order: Lepidoptera
- Family: Pterophoridae
- Genus: Ochyrotica
- Species: O. koteka

Binomial name
- Ochyrotica koteka Arenberger, 1992

Species of plume moth

Ochyrotica koteka is a moth of the family Pterophoridae. It is found in Papua New Guinea.

The wingspan is about 14 mm. Adults have been recorded in March and April.
