= Ochyrotica misoolica =

Scientific classification
- Kingdom: Animalia
- Phylum: Arthropoda
- Class: Insecta
- Order: Lepidoptera
- Family: Pterophoridae
- Genus: Ochyrotica
- Species: O. misoolica

Binomial name
- Ochyrotica misoolica Gielis, 1988

Species of plume moth

Ochyrotica misoolica is a moth of the family Pterophoridae. It is known from New Guinea and the Moluccas.

The wingspan is 14–16 mm. Adults have been recorded from June to July and from September to October on the Moluccas.
