= Deuterocopus deltoptilus =

Scientific classification
- Kingdom: Animalia
- Phylum: Arthropoda
- Class: Insecta
- Order: Lepidoptera
- Family: Pterophoridae
- Genus: Deuterocopus
- Species: D. deltoptilus

Binomial name
- Deuterocopus deltoptilus Meyrick, 1930

Species of plume moth

Deuterocopus deltoptilus is a moth of the family Pterophoridae. It is known from Uganda.
