= Ochyrotica toxopeusi =

Scientific classification
- Kingdom: Animalia
- Phylum: Arthropoda
- Class: Insecta
- Order: Lepidoptera
- Family: Pterophoridae
- Genus: Ochyrotica
- Species: O. toxopeusi

Binomial name
- Ochyrotica toxopeusi Gielis, 1988

Species of plume moth

Ochyrotica toxopeusi is a moth of the family Pterophoridae. It is known from New Guinea, Sulawesi and Irian Jaya.
