= Trichoptilus festus =

Scientific classification
- Kingdom: Animalia
- Phylum: Arthropoda
- Class: Insecta
- Order: Lepidoptera
- Family: Pterophoridae
- Genus: Trichoptilus
- Species: T. festus

Binomial name
- Trichoptilus festus Meyrick, 1920

Synonyms
- Trichoptilus animosus Meyrick, 1921

Species of plume moth

Trichoptilus festus is a moth of the family Pterophoridae that is known from South Africa.
