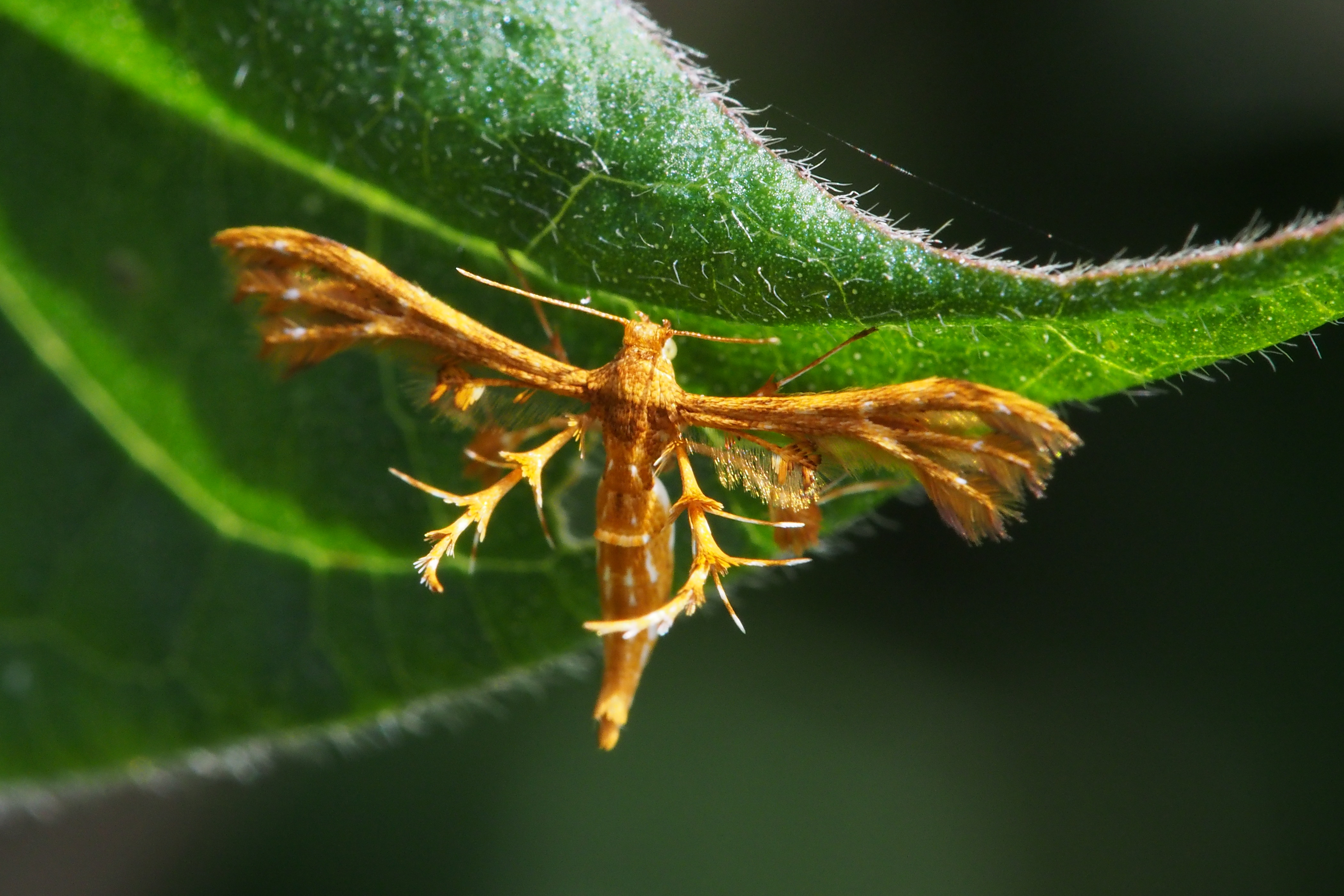

Scientific classification
- Domain: Eukaryota
- Kingdom: Animalia
- Phylum: Arthropoda
- Class: Insecta
- Order: Lepidoptera
- Family: Pterophoridae
- Genus: Deuterocopus
- Species: D. albipunctatus

Binomial name
- Deuterocopus albipunctatus T. B. Fletcher, 1910

= Deuterocopus albipunctatus =

Species of plume moth

Deuterocopus albipunctatus is a moth of the family Pterophoridae. The species was described by Thomas Bainbrigge Fletcher in 1910. It is known from Japan (Honshu, Shikoku, Kyushu, Tsushima, Yaku-shima), Korea and China.

The length of the forewings is about 7 mm.

The larvae feed on Ampelopsis glandulosa, Vitis thunbergii and Vitis vinifera. The pupal period is 8–10 days in September and October. This species spends the winter in the adult stage.
