= Ochyrotica zolotuhini =

Scientific classification
- Kingdom: Animalia
- Phylum: Arthropoda
- Clade: Pancrustacea
- Class: Insecta
- Order: Lepidoptera
- Family: Pterophoridae
- Genus: Ochyrotica
- Species: O. zolotuhini

Binomial name
- Ochyrotica zolotuhini Ustjuzhanin & Kovtunovich, 2010

Species of plume moth

Ochyrotica zolotuhini is a moth of the family Pterophoridae. It is found in Vietnam.

The wingspan is 16–18 mm.
