= Ochyrotica mexicana =

Scientific classification
- Kingdom: Animalia
- Phylum: Arthropoda
- Class: Insecta
- Order: Lepidoptera
- Family: Pterophoridae
- Genus: Ochyrotica
- Species: O. mexicana

Binomial name
- Ochyrotica mexicana Arenberger, 1990

Species of plume moth

Ochyrotica mexicana is a moth of the family Pterophoridae. It is known from Guatemala, Mexico and Venezuela.

The wingspan is 15–16 mm. Adults are on wing in July, August and November.
