= Ochyrotica rufa =

Scientific classification
- Kingdom: Animalia
- Phylum: Arthropoda
- Class: Insecta
- Order: Lepidoptera
- Family: Pterophoridae
- Genus: Ochyrotica
- Species: O. rufa

Binomial name
- Ochyrotica rufa Arenberger, 1987

Species of plume moth

Ochyrotica rufa is a moth of the family Pterophoridae.

== Distribution ==
It is known from Comoros, La Réunion, Madagascar and Mauritius.

== Biology ==
A known host-plant of this species is Ipomoea batatas (Convolvulaceae).
