= Gypsochares astragalotes =

Scientific classification
- Kingdom: Animalia
- Phylum: Arthropoda
- Class: Insecta
- Order: Lepidoptera
- Family: Pterophoridae
- Genus: Gypsochares
- Species: G. astragalotes

Binomial name
- Gypsochares astragalotes (Meyrick, 1909)

Synonyms
- Pselnophorus astragalotes Meyrick 1909

Species of plume moth

Gypsochares astragalotes is a moth of the family Pterophoridae that is known from South Africa.
