= Ochyrotica fasciata =

Scientific classification
- Domain: Eukaryota
- Kingdom: Animalia
- Phylum: Arthropoda
- Class: Insecta
- Order: Lepidoptera
- Family: Pterophoridae
- Genus: Ochyrotica
- Species: O. fasciata

Binomial name
- Ochyrotica fasciata Walsingham, 1891

Species of plume moth

Ochyrotica fasciata is a moth of the family Pterophoridae. It is widely distributed in the tropical zone of the Neotropical Region, including Brazil, Costa Rica, Cuba, Dominica, Ecuador, Grenada, Guatemala, Jamaica, Peru and Puerto Rico.

The wingspan is 12–16 mm. Adults are on wing year round.

The larvae feed on Ipomaea batatas.
