= Ochyrotica borneoica =

Scientific classification
- Kingdom: Animalia
- Phylum: Arthropoda
- Class: Insecta
- Order: Lepidoptera
- Family: Pterophoridae
- Genus: Ochyrotica
- Species: O. borneoica

Binomial name
- Ochyrotica borneoica Gielis, 1988

Species of plume moth

Ochyrotica borneoica is a moth of the family Pterophoridae. It is known from Borneo and the Sulu Archipelago.

The wingspan is 14–15 mm. Adults have been recorded in September, October and December on Borneo.
