= Cosmoclostis lamprosema =

Scientific classification
- Kingdom: Animalia
- Phylum: Arthropoda
- Class: Insecta
- Order: Lepidoptera
- Family: Pterophoridae
- Genus: Cosmoclostis
- Species: C. lamprosema

Binomial name
- Cosmoclostis lamprosema T. B. Fletcher, 1947

Species of plume moth

Cosmoclostis lamprosema is a moth of the family Pterophoridae. It was described by Thomas Bainbrigge Fletcher in 1947 and is known from New Guinea, the Moluccas, the Louisiade Archipelago, the Bismarck Archipelago and the Solomon Islands.
