= Trichoptilus varius =

Scientific classification
- Kingdom: Animalia
- Phylum: Arthropoda
- Class: Insecta
- Order: Lepidoptera
- Family: Pterophoridae
- Genus: Trichoptilus
- Species: T. varius

Binomial name
- Trichoptilus varius Meyrick, 1909

Synonyms
- Megalorhipida varius (Meyrick, 1909)

Species of plume moth

Trichoptilus varius is a moth of the family Pterophoridae that is known from South Africa.
