= Gypsochares londti =

Scientific classification
- Domain: Eukaryota
- Kingdom: Animalia
- Phylum: Arthropoda
- Class: Insecta
- Order: Lepidoptera
- Family: Pterophoridae
- Genus: Gypsochares
- Species: G. londti

Binomial name
- Gypsochares londti Ustjuzhanin et Kovtunovich, 2010

Species of plume moth

Gypsochares londti is a moth of the family Pterophoridae that is known from South Africa.
