= Trichoptilus cryphias =

Scientific classification
- Kingdom: Animalia
- Phylum: Arthropoda
- Class: Insecta
- Order: Lepidoptera
- Family: Pterophoridae
- Genus: Trichoptilus
- Species: T. cryphias

Binomial name
- Trichoptilus cryphias Meyrick, 1912

Species of plume moth

Trichoptilus cryphias is a moth of the family Pterophoridae that is known from South Africa.
