= Deuterocopus melanota =

Scientific classification
- Domain: Eukaryota
- Kingdom: Animalia
- Phylum: Arthropoda
- Class: Insecta
- Order: Lepidoptera
- Family: Pterophoridae
- Genus: Deuterocopus
- Species: D. melanota

Binomial name
- Deuterocopus melanota T. B. Fletcher, 1910

Synonyms
- Deuterocopus lophopteryx T. B. Fletcher, 1910

Species of plume moth

Deuterocopus melanota is a moth of the family Pterophoridae. It was described by Thomas Bainbrigge Fletcher in 1910 and it is found in Malaysia and Sri Lanka.
