= Trichoptilus =

Scientific classification
- Kingdom: Animalia
- Phylum: Arthropoda
- Class: Insecta
- Order: Lepidoptera
- Family: Pterophoridae
- Tribe: Oxyptilini
- Genus: Trichoptilus; Walsingham, 1880

Plume moth genus

Trichoptilus is a genus of moths in the family Pterophoridae.

== Species ==
- Trichoptilus animosus
- Trichoptilus archeaodes
- Trichoptilus ceramodes
- Trichoptilus cryphias
- Trichoptilus festus
- Trichoptilus inclitus
- Trichoptilus negotiosus
- Trichoptilus pelias
- Trichoptilus potentellus
- Trichoptilus pygmaeus
- Trichoptilus regalis
- Trichoptilus scythrodes
- Trichoptilus subtilis (=Trichoptilus maceratus)
- Trichoptilus varius
- Trichoptilus viduus
- Trichoptilus vivax

== Former species ==
- Trichoptilus bidens is now Prichotilus bidens
