= Gypsochares kyraensis =

Scientific classification
- Domain: Eukaryota
- Kingdom: Animalia
- Phylum: Arthropoda
- Class: Insecta
- Order: Lepidoptera
- Family: Pterophoridae
- Genus: Gypsochares
- Species: G. kyraensis

Binomial name
- Gypsochares kyraensis (Ustjuzhanin, 1996)

Synonyms
- Sibirretta kyraensis Ustjuzhanin, 1996

Species of plume moth

Gypsochares kyraensis is a moth of the family Pterophoridae that is found in Russia (the South Siberian Mountains).
