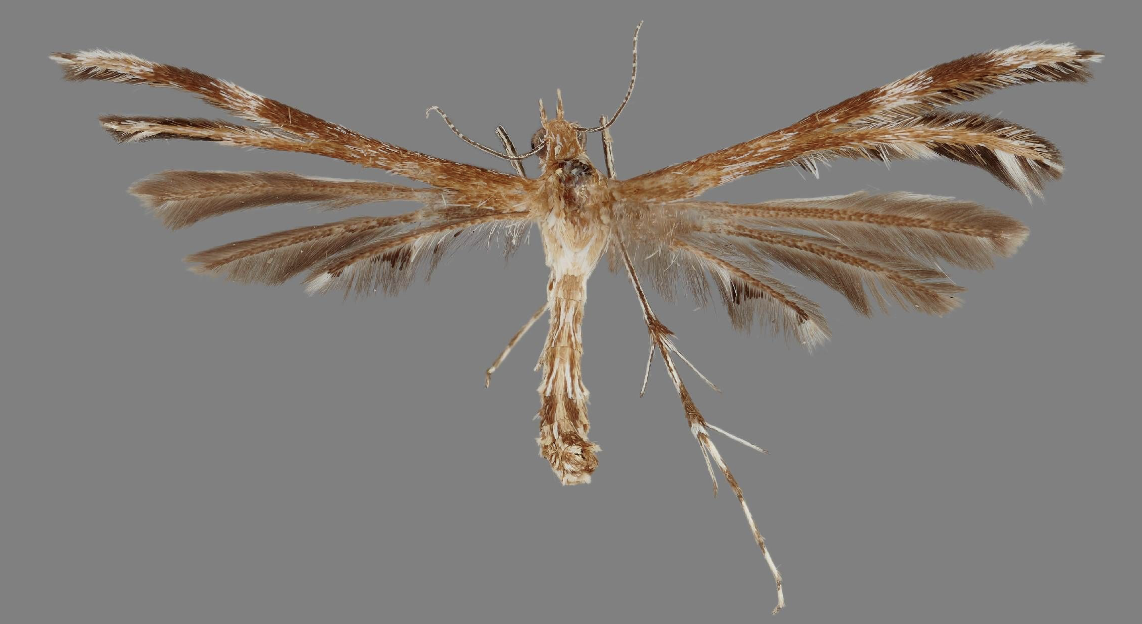

Scientific classification
- Kingdom: Animalia
- Phylum: Arthropoda
- Class: Insecta
- Order: Lepidoptera
- Family: Pterophoridae
- Genus: Trichoptilus
- Species: T. potentellus

Binomial name
- Trichoptilus potentellus Lange, 1940

= Trichoptilus potentellus =

Species of plume moth

Trichoptilus potentellus is a moth of the family Pterophoridae. It is found in North America, including California.

== Taxonomy ==
Trichoptilus potentellus is sometimes listed as a synonym of Trichoptilus pygmaeus.
