= Gypsochares bigoti =

Scientific classification
- Domain: Eukaryota
- Kingdom: Animalia
- Phylum: Arthropoda
- Class: Insecta
- Order: Lepidoptera
- Family: Pterophoridae
- Genus: Gypsochares
- Species: G. bigoti

Binomial name
- Gypsochares bigoti Gibeaux & Nel, 1989

Species of plume moth

Gypsochares bigoti is a moth of the family Pterophoridae that can be found in France, Portugal and Spain.

The larvae feed on Helichrysum stoechas.
