= Deuterocopus devosi =

Scientific classification
- Kingdom: Animalia
- Phylum: Arthropoda
- Clade: Pancrustacea
- Class: Insecta
- Order: Lepidoptera
- Family: Pterophoridae
- Genus: Deuterocopus
- Species: D. devosi

Binomial name
- Deuterocopus devosi Gielis, 2003

Species of plume moth

Deuterocopus devosi is a moth of the family Pterophoridae. It is known from New Guinea.

The wingspan is about 10 mm. Adults are on wing in March and November.
