= Tetraschalis mikado =

Scientific classification
- Kingdom: Animalia
- Phylum: Arthropoda
- Class: Insecta
- Order: Lepidoptera
- Family: Pterophoridae
- Genus: Tetraschalis
- Species: T. mikado

Binomial name
- Tetraschalis mikado (Hori, 1933)

Synonyms
- Xenopterophora mikado Hori, 1933

Species of plume moth

Tetraschalis mikado is a moth of the family Pterophoridae. It is known from the islands of Honshu and Kyushu in Japan.

The length of the forewings is 11–13 mm.
