= Tetraschalis lemurodes =

Scientific classification
- Kingdom: Animalia
- Phylum: Arthropoda
- Clade: Pancrustacea
- Class: Insecta
- Order: Lepidoptera
- Family: Pterophoridae
- Genus: Tetraschalis
- Species: T. lemurodes

Binomial name
- Tetraschalis lemurodes Meyrick, 1908

Species of plume moth

Tetraschalis lemurodes is a moth of the family Pterophoridae. It is known from New Guinea.
