= Ochyrotica moheliensis =

Scientific classification
- Kingdom: Animalia
- Phylum: Arthropoda
- Clade: Pancrustacea
- Class: Insecta
- Order: Lepidoptera
- Family: Pterophoridae
- Genus: Ochyrotica
- Species: O. moheliensis

Binomial name
- Ochyrotica moheliensis Gibeaux, 1994

Species of plume moth

Ochyrotica moheliensis is a moth of the family Pterophoridae. It is known from the Comoros.
