= Stangeia distantia =

Scientific classification
- Kingdom: Animalia
- Phylum: Arthropoda
- Class: Insecta
- Order: Lepidoptera
- Family: Pterophoridae
- Genus: Stangeia
- Species: S. distantia

Binomial name
- Stangeia distantia Clarke, 1986

Species of plume moth

Stangeia distantia is a moth species of the family Pterophoridae. It was first described in 1986 by J. F. Gates Clarke, and is known from Fatu-Hiva in the Marquesas Archipelago.

== Description ==
The species has a wingspan of 11–12 millimetres (0.43–0.47 in). Head, abdomen and thorax are olive buff, with exception of a buff posterior part of the thorax and some buff longitudinal lines on the abdomen. The antennae are black with white spots; the legs ochreous white with longitudinal black lines. The forewings, olive buff in ground colour, have a narrow white edge to the outer costa. The hindwings are fuscous.
