= Cosmoclostis lanceatus =

Scientific classification
- Kingdom: Animalia
- Phylum: Arthropoda
- Class: Insecta
- Order: Lepidoptera
- Family: Pterophoridae
- Genus: Cosmoclostis
- Species: C. lanceatus

Binomial name
- Cosmoclostis lanceatus (Arenberger, 1985)

Synonyms
- Pselnophorus lanceatus Arenberger, 1986; Diacrotricha lanceata; Diacrotricha lanceatus

Species of plume moth

Cosmoclostis lanceatus is a moth of the family Pterophoridae. It is known from Oman, Saudi Arabia and Yemen.
