= Cosmoclostis gmelina =

Scientific classification
- Kingdom: Animalia
- Phylum: Arthropoda
- Clade: Pancrustacea
- Class: Insecta
- Order: Lepidoptera
- Family: Pterophoridae
- Genus: Cosmoclostis
- Species: C. gmelina

Binomial name
- Cosmoclostis gmelina S.L. Hao, H.H. Li & C.S. Wu, 2004

Species of plume moth

Cosmoclostis gmelina is a moth of the family Pterophoridae. It is found in Hainan, China.
