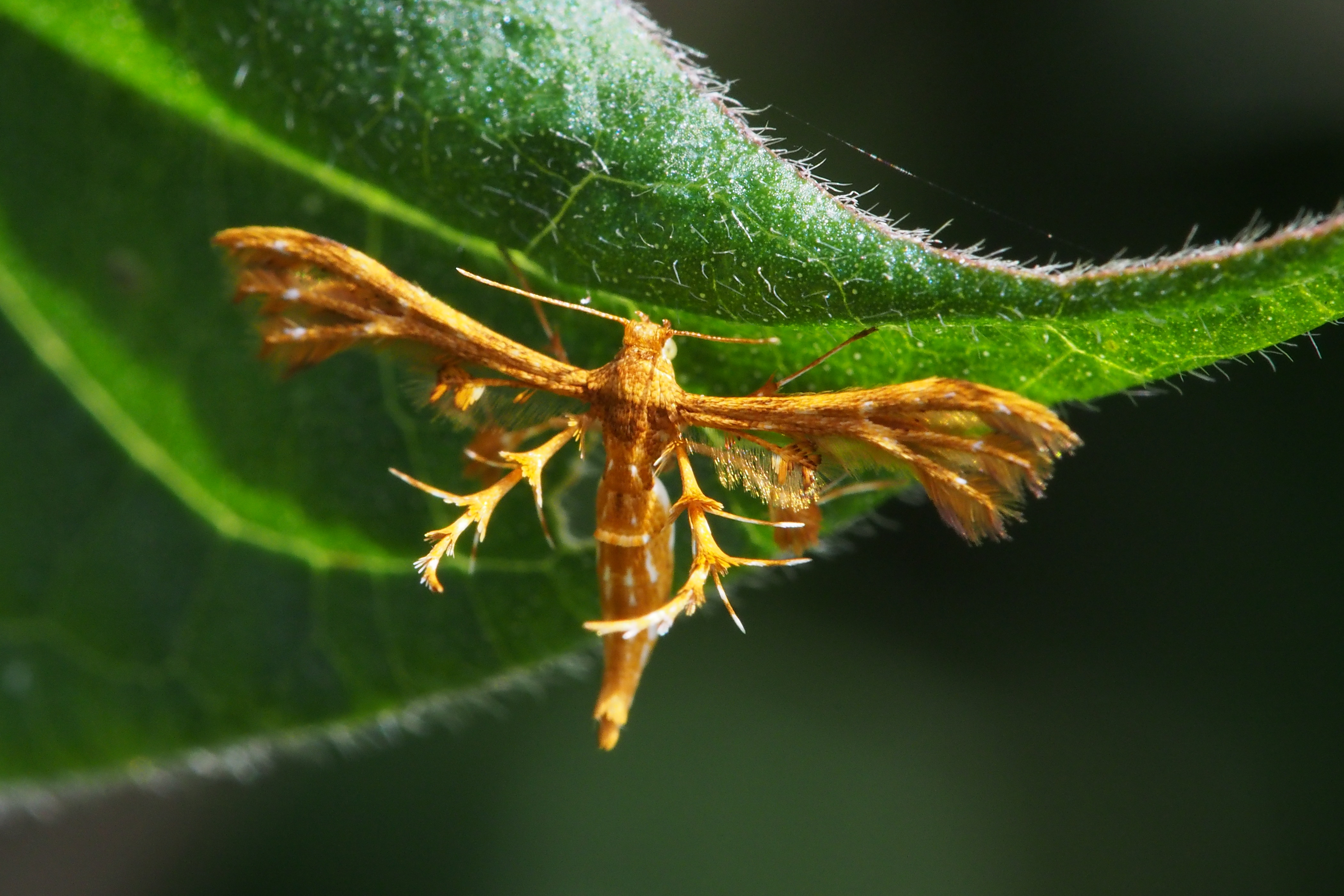

Scientific classification
- Domain: Eukaryota
- Kingdom: Animalia
- Phylum: Arthropoda
- Class: Insecta
- Order: Lepidoptera
- Family: Pterophoridae
- Genus: Deuterocopus; Zeller, 1852

Synonyms
- Leptodeuterocopus T. B. Fletcher, 1910; Deuteroscopus Hofmann, 1898 (misspelling)

= Deuterocopus =

Plume moth genus

Deuterocopus is a genus of moths in the family Pterophoridae. The genus was described by Philipp Christoph Zeller in 1852.

== Species ==
As of May 2023, the Catalogue of the Pterophoroidea of the World lists the following species for genus Deuterocopus:

- Deuterocopus albipunctatus T. B. Fletcher, 1910
- Deuterocopus alopecodes Meyrick, 1911
- Deuterocopus atrapex T. B. Fletcher, 1910
- Deuterocopus bathychasma T. B. Fletcher, 1910
- Deuterocopus deltoptilus Meyrick, 1930
- Deuterocopus devosi Gielis, 2003
- Deuterocopus famulus Meyrick, 1908
- Deuterocopus honoratus Meyrick, 1921
- Deuterocopus issikii Yano, 1963
- Deuterocopus melanota T. B. Fletcher, 1910
- Deuterocopus papuaensis Gielis & de Vos, 2007
- Deuterocopus planeta Meyrick, 1908
- Deuterocopus ritsemae Walsingham, 1884
- Deuterocopus socotranus Rebel, 1907
- Deuterocopus tengstroemi Zeller, 1852
