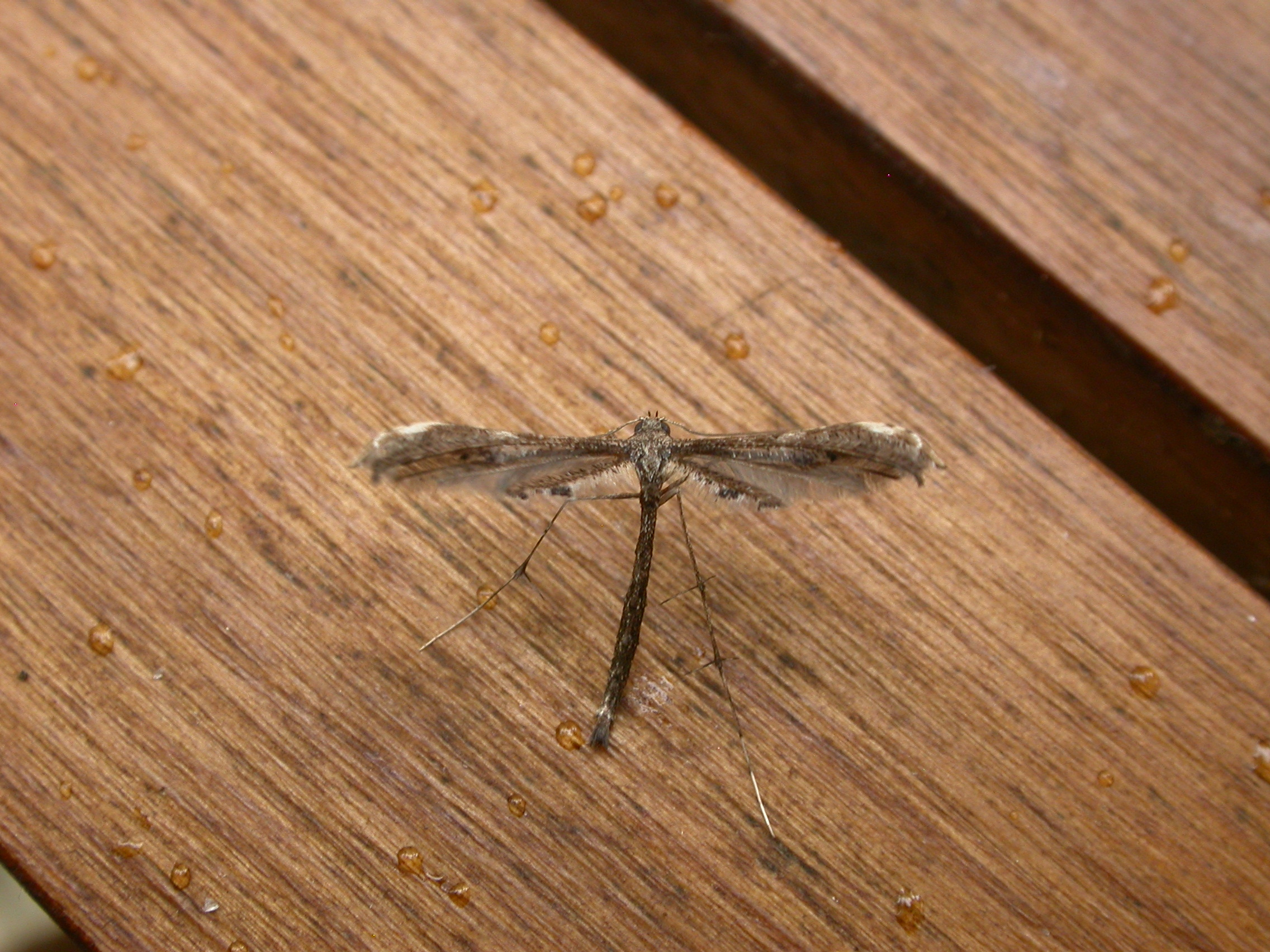

Scientific classification
- Kingdom: Animalia
- Phylum: Arthropoda
- Clade: Pancrustacea
- Class: Insecta
- Order: Lepidoptera
- Family: Pterophoridae
- Genus: Trichoptilus
- Species: T. inclitus

Binomial name
- Trichoptilus inclitus T.P. Lucas, 1892

= Trichoptilus inclitus =

Species of plume moth

Trichoptilus inclitus is a moth of the family Pterophoridae that is found in Australia.
