= Ochyrotica celebica =

Scientific classification
- Kingdom: Animalia
- Phylum: Arthropoda
- Class: Insecta
- Order: Lepidoptera
- Family: Pterophoridae
- Genus: Ochyrotica
- Species: O. celebica

Binomial name
- Ochyrotica celebica Arenberger, 1988

Species of plume moth

Ochyrotica celebica is a moth of the family Pterophoridae. It is found on Sulawesi, an island in Indonesia.

The wingspan is about 15 mm.
