= Trichoptilus pygmaeus =

Scientific classification
- Kingdom: Animalia
- Phylum: Arthropoda
- Class: Insecta
- Order: Lepidoptera
- Family: Pterophoridae
- Genus: Trichoptilus
- Species: T. pygmaeus

Binomial name
- Trichoptilus pygmaeus Walsingham, 1880

Species of plume moth

Trichoptilus pygmaeus is a moth of the family Pterophoridae. It is found in North America, including California, Florida and British Columbia.

The wingspan is about 10 millimetres (0.39 in). The head and thorax are pale fawn in color. The abdomen is whitish, with a tinge of fawn color on the sides and above posteriorly. The forewings are very pale fawn color, dusted with fuscous brown scales along the costa, especially above the base of the fissure and near the base of the hind margin. Two indistinct white stripes cross the lobes of the forewings, one beyond and the other before the middle, cutting the fawn-colored fringes on each side. The hindwings are pale greyish-brown, with cinereous fringes interrupted with white behind and at the apex.

The larvae feed on Chrysopsis scabrella and Arctostaphylos columbiana. They feed on the young leaves and bracts of unopened flowers of Chrysopsis species.

== Taxonomy ==
Trichoptilus potentellus is sometimes listed as a synonym of Trichoptilus pygmaeus.
