= Trichoptilus scythrodes =

Scientific classification
- Kingdom: Animalia
- Phylum: Arthropoda
- Clade: Pancrustacea
- Class: Insecta
- Order: Lepidoptera
- Family: Pterophoridae
- Genus: Trichoptilus
- Species: T. scythrodes

Binomial name
- Trichoptilus scythrodes Meyrick, 1886

Species of plume moth

Trichoptilus scythrodes is a moth of the family Pterophoridae that can be found in Australia, including New South Wales and South Australia.

== Original description ==
(wingspan male, female 12–13 millimetres (0.47–0.51 in)) Head and thorax brownish ochreous, more or less mixed with white. Palpi ochreous mixed with white, terminal joint white, with base and apex dark fuscous, 2nd joint reaching middle of face. Antennae whitish, annulated with dark fuscous with a blackish line above. Abdomen ochreous, longitudinally striated with irregular obscure white and black lines, apex in male with two obliquely ascending divergent hair-pencils. Tibiae white, longitudinally striped with black, posterior tibiae with dark fuscous median and apical bands, all tarsi with broad blackish bands at apex of joints. Fore wings cleft from before middle, segments linear; brownish ochreous, with scattered dark fuscous scales; one or two white spots on inner margin, and sometimes a suffused irregular white central streak from base to cleft; 1st segment suffused with darker fuscous, with a white bar before its middle and another towards apex, sometimes also a white spot at base; 2nd segment with two corresponding but less distinct white bars; cilia grey, on costa dark grey barred with white opposite fasciae and white at base towards apex, on lower margin of 1st segment mixed with white and with some black scales in middle, on upper margin of 2nd segment with a row of black scales towards middle, on lower margin of 2nd segment with five spots of black scales, first before cleft, last subapical, and two or three white bars, last anal. Hind wings cleft firstly from before one-third, secondly from base, segments linear; dark fuscous; cilia grey, 3rd segment with a fringe of white hair-scales on inner margin from base to middle, without black scales. So far as my specimens show, this and the following species are quite destitute of the black scales in the dorsal cilia of the hind wings, possessed by all the other species of the genus, but they certainly do not admit of generic separation; this species is readily recognised by the distinct white markings. Sydney, New South Wales; Port Lincoln, South Australia; four specimens in November and April.

— Original description by Edward Meyrick
