= Ochyrotica taiwanica =

Scientific classification
- Kingdom: Animalia
- Phylum: Arthropoda
- Clade: Pancrustacea
- Class: Insecta
- Order: Lepidoptera
- Family: Pterophoridae
- Genus: Ochyrotica
- Species: O. taiwanica

Binomial name
- Ochyrotica taiwanica Gielis, 1990

Species of plume moth

Ochyrotica taiwanica is a moth in the family Pterophoridae. It is found in Taiwan.

The wingspan is about 15 mm. Adults have been recorded in November and January.
