= Ochyrotica salomonica =

Scientific classification
- Kingdom: Animalia
- Phylum: Arthropoda
- Class: Insecta
- Order: Lepidoptera
- Family: Pterophoridae
- Genus: Ochyrotica
- Species: O. salomonica

Binomial name
- Ochyrotica salomonica Arenberger, 1991

Species of plume moth

Ochyrotica salomonica is a moth of the family Pterophoridae. It is known from New Guinea and the Solomon Islands.
