= Cosmoclostis chalconota =

Scientific classification
- Kingdom: Animalia
- Phylum: Arthropoda
- Class: Insecta
- Order: Lepidoptera
- Family: Pterophoridae
- Genus: Cosmoclostis
- Species: C. chalconota

Binomial name
- Cosmoclostis chalconota T. B. Fletcher, 1947

Species of plume moth

Cosmoclostis chalconota is a moth of the family Pterophoridae. It was described by Thomas Bainbrigge Fletcher in 1947 and is known from Uganda.
