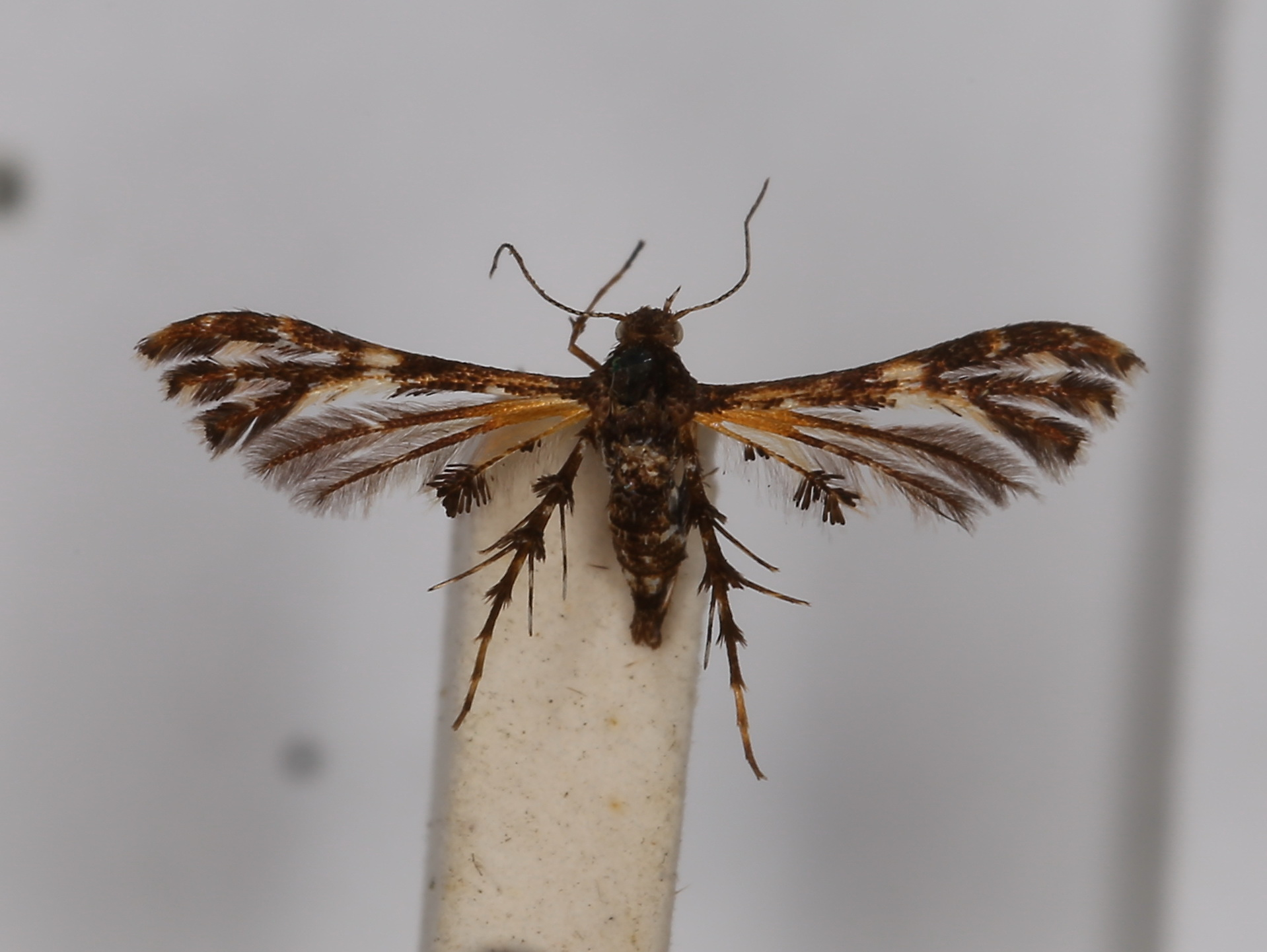
- Deuterocopus honoratus Meyrick, 1921, male holotype, Natural History Museum specimen NHMUK010919172

Scientific classification
- Kingdom: Animalia
- Phylum: Arthropoda
- Class: Insecta
- Order: Lepidoptera
- Family: Pterophoridae
- Genus: Deuterocopus
- Species: D. honoratus

Binomial name
- Deuterocopus honoratus Meyrick, 1921

= Deuterocopus honoratus =

Species of plume moth

Deuterocopus honoratus is a moth of the family Pterophoridae. It is found in Queensland, Australia.

== Original description ==
(wingspan male 11 mm) Head, thorax, abdomen whity-brownish suffusedly irrorated blackish, margins of abdominal segments slightly marked white on dorsum, ventral surface snow-white with dark ante-median band. Forewings cleft firstly to 3/5, second segment cleft nearly to 1/4 from base; coppery-brownish suffusedly irrorated blackish; a white dot on dorsum at 1/4; an oval white spot in disc before cleft, and small dorsal mark beneath and almost confluent with it; some scattered white scales indicating bars at 1/3 and 2/3 of first segment, and middle of other two: cilia dark grey, blackish spots edged by whitish patches at apex of each segment, ochreous-whitish patches on middle of lower margin of first segment and on dorsum towards cleft. Hindwings dark fuscous, basal third light orange-fulvous; cilia dark grey, third segment with black dorsal scaletooth before middle, and large black scale-projection occupying both sides of apical third. Queensland, Brisbane, March (Dodd); 1 ex., Wals. Coll. (19403).

— Original description by Edward Meyrick

== Modern records ==
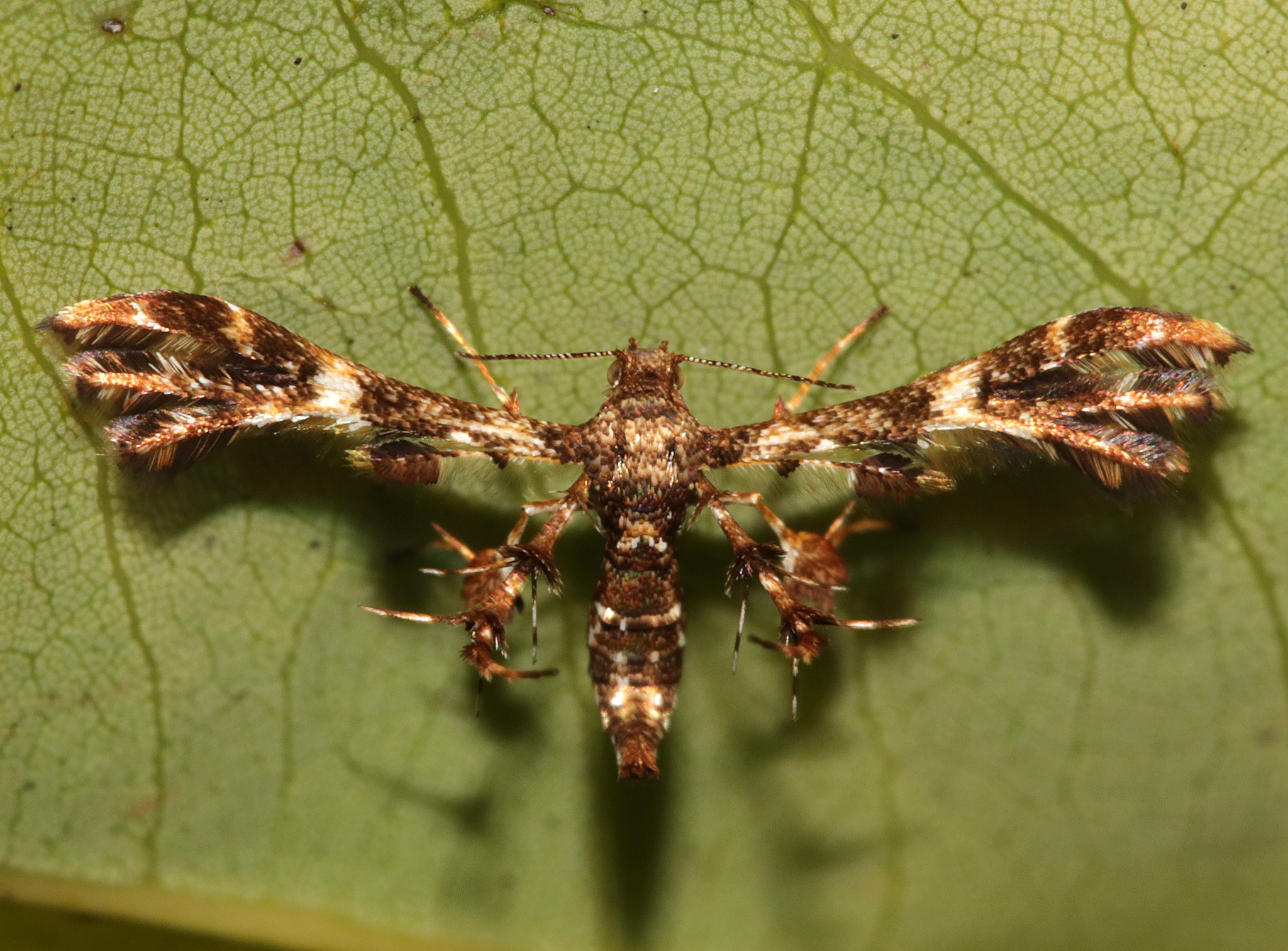
Deuterocopus honoratus Meyrick, 1921, adult, Bonville, NSW, Australia, 24 June 2024

Deuterocopus honoratus is a rarely recorded species, known from 2024 observations in the south-east of Queensland and north-east of New South Wales.
