= Trichoptilus subtilis =

Scientific classification
- Kingdom: Animalia
- Phylum: Arthropoda
- Class: Insecta
- Order: Lepidoptera
- Family: Pterophoridae
- Genus: Trichoptilus
- Species: T. subtilis

Binomial name
- Trichoptilus subtilis Rebel, 1907

Synonyms
- Trichoptilus maceratus Meyrick, 1909; Megalorhipida subtilis (Rebel, 1907)

Species of plume moth

Trichoptilus subtilis is a moth of the family Pterophoridae that is known from South Africa. The species was first described by Hans Rebel in 1907.
