= Gypsochares =

Scientific classification
- Kingdom: Animalia
- Phylum: Arthropoda
- Class: Insecta
- Order: Lepidoptera
- Family: Pterophoridae
- Tribe: Oidaematophorini
- Genus: Gypsochares; Meyrick, 1890

Plume moth genus

Gypsochares is a genus of moths in the family Pterophoridae.

== Species ==
- Gypsochares astragalotes Meyrick, 1909
- Gypsochares aulotes Meyrick, 1911
- Gypsochares baptodactylus (Zeller, 1850)
- Gypsochares bigoti Gibeaux & J. Nel, 1989
- Gypsochares catharotes (Meyrick, 1908)
- Gypsochares kukti Arenberger, 1989
- Gypsochares kyraensis (Ustjuzhanin, 1996)
- Gypsochares londti Ustjuzhanin et Kovtunovich, 2010
- Gypsochares nielswolffi Gielis & Arenberger, 1992
