= Deuterocopus papuaensis =

Scientific classification
- Kingdom: Animalia
- Phylum: Arthropoda
- Class: Insecta
- Order: Lepidoptera
- Family: Pterophoridae
- Genus: Deuterocopus
- Species: D. papuaensis

Binomial name
- Deuterocopus papuaensis Gielis & De Vos, 2007

Species of plume moth

Deuterocopus papuaensis is a moth of the family Pterophoridae. It is found in New Guinea.
