= Ochyrotica diehli =

Scientific classification
- Kingdom: Animalia
- Phylum: Arthropoda
- Class: Insecta
- Order: Lepidoptera
- Family: Pterophoridae
- Genus: Ochyrotica
- Species: O. diehli

Binomial name
- Ochyrotica diehli Arenberger, 1997

Species of plume moth

Ochyrotica diehli is a moth of the family Pterophoridae.
