= Cosmoclostis schouteni =

Scientific classification
- Kingdom: Animalia
- Phylum: Arthropoda
- Class: Insecta
- Order: Lepidoptera
- Family: Pterophoridae
- Genus: Cosmoclostis
- Species: C. schouteni

Binomial name
- Cosmoclostis schouteni Gielis, 1990

Species of plume moth

Cosmoclostis schouteni is a moth of the family Pterophoridae. It is known from Ivory Coast.
