= Deuterocopus bathychasma =

Scientific classification
- Domain: Eukaryota
- Kingdom: Animalia
- Phylum: Arthropoda
- Class: Insecta
- Order: Lepidoptera
- Family: Pterophoridae
- Genus: Deuterocopus
- Species: D. bathychasma

Binomial name
- Deuterocopus bathychasma T. B. Fletcher, 1910

Synonyms
- Deuterocopus bathychasmus

Species of plume moth

Deuterocopus bathychasma is a moth of the family Pterophoridae described by Thomas Bainbrigge Fletcher in 1910. It can be found on Sumbawa in Indonesia.
