= Ochyrotica gielisi =

Scientific classification
- Kingdom: Animalia
- Phylum: Arthropoda
- Class: Insecta
- Order: Lepidoptera
- Family: Pterophoridae
- Genus: Ochyrotica
- Species: O. gielisi

Binomial name
- Ochyrotica gielisi Arenberger, 1990

Species of plume moth

Ochyrotica gielisi is a moth of the family Pterophoridae. It is known from Panama.

The wingspan is about 16 mm.
