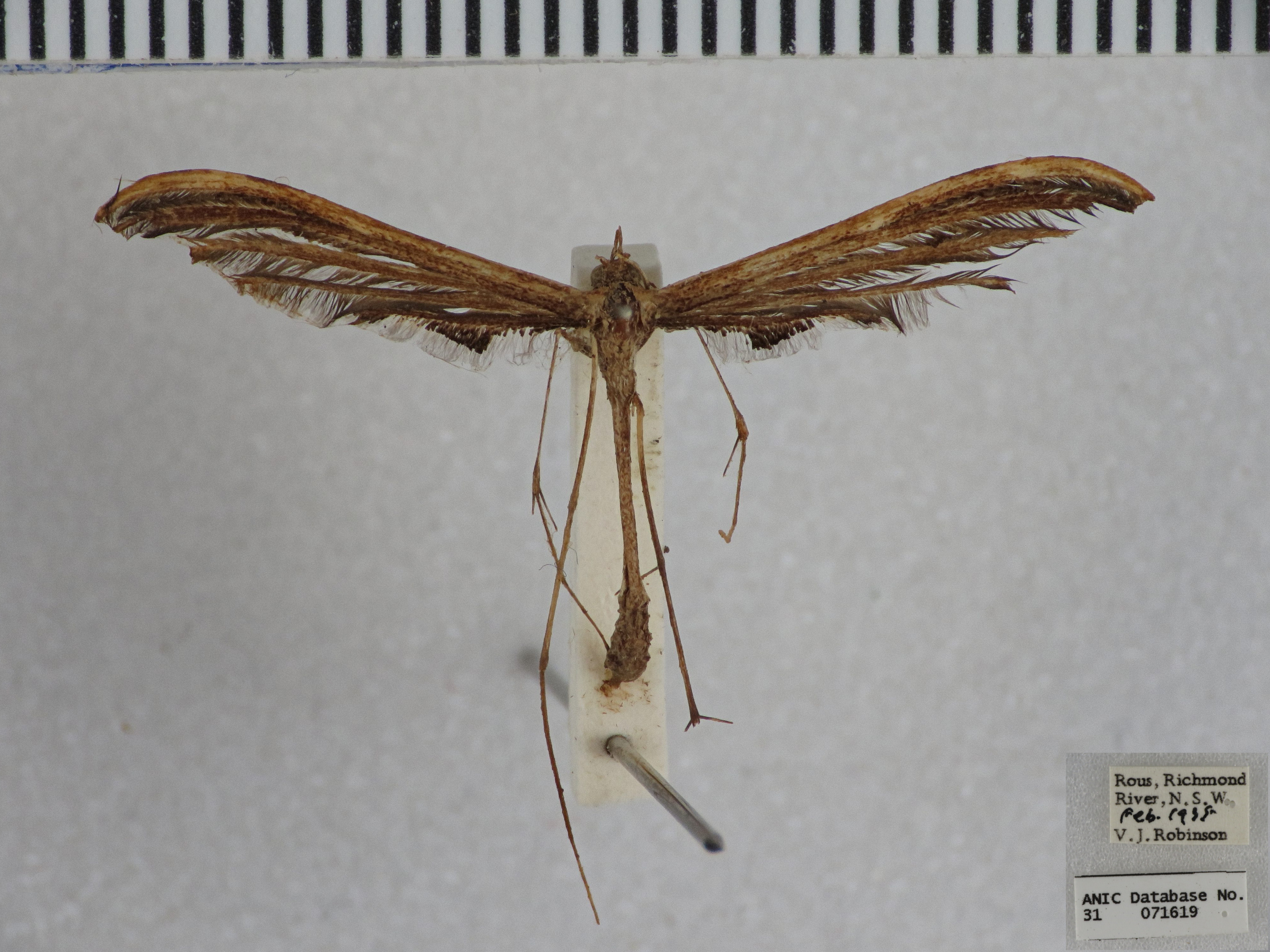
- Tetraschalis arachnodes

Scientific classification
- Kingdom: Animalia
- Phylum: Arthropoda
- Class: Insecta
- Order: Lepidoptera
- Family: Pterophoridae
- Subfamily: Pterophorinae
- Tribe: Tetraschalini
- Genus: Tetraschalis; Meyrick, 1887

Synonyms
- Xenopterophora Hori, 1933

= Tetraschalis =

Plume moth genus

Tetraschalis is a genus of moths in the family Pterophoridae.

== Species ==
As of version 1.1.23.125, the Catalogue of the Pterophoroidea of the World lists the following species for genus Tetraschalis:

- Tetraschalis arachnodes Meyrick, 1887
- Tetraschalis deltozela Meyrick, 1924
- Tetraschalis ischnites Meyrick, 1908
- Tetraschalis lemurodes Meyrick, 1907
- Tetraschalis mikado (Hori, 1933)
- Tetraschalis ochrias Meyrick, 1908
