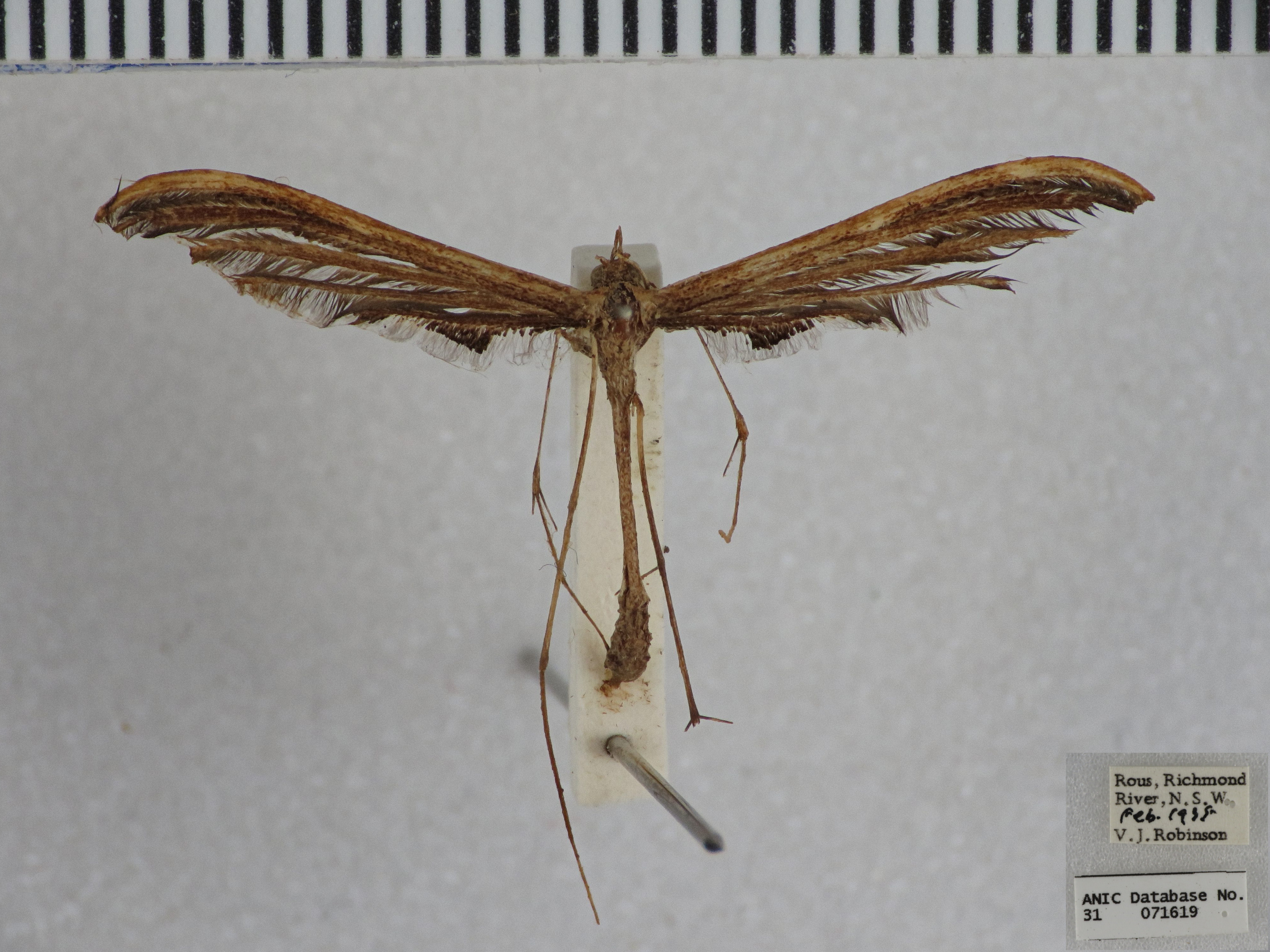

Scientific classification
- Kingdom: Animalia
- Phylum: Arthropoda
- Class: Insecta
- Order: Lepidoptera
- Family: Pterophoridae
- Genus: Tetraschalis
- Species: T. arachnodes

Binomial name
- Tetraschalis arachnodes Meyrick, 1887

= Tetraschalis arachnodes =

Species of plume moth

Tetraschalis arachnodes is a moth of the family Pterophoridae. It is found in Australia, including New South Wales.

The wingspan is about 20 mm.
