= Cosmoclostis quadriquadra =

Scientific classification
- Kingdom: Animalia
- Phylum: Arthropoda
- Class: Insecta
- Order: Lepidoptera
- Family: Pterophoridae
- Genus: Cosmoclostis
- Species: C. quadriquadra

Binomial name
- Cosmoclostis quadriquadra Walsingham, 1900

Species of plume moth

Cosmoclostis quadriquadra is a moth of the family Pterophoridae. It is found on Christmas Island, a territory of Australia in the Indian Ocean.

The wingspan is 11–13 mm. The antennae are white and the head is pale rust-brown above, with a white face. The thorax is yellowish white anteriorly and rusty-brown posteriorly. The underside is shining white, tinged with yellowish at the sides. The forewings are yellowish white. The hindwings are bronzy grey.
