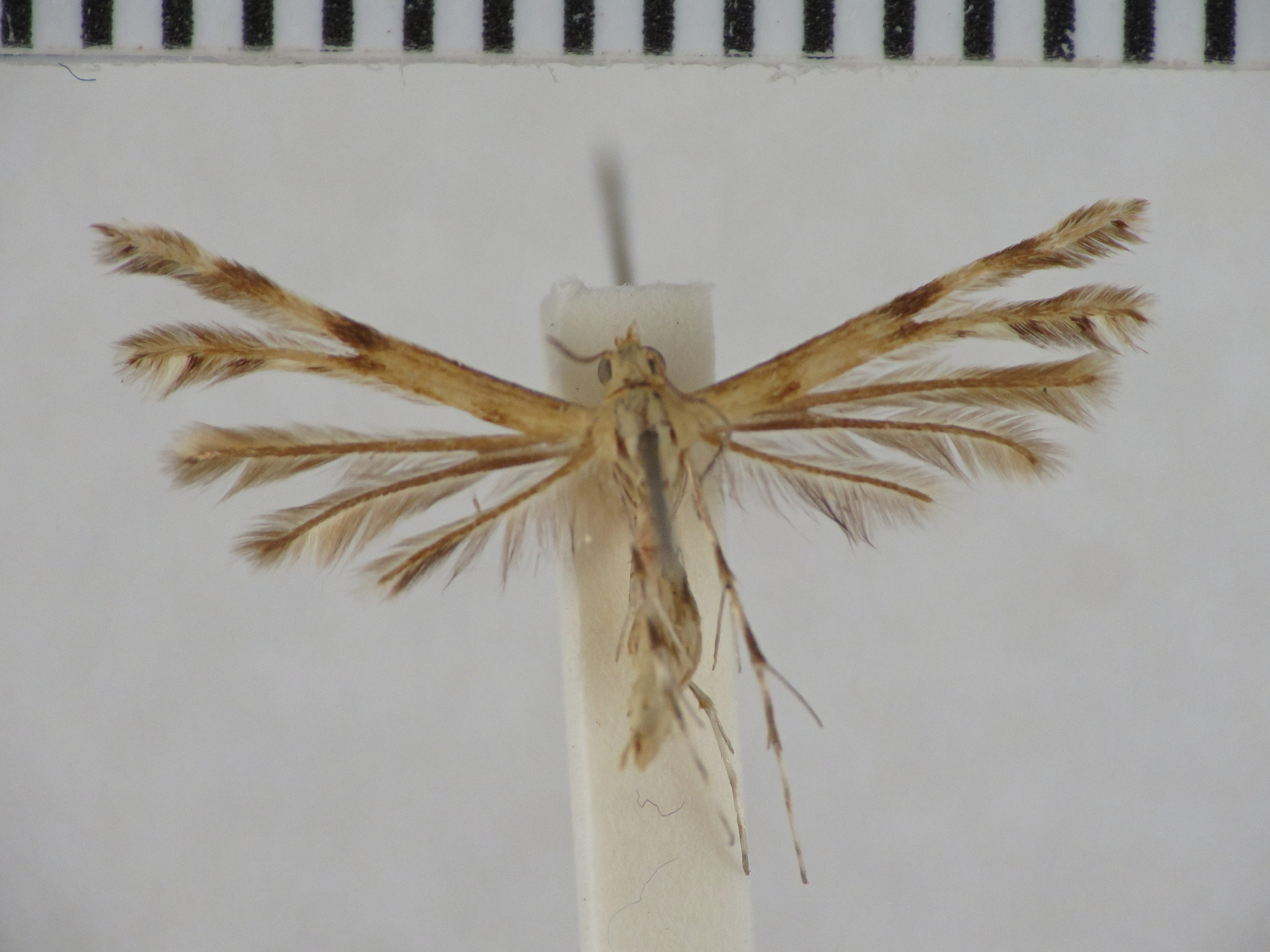

Scientific classification
- Kingdom: Animalia
- Phylum: Arthropoda
- Clade: Pancrustacea
- Class: Insecta
- Order: Lepidoptera
- Family: Pterophoridae
- Genus: Trichoptilus
- Species: T. ceramodes

Binomial name
- Trichoptilus ceramodes Meyrick, 1886

= Trichoptilus ceramodes =

Species of plume moth

Trichoptilus ceramodes is a moth of the family Pterophoridae that is found in Australia, including New South Wales and South Australia.

== Original description ==
(wingspan male, female 14 millimetres (0.55 in)) Head and thorax light ochreous. Antennae ochreous, with a blackish line above. Palpi pale ochreous, base white, second joint reaching above middle of face. Abdomen light ochreous, with an obscure interrupted blackish line on each side of the back; apex in male with two white obliquely ascending tolerably appressed hair pencils, valves small. Legs white, longitudinally lined with dark fuscous; posterior pair banded with brownish ochreous on middle and apex of tibiae and apex of 1st joint of tarsi. Fore wings cleft from middle, segments linear; light ochreous; a small brown spot near inner margin before one-fourth; a cloudy fuscous spot on base of 2nd segment; 1st segment with broad cloudy fuscous basal, median and apical bands; costal cilia grey, with white spots between the bands; rest of cilia grey, with a few whitish scales, a white bar at anal angle, and another on lower margin before middle of 2nd segment. Hind wings cleft firstly from before one-third, secondly from base, segments linear; rather dark fuscous; cilia light ochreous-greyish, inner margin of 3rd segment with a row of white hair scales, without black scales. This species appears to be destitute of black scales in the cilia of both wings. Sydney, New South Wales; Port Lincoln, South Australia; two specimens in September and November.

— Original description by Edward Meyrick
