= Ochyrotica yanoi =

Scientific classification
- Kingdom: Animalia
- Phylum: Arthropoda
- Class: Insecta
- Order: Lepidoptera
- Family: Pterophoridae
- Genus: Ochyrotica
- Species: O. yanoi

Binomial name
- Ochyrotica yanoi Arenberger, 1988

Species of plume moth

Ochyrotica yanoi is a moth of the family Pterophoridae. It is known from New Guinea, China (Hainan and Hong Kong), Taiwan, Vietnam and the Ryukyu Islands, the Philippines and India.
