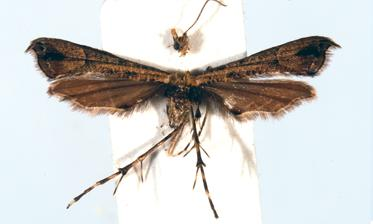
- Ochyrotica bjoernstadti

Scientific classification
- Domain: Eukaryota
- Kingdom: Animalia
- Phylum: Arthropoda
- Class: Insecta
- Order: Lepidoptera
- Family: Pterophoridae
- Subfamily: Ochyroticinae; Wasserthal, 1970
- Genus: Ochyrotica; Walsingham, 1891

Synonyms
- Steganodactyla Walsingham, 1891

= Ochyrotica =

Sole plume moth genus in subfamily Ochyroticinae

Ochyrotica is a genus of moths in the family Pterophoridae and only genus in the Ochyroticinae subfamily. Ochyrotica was described by Lord Walsingham in 1891 and the subfamily Ochyroticinae was described by Lutz Thilo Wasserthal in 1970.

== Species ==
As of version 1.1.23.125, the Catalogue of the Pterophoroidea of the World lists the following species for genus Ochyrotica:

- Ochyrotica africana (Bigot, 1969)
- Ochyrotica bjoernstadti Gielis, 2008
- Ochyrotica bonitae Gielis, 2016
- Ochyrotica borneoica Gielis, 1988
- Ochyrotica breviapex Gielis, 1990
- Ochyrotica buergersi Gaede, 1916
- Ochyrotica celebica Arenberger, 1988
- Ochyrotica concursa (Walsingham, 1891)
- Ochyrotica connexiva (Walsingham, 1891)
- Ochyrotica cretosa (Durrant, 1915)
- Ochyrotica diehli Arenberger, 1997
- Ochyrotica fasciata Walsingham, 1891
- Ochyrotica gielisi Arenberger, 1990
- Ochyrotica javanica Gielis, 1988
- Ochyrotica juratea Gielis, 2011
- Ochyrotica koteka Arenberger, 1992
- Ochyrotica kurandica Arenberger, 1988
- Ochyrotica mexicana Arenberger, 1990
- Ochyrotica misoolica Gielis, 1988
- Ochyrotica moheliensis Gibeaux, 1994
- Ochyrotica omelkoi Ustjuzhanin & Kovtunovich, 2020
- Ochyrotica placozona Meyrick, 1921
- Ochyrotica pseudocretosa Gielis, 1991
- Ochyrotica rufa Arenberger, 1987
- Ochyrotica salomonica Arenberger, 1991
- Ochyrotica taiwanica Gielis, 1990
- Ochyrotica toxopeusi Gielis, 1988
- Ochyrotica willyi Gielis, 2011
- Ochyrotica yanoi Arenberger, 1988
- Ochyrotica zolotuhini Ustjuzhanin & Kovtunovich, 2010
