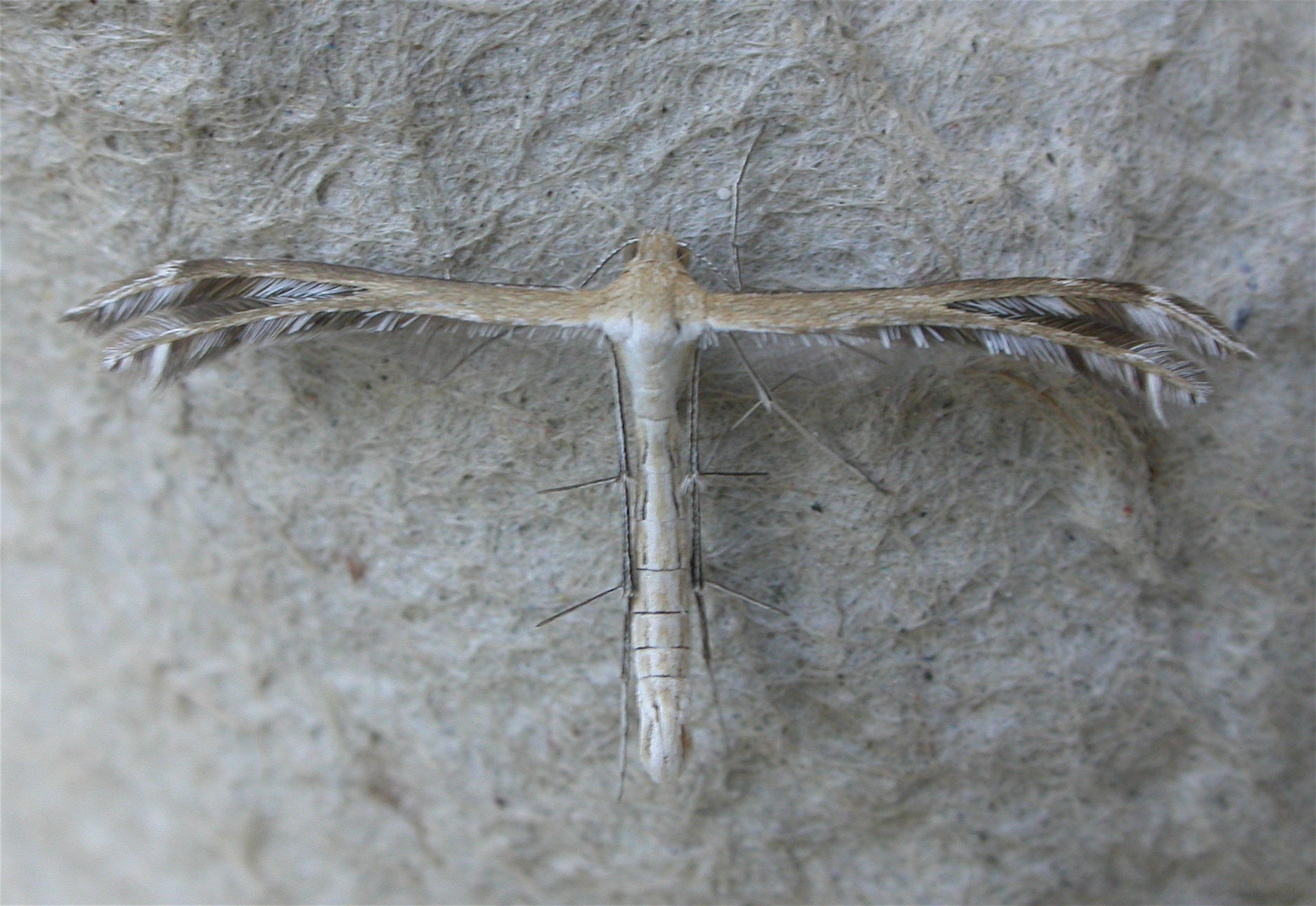

Scientific classification
- Kingdom: Animalia
- Phylum: Arthropoda
- Class: Insecta
- Order: Lepidoptera
- Family: Pterophoridae
- Genus: Stangeia
- Species: S. xerodes

Binomial name
- Stangeia xerodes Meyrick, 1886

Synonyms
- Buckleria xerodes T. B. Fletcher, 1920; Trichoptilus xerodes; Trichoptilus esakii Hori, 1936; Trichoptilus dryites Meyrick, 1936

= Stangeia xerodes =

Species of plume moth

Stangeia xerodes is a moth of the family Pterophoridae that is found in most of mainland Australia, the Ryukyu Islands, Java and Sri Lanka.

The wingspan is about 10 millimetres (0.39 in).

The larvae feed on Cleome, Cajanus cajan and Acacia. They are about 12 millimetres (0.47 in) long, cylindrical and moderately stout. The head is yellowish with an orange tinge, while the colour of the other segments is uniform pale yellow.
