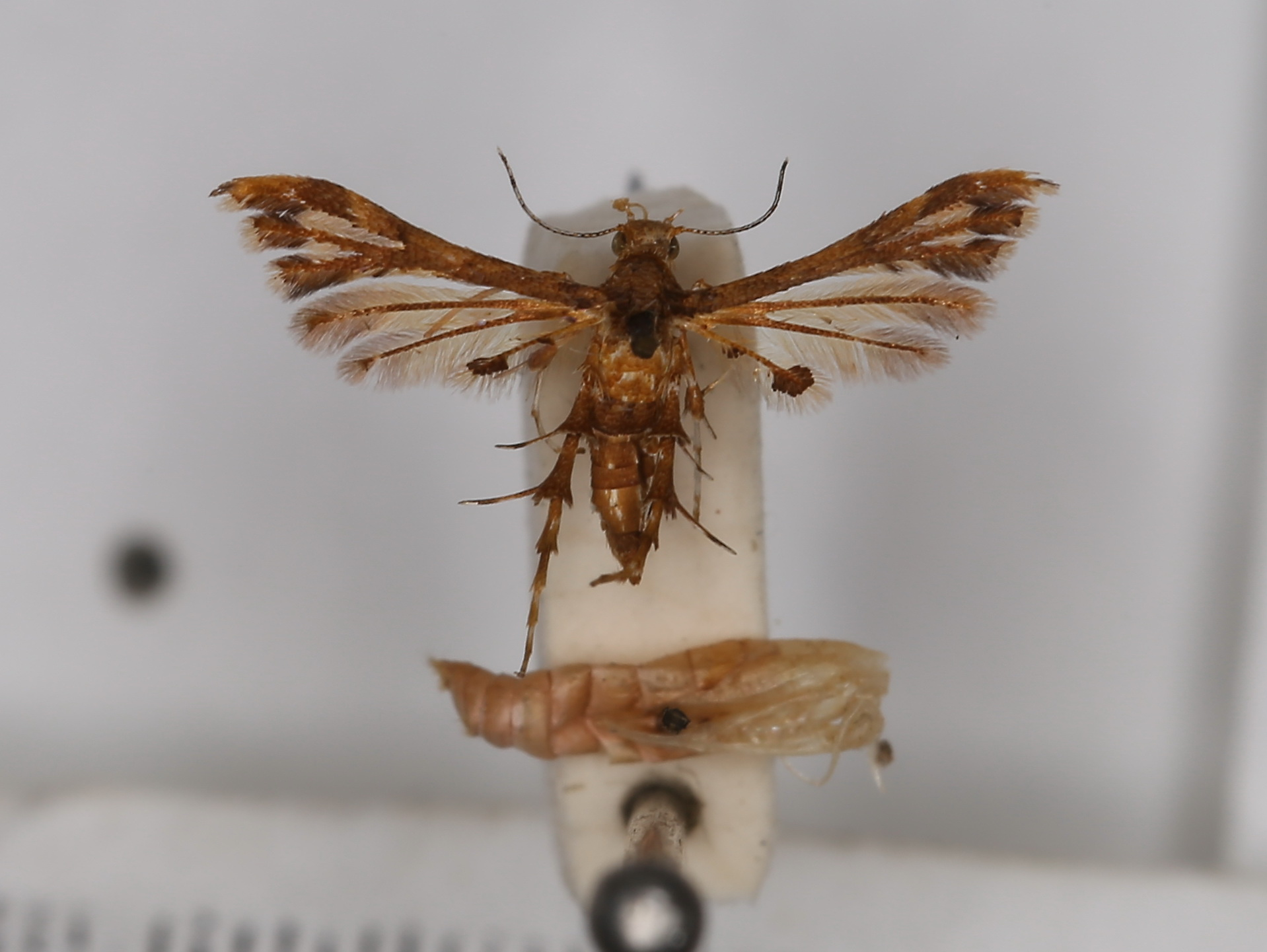
- Deuterocopus socotranus Rebel, 1907, Natural History Museum specimen NHMUK 010919180

Scientific classification
- Kingdom: Animalia
- Phylum: Arthropoda
- Clade: Pancrustacea
- Class: Insecta
- Order: Lepidoptera
- Family: Pterophoridae
- Genus: Deuterocopus
- Species: D. socotranus

Binomial name
- Deuterocopus socotranus Rebel, 1907

Synonyms
- Deuterocopus jacksoni Walsingham (nomen nudum); Deuterocopus mathewi Walsingham (nomen nudum); Deuterocopus viticola Meyrick, 1911; Deuterocopus triannulatus Meyrick, 1913; Deuterocopus henrioti Bigot & Boireau, 2006

= Deuterocopus socotranus =

Species of plume moth

Deuterocopus socotranus is a moth of the family Pterophoridae. It is found from India and Sri Lanka to Taiwan and Japan and through south-east Asia to New Guinea and Australia, where it is found from Townsville to Brisbane in Queensland. It is also present in Africa (including Nigeria and Malawi), Oman and Yemen.

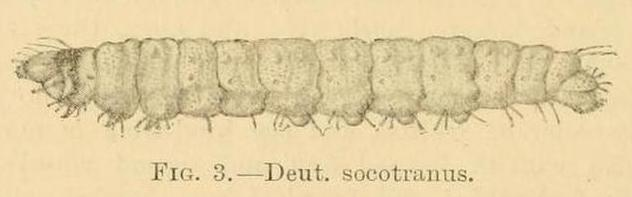
Caterpillar

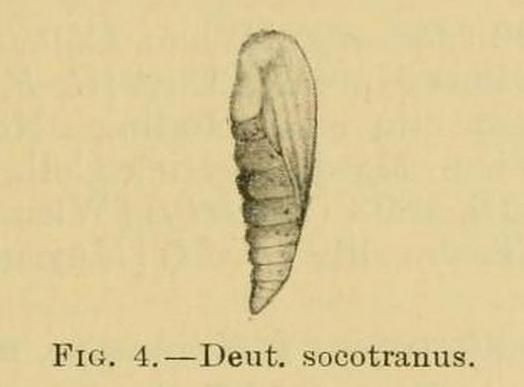
Pupa

The wingspan is about 20 mm. The wings are orange, with multiple lobes.

Larvae have been recorded on Vitis lanata, Vitis quadrangularis, Vitis quinquangularis and Cayratia trifolia.
