= Trichoptilus regalis =

Scientific classification
- Kingdom: Animalia
- Phylum: Arthropoda
- Class: Insecta
- Order: Lepidoptera
- Family: Pterophoridae
- Genus: Trichoptilus
- Species: T. regalis

Binomial name
- Trichoptilus regalis T. B. Fletcher, 1909

Synonyms
- Trichoptilus chordites Meyrick, 1913; Oxyptilus chordites; Oxyptilus regalis Fletcher, 1909

Species of plume moth

Trichoptilus regalis is a moth of the family Pterophoridae. It was described by Thomas Bainbrigge Fletcher in 1909 and is found in Sri Lanka and India.

The larvae have been recorded feeding on Calycopteris floribunda.
