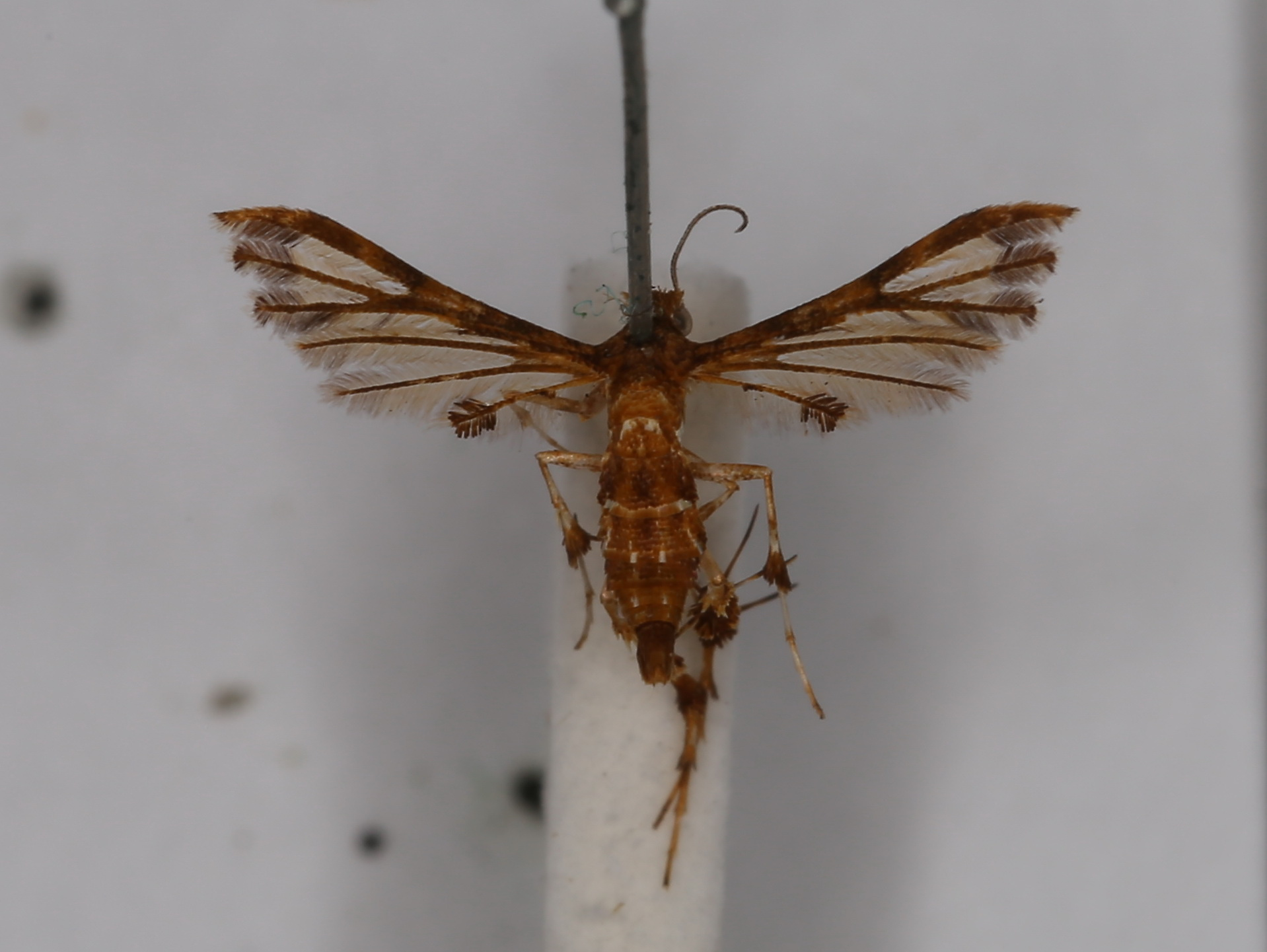
- Deuterocopus alopecodes Meyrick, 1911, syntype, Natural History Museum specimen NHMUK 010919179

Scientific classification
- Kingdom: Animalia
- Phylum: Arthropoda
- Class: Insecta
- Order: Lepidoptera
- Family: Pterophoridae
- Genus: Deuterocopus
- Species: D. alopecodes

Binomial name
- Deuterocopus alopecodes Meyrick, 1911

= Deuterocopus alopecodes =

Species of plume moth

Deuterocopus alopecodes is a moth of the family Pterophoridae. It is found in India.

The wingspan is 10–11 mm. The head and thorax are ferruginous sprinkled with dark fuscous, although the latter is whitish-yellow beneath. The antennae are black, lined and dotted with white. The forewings are ferruginous, variably irrorated (speckled) with dark fuscous. The hindwings are dark fuscous, although the third segment is ferruginous.

The larvae have been found on a vine species and this is presumed to be the host plant.
