= Platyptilia exaltatus =

Scientific classification
- Kingdom: Animalia
- Phylum: Arthropoda
- Clade: Pancrustacea
- Class: Insecta
- Order: Lepidoptera
- Family: Pterophoridae
- Genus: Platyptilia
- Species: P. exaltatus

Binomial name
- Platyptilia exaltatus (Zeller, 1867)

Synonyms
- Platyptilus exaltatus Zeller, 1867; Platyptilia dejecta Meyrick, 1932

Species of plume moth

Platyptilia exaltatus is a moth of the family Pterophoridae. It is found in India.
