= Cosmoclostis pesseuta =

Scientific classification
- Kingdom: Animalia
- Phylum: Arthropoda
- Clade: Pancrustacea
- Class: Insecta
- Order: Lepidoptera
- Family: Pterophoridae
- Genus: Cosmoclostis
- Species: C. pesseuta

Binomial name
- Cosmoclostis pesseuta Meyrick, 1906

Synonyms
- Cosmoclostis premnicola T. B. Fletcher, 1932

Species of plume moth

Cosmoclostis pesseuta is a species of moth of the family Pterophoridae. It is found in India and Sri Lanka but has also been recorded from New Guinea and the Bismarck Archipelago. Recently, it has also been collected in Queensland, Australia.

Larvae have been reared from Premna latifolia.
