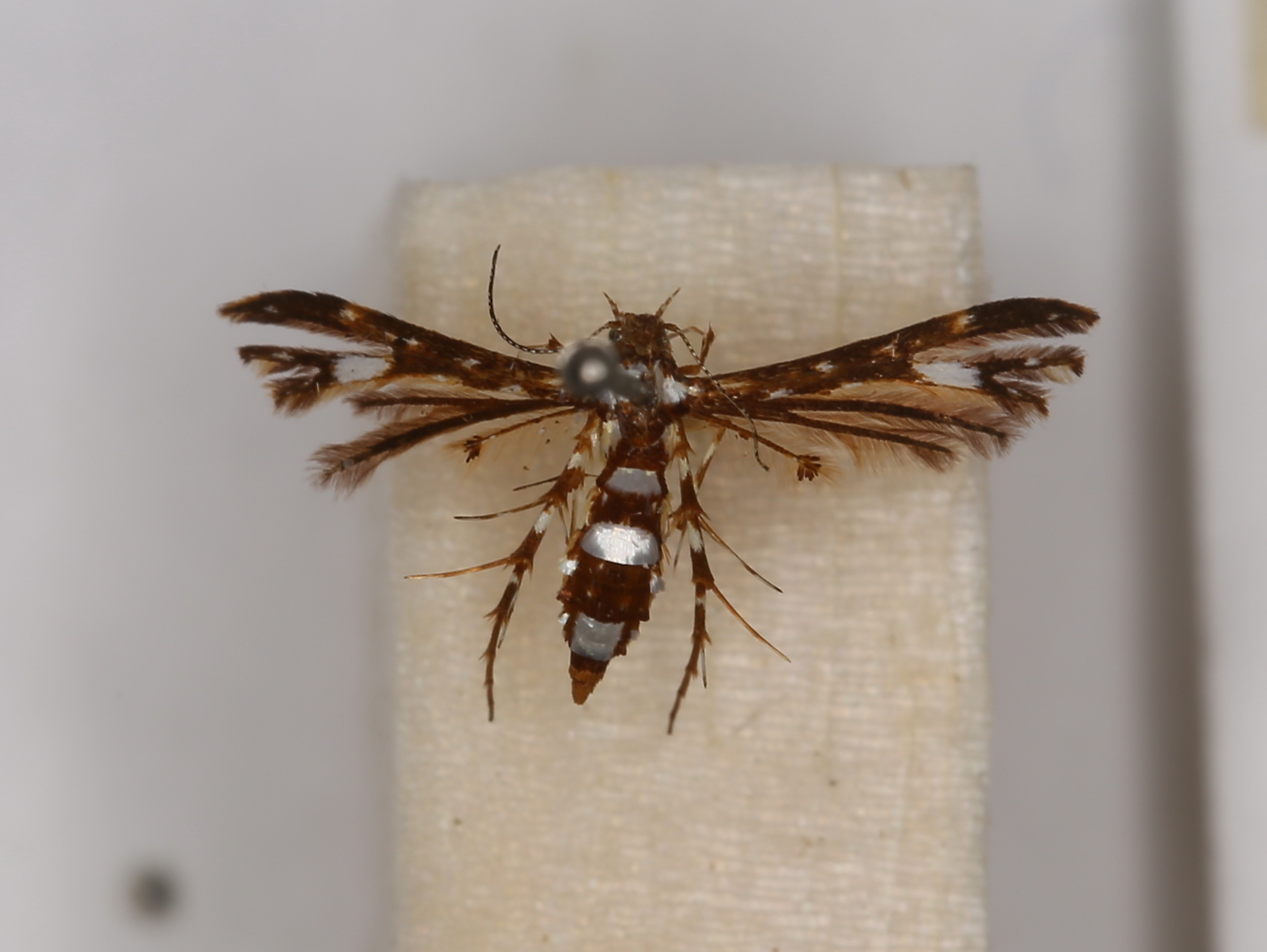
- Deuterocopus ritsemae Walsingham, 1884, Natural History Museum specimen NHMUK 010919175

Scientific classification
- Kingdom: Animalia
- Phylum: Arthropoda
- Class: Insecta
- Order: Lepidoptera
- Family: Pterophoridae
- Genus: Deuterocopus
- Species: D. ritsemae

Binomial name
- Deuterocopus ritsemae Walsingham, 1884

Synonyms
- Deuterocopus rubrodactylus Pagenstecher, 1900; Deuterocopus dorites Meyrick, 1913

= Deuterocopus ritsemae =

Species of plume moth

Deuterocopus ritsemae is a moth of the family Pterophoridae. It is found in India, Sri Lanka, Borneo, the Moluccas and New Guinea.

The wingspan is about 11 mm. The head is ferruginous and the antennae are dull ferruginous, delicately spotted along their upper side with white. The thorax is ferruginous with two ill-defined yellowish-white spots. The forewings are bright shining ferruginous. The hindwings are dark-ferruginous with a purplish tinge in the fringes.

The larvae have been found on Leea sambucina which is presumed to be the host plant.
