= Trichoptilus archaeodes =

Scientific classification
- Kingdom: Animalia
- Phylum: Arthropoda
- Class: Insecta
- Order: Lepidoptera
- Family: Pterophoridae
- Genus: Trichoptilus
- Species: T. archaeodes

Binomial name
- Trichoptilus archaeodes Meyrick, 1913

Synonyms
- Trichoptilus archeaodes; Trichoptilus archeodes

Species of plume moth

Trichoptilus archaeodes is a moth of the family Pterophoridae that can be found in India.
