= Tetraschalis ischnites =

Scientific classification
- Kingdom: Animalia
- Phylum: Arthropoda
- Class: Insecta
- Order: Lepidoptera
- Family: Pterophoridae
- Genus: Tetraschalis
- Species: T. ischnites

Binomial name
- Tetraschalis ischnites Meyrick, 1908

Species of plume moth

Tetraschalis ischnites is a moth of the family Pterophoridae. It is found in Assam, India.
