= Hellinsia lienigianus =

Scientific classification
- Kingdom: Animalia
- Phylum: Arthropoda
- Class: Insecta
- Order: Lepidoptera
- Family: Pterophoridae
- Genus: Hellinsia
- Species: H. lienigianus

Binomial name
- Hellinsia lienigianus (Zeller, 1852)

Synonyms
- List: Pterophorus lienigianus Zeller, 1852; Ovendenia lienigianus (Zeller, 1852); Oidaematophorus lienigianus; Pterophorus melinodactylus Herrich-Schäffer, 1855; Leioptilus serindibanus Moore, 1887; Leioptilus sericeodactylus Pagenstecher, 1900; Pterophorus victorianus Strand, 1913; Pterophorus hirosakianus Matsumura, 1931; Pterophorus lienigianus catharodactylus Caradja, 1920; Oidaematophorus mutuurai Yano, 1963; Pterophorus scarodactylus Becker, 1861

Species of plume moth

Hellinsia lienigianus is a moth of the family Pterophoridae which inhabits coastal areas, dry pastures and waste ground and is found in Africa, Asia, Australia and Europe. Also known as the mugwort plume, it was first described by Philipp Christoph Zeller in 1852.

== Description ==
The wingspan is 17–21 millimetres (0.67–0.83 in). Adults are on wing in July in Great Britain.

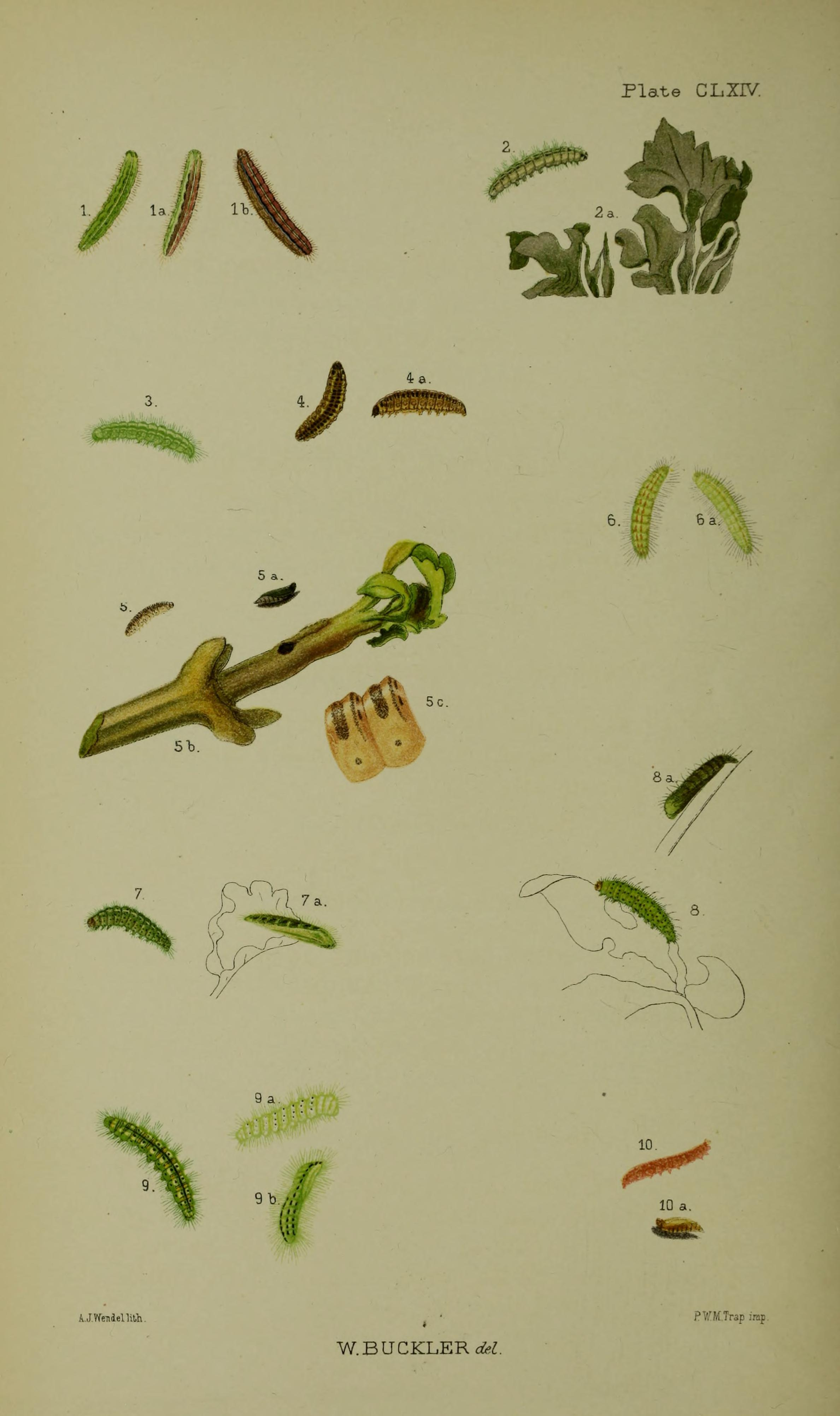
Figure 2 larva after final moult, Fig. 2a affected leaves of foodplant (mugwort) rolling up the wool beneath the leaves

The colour of the larvae vary from green to brown, and have sparse tufts of white hair along each side. They feed on various Asteraceae species, including mugwort (Artemisia vulgaris), sea wormwood (Artemisia maritima), Korean wormwood (Artemisia princeps), florist's daisy (Chrysanthemum morifolium), tansy (Tanacetum vulgare), common cocklebur (Xanthium strumarium), saltmarsh fleabane (Pluchea purpurascens), oxeye daisy (Leucanthemum vulgare) and Aspilia latifolia.

== Distribution ==
Hellinsia lienigianus is found in the Palearctic realm (from Europe to Russia, Korea, China and Japan), India, Southeast Asia, Africa, and Queensland in Australia.
