= Cosmoclostis leucomochla =

Scientific classification
- Kingdom: Animalia
- Phylum: Arthropoda
- Class: Insecta
- Order: Lepidoptera
- Family: Pterophoridae
- Genus: Cosmoclostis
- Species: C. leucomochla

Binomial name
- Cosmoclostis leucomochla T. B. Fletcher, 1947

Species of plume moth

Cosmoclostis leucomochla is a moth of the family Pterophoridae. It was described by Thomas Bainbrigge Fletcher from Sri Lanka. It was later also discovered in Myanmar and on Leyte in the Philippines.

The larvae feed on Gmelina arborea.
