= Ochyrotica concursa =

Scientific classification
- Kingdom: Animalia
- Phylum: Arthropoda
- Class: Insecta
- Order: Lepidoptera
- Family: Pterophoridae
- Genus: Ochyrotica
- Species: O. concursa

Binomial name
- Ochyrotica concursa (Walsingham, 1891)

Synonyms
- Steganodactyla concursa Walsingham, 1891

Species of plume moth

The brown leaffolder (Ochyrotica concursa) is a moth of the family Pterophoridae. It is known from Sri Lanka.

In the past it was also recorded from the Ryukyu Islands (Tokunoshima, Okinawa), as well as in Minamidaitōjima, Taiwan, China, the Philippines, India, the Moluccas and New Guinea, but research suggest these records are not related to this species.

The length of the forewings is 6–7 mm.

The larvae feed on Ipomoea batatas.
