= Gypsochares catharotes =

Scientific classification
- Domain: Eukaryota
- Kingdom: Animalia
- Phylum: Arthropoda
- Class: Insecta
- Order: Lepidoptera
- Family: Pterophoridae
- Genus: Gypsochares
- Species: G. catharotes

Binomial name
- Gypsochares catharotes (Meyrick, 1907)

Synonyms
- Pselnophorus catharotes Meyrick, 1907; Gysochares catharotes

Species of plume moth

Gypsochares catharotes is a moth of the family Pterophoridae that is known from South Africa, India (Khasi Hills, Cherrapunji, Sikkim, Kumaon, Bhim Tal and Muktesar) and possibly Pakistan.

The wingspan is 13–14 millimetres (0.51–0.55 in).
