= Hellinsia triadias =

Scientific classification
- Kingdom: Animalia
- Phylum: Arthropoda
- Class: Insecta
- Order: Lepidoptera
- Family: Pterophoridae
- Genus: Hellinsia
- Species: H. triadias

Binomial name
- Hellinsia triadias (Meyrick, 1908)

Synonyms
- Pterophorus triadias Meyrick, 1908

Species of moth

Hellinsia triadias is a moth of the family Pterophoridae that is endemic to India.
