= Gypsochares kukti =

Scientific classification
- Domain: Eukaryota
- Kingdom: Animalia
- Phylum: Arthropoda
- Class: Insecta
- Order: Lepidoptera
- Family: Pterophoridae
- Genus: Gypsochares
- Species: G. kukti

Binomial name
- Gypsochares kukti Arenberger, 1989

Species of plume moth

Gypsochares kukti is a moth of the family Pterophoridae that is found in India (Himalayas).

The wingspan is about 20 millimetres (0.79 in). The ground colour of all wings is coffee brown.
