= Xyroptila oenophanes =

Scientific classification
- Kingdom: Animalia
- Phylum: Arthropoda
- Class: Insecta
- Order: Lepidoptera
- Family: Pterophoridae
- Genus: Xyroptila
- Species: X. oenophanes

Binomial name
- Xyroptila oenophanes Meyrick, 1908

Synonyms
- Pseudoxyroptila tectonica Meyrick, 1914; Xyroptila tectonica

Species of plume moth

Xyroptila oenophanes is a moth of the family Pterophoridae. It is found in India and Taiwan.
