= Trichoptilus pelias =

Scientific classification
- Kingdom: Animalia
- Phylum: Arthropoda
- Class: Insecta
- Order: Lepidoptera
- Family: Pterophoridae
- Genus: Trichoptilus
- Species: T. pelias

Binomial name
- Trichoptilus pelias Meyrick, 1908

Species of plume moth

Trichoptilus pelias is a moth of the family Pterophoridae that is found in India.
