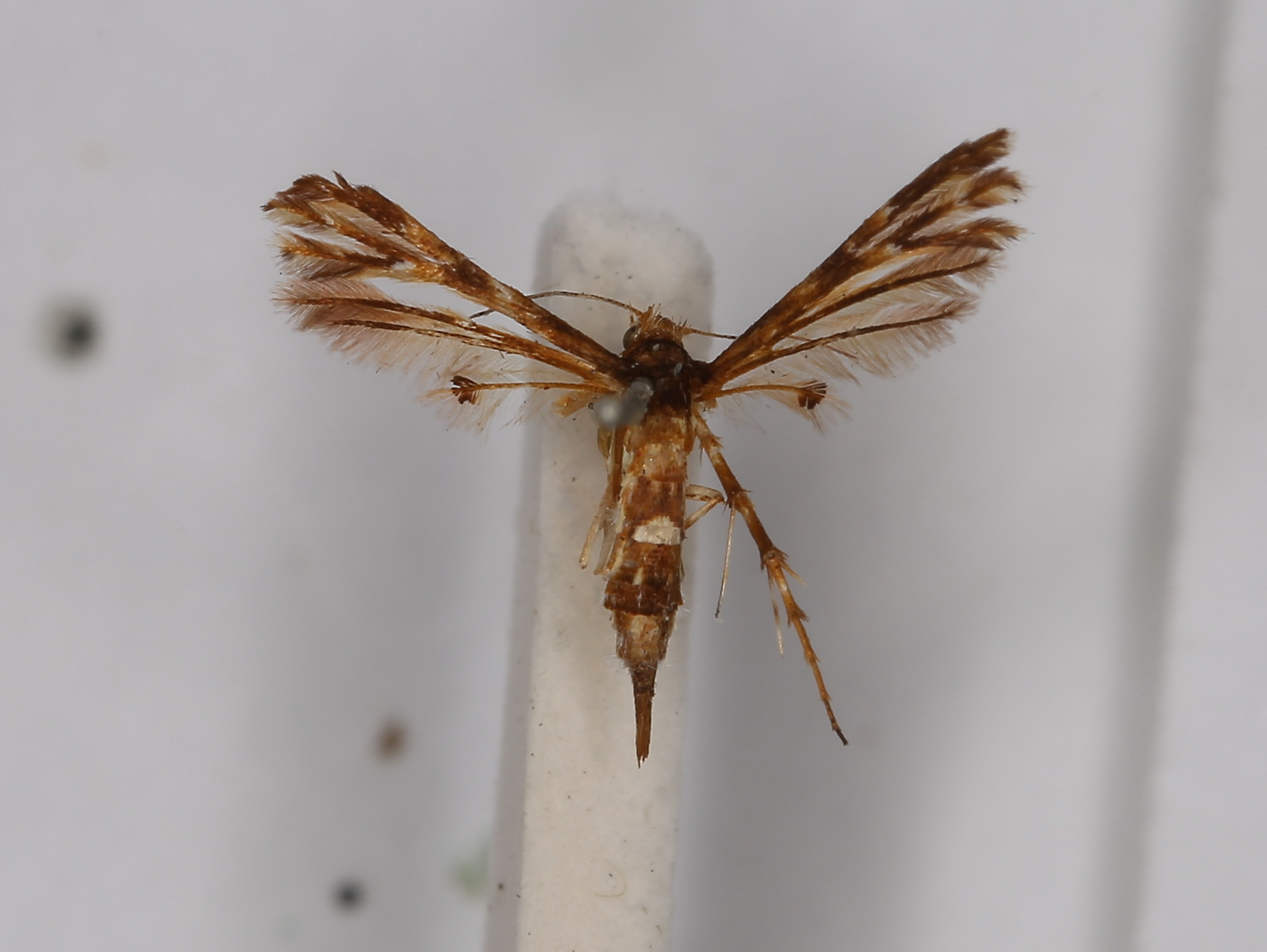
- Deuterocopus planeta Meyrick, 1908, syntype, Natural History Museum specimen NHMUK 010919176

Scientific classification
- Kingdom: Animalia
- Phylum: Arthropoda
- Class: Insecta
- Order: Lepidoptera
- Family: Pterophoridae
- Genus: Deuterocopus
- Species: D. planeta

Binomial name
- Deuterocopus planeta Meyrick, 1908

Synonyms
- Deuterocopus torridus Meyrick, 1913

= Deuterocopus planeta =

Species of plume moth

Deuterocopus planeta is a moth of the family Pterophoridae. It is found from India, through south-east Asia and the Indonesian Archipelago.

The wingspan is 10–11 mm.

The larvae have been recorded feeding on the flowers of Leea sambucina.
