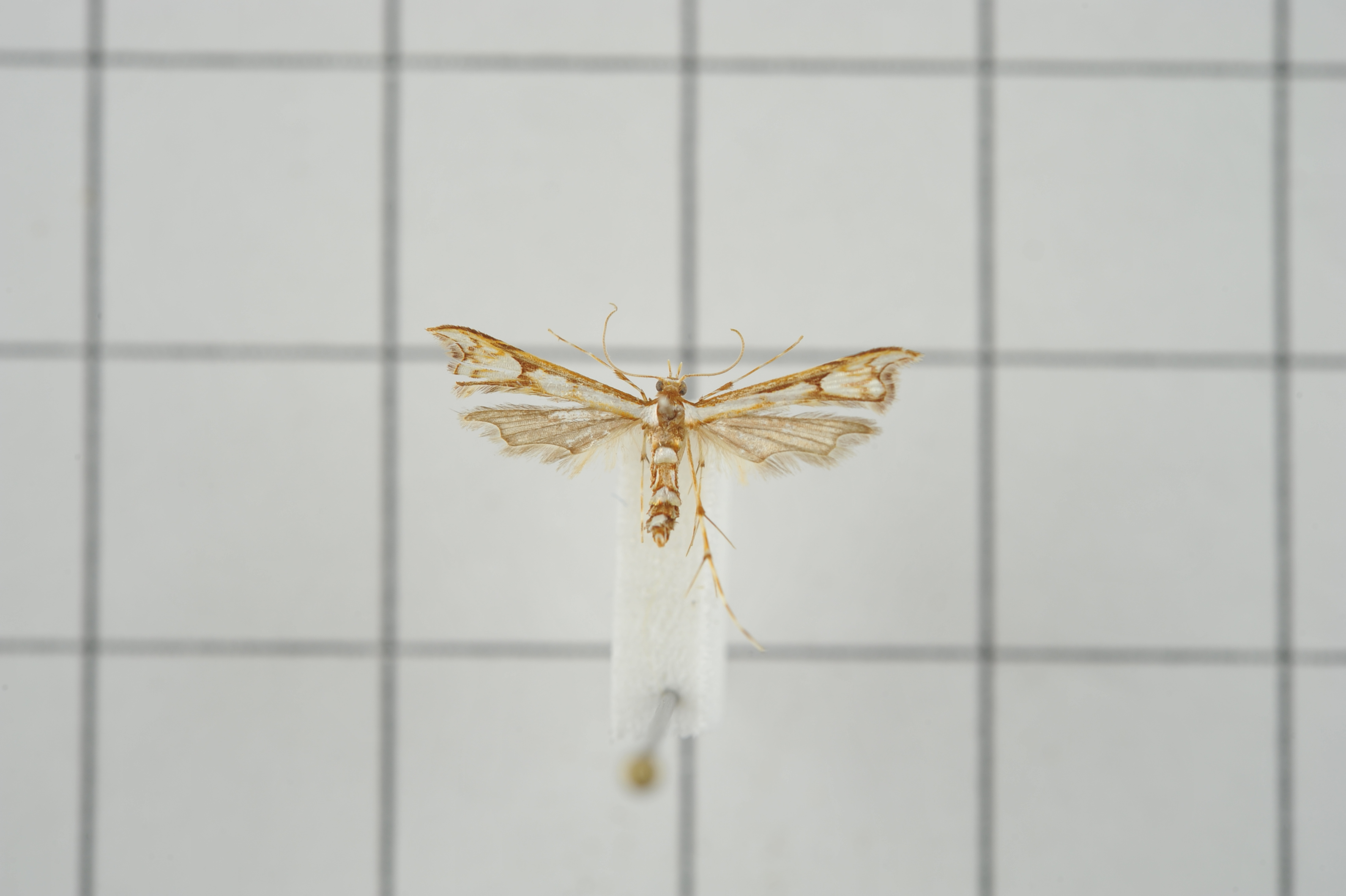

Scientific classification
- Domain: Eukaryota
- Kingdom: Animalia
- Phylum: Arthropoda
- Class: Insecta
- Order: Lepidoptera
- Family: Pterophoridae
- Genus: Ochyrotica
- Species: O. connexiva

Binomial name
- Ochyrotica connexiva (Walsingham, 1891)

Synonyms
- Steganodactyla detruncatum Walsingham, 1891

= Ochyrotica connexiva =

Species of plume moth

Ochyrotica connexiva is a moth of the family Pterophoridae. It is found in Burma.

The wingspan is about 17 mm (0.67 in). The forewings are snow-white with a golden brown pattern.
