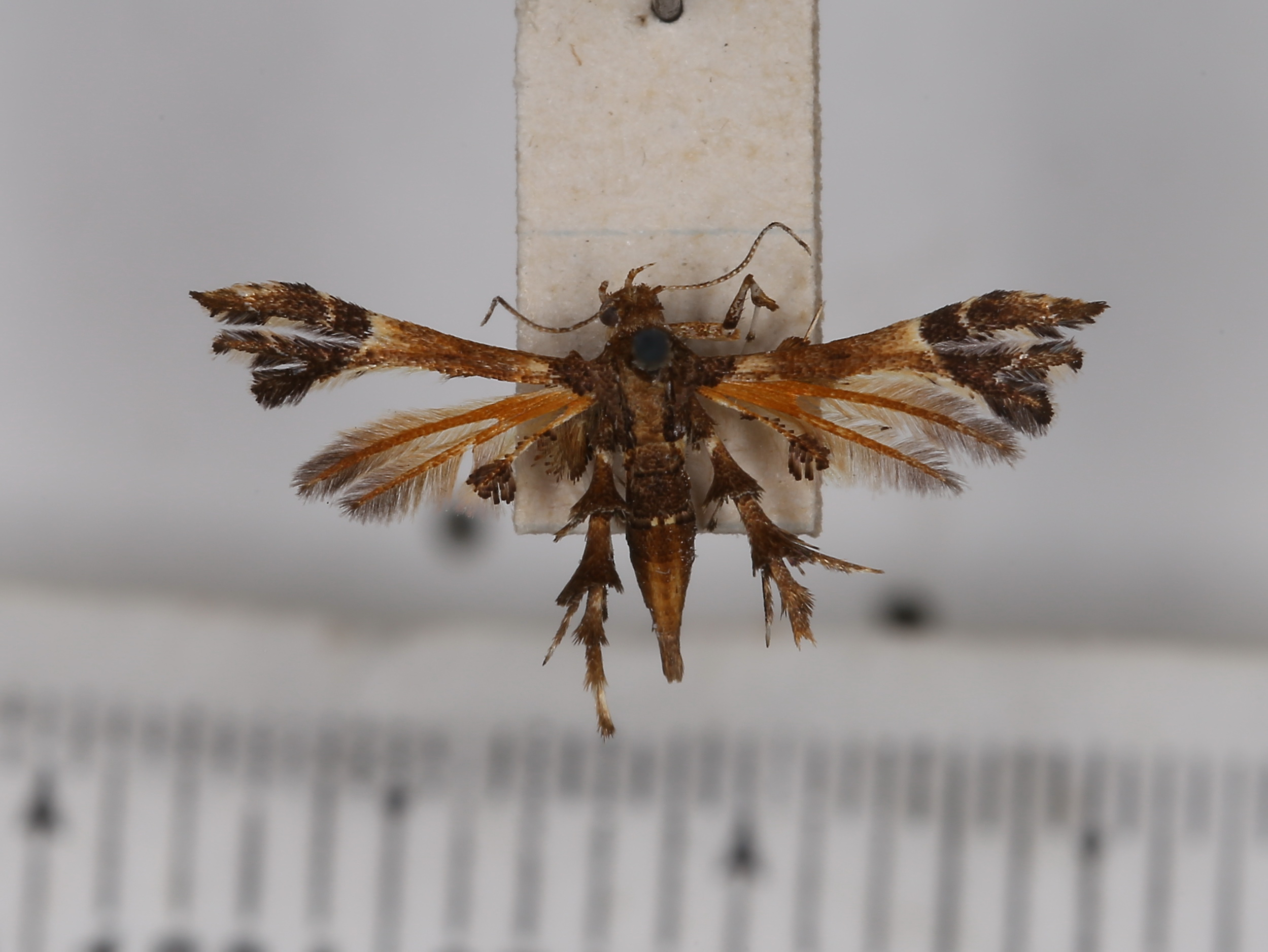
- Natural History Museum specimen NHMUK 010919171

Scientific classification
- Domain: Eukaryota
- Kingdom: Animalia
- Phylum: Arthropoda
- Class: Insecta
- Order: Lepidoptera
- Family: Pterophoridae
- Genus: Deuterocopus
- Species: D. atrapex

Binomial name
- Deuterocopus atrapex T. B. Fletcher, 1909

Synonyms
- Deuterocopus fervens Meyrick, 1913

= Deuterocopus atrapex =

Species of plume moth

Deuterocopus atrapex is a moth of the family Pterophoridae described by Thomas Bainbrigge Fletcher in 1909. It has been recorded from Sri Lanka, Assam, Selangor, the Tenasserim Hills, south-eastern Borneo, Ternate, Ambon Island, Batian, southern Sulawesi, the Sangihe Islands, Halmahera, Neu Pommern, northern New Guinea, the Kei Islands, the D'Entrecasteaux Islands and Queensland.

== Original description ==
(wingspan male 13 mm) Palpi erect, smoothly-scaled, sickle-shaped, reaching vertex; third joint about one-half length of second, acuminate: whitish-ochreous, banded with ochreous-brown at joints. Head dark-brown sprinkled with dark-ochreous; a few anteriorly-erected scales on crown. Haustellum well developed. Antennae ferruginous-brown with a series of whitish dots above. Thorax golden-ferruginous, wholly suffused with dark-brown; pectus whitish. Abdomen rather stout, golden-ferruginous lightly suffused with dark-brown, across third segment a broad transverse dark-brown bar ill-defined posteriorly and tending to be continued as a short subdorsal stripe on either side; anal tuft short, concolorous with abdomen; venter whitish with a ferruginous transverse bar across fourth segment. Foreleg: femur ferruginous; tibia short, ferruginous, banded with whitish at base and provided apically with a large flattened brush-like tuft of dark-ferruginous scales; tarsi-whitish, dark-ferruginous at apex of first joint and beyond 1/2 of third joint. Midleg ferruginous: tibia with a large apical tuft of dark-ferruginous scales below which projects a pair of moderate spurs; tarsi lined with whitish above, first tarsal joint incrassated apically with short divergent posteriorly-projecting spinous hairs. Hindleg bright golden-ferruginous minutely irrorated with blackish: tibia large and stout with whorls of scales at 1/3, 2/3 and apex, the second and third whorls subequal, much larger than first, and each emitting a pair of long whitish slightly curved spurs which are banded with blackish-ferruginous at their bases and before their apices and which are roughly haired all along their posterior edges; the inner proximal spur is slightly longer than the outer, those of the distal pair are equal and are each rather shorter than the outer proximal spur; tarsal joints with very small apical whorls of spinous hairs, these whorls decreasing in size on successive tarsal joints, second joint moderately, third and fourth heavily, suffused with blackish. Forewing rather short, cleft from 3/5, second segment again cleft from about 1/2 of its length, segments sublinear without any appreciable angles: bright golden-ochreous, suffused with ferruginous especially evident between 1/5 and 2/5: extreme base of wing blackish, a whitish subcostal patch at 3/5; first segment wholly black, cut at 1/4 of its length by a narrow transverse ferruginous fascia most evident costad; second segment sharply cut at base by a line extending obliquely outwards from base of cleft to dorsum, the whole area outside of this line (and including both subsegments) wholly black. Cilia golden-ochreous on costa, ferruginous opposite ferruginous suffusion and with traces of three pale-ferruginous patches (sometimes well marked) between 4/5 and apex; at apex black; on hinder-margin of first segment blackish with a few heavy black scales towards base, at 1/2 a moderate patch of pale-ochreous and a narrow patch of pale-ochreous just before termen, where the cilia are black at their base and pale-ochreous apically; on fore-margin of second segment blackish; on termen of first subsegment pale-ochreous, blackish at their base around apex of subsegment; within second cleft blackish; at tornus pale-ochreous; blackish at their base; on dorsum ochreous-yellow with a small blackish scale-tuft at 2/3 (beneath base of first cleft), blackish beyond 4/5. Hindwing cleft from about 2/5 and 1/6, segment linear: golden-ferruginons irrorated with blackish. Cilia pale-ferruginous, darker around apices of segments and at 1/2 on hinder-margin of second segment, third segment with a large terminal patch of blackish scales occupying exterior fourth of both margins, a small black scale-tooth on dorsum at 1/2, and a few scattered blackish scales on anterior margin. TYPE ♂, No. 6650, in Bainbrigge Fletcher Coll.: CEYLON, Central Province, Kandy (1600 feet), May 1907 (E. Ernest Green).

— Original re-description by T. B. Fletcher
