= Cosmoclostis auxileuca =

Scientific classification
- Kingdom: Animalia
- Phylum: Arthropoda
- Class: Insecta
- Order: Lepidoptera
- Family: Pterophoridae
- Genus: Cosmoclostis
- Species: C. auxileuca

Binomial name
- Cosmoclostis auxileuca (Meyrick, 1908)

Synonyms
- Diacrotricha auxileuca Meyrick, 1908

Species of plume moth

Cosmoclostis auxileuca is a moth of the family Pterophoridae. It is found in Assam, India.
