= Alyce clover =

Alyce clover is a common name for several plants in the genus Alysicarpus and may refer to:

- Alysicarpus ovalifolius
- Alysicarpus rugosus, native to Africa, Asia, and Australia
- Alysicarpus vaginalis, native to Africa and Asia
