= Hedysarum graminifolium =

Hedysarum graminifolium can refer to the following plant species:

- Hedysarum graminifolium Roxb. ex Wall., a synonym of Alysicarpus rugosus (Willd.) DC. subsp. rugosus
- Hedysarum graminifolium Russell ex Wall., a synonym of Alysicarpus bupleurifolius (L.) DC. var. bupleurifolius
