= Hedysarum gramineum =

Hedysarum gramineum can refer to the following plant species:

- Hedysarum gramineum Buch.-Ham. ex Wall., a synonym of Alysicarpus rugosus (Willd.) DC. subsp. rugosus
- Hedysarum gramineum Retz., a synonym of Alysicarpus bupleurifolius (L.) DC. var. bupleurifolius
