= Hedysarum glumaceum =

Hedysarum glumaceum can refer to the following plant species:

- Hedysarum glumaceum Roxb., a synonym of Alysicarpus rugosus (Willd.) DC. subsp. rugosus
- Hedysarum glumaceum Vahl, a synonym of Alysicarpus glumaceus (Vahl) DC.
