= Bruchidius mendosus =

Scientific classification
- Kingdom: Animalia
- Phylum: Arthropoda
- Class: Insecta
- Order: Coleoptera
- Suborder: Polyphaga
- Infraorder: Cucujiformia
- Family: Chrysomelidae
- Genus: Bruchidius
- Species: B. mendosus

Binomial name
- Bruchidius mendosus (Gyllenhal, 1839)

Synonyms
- Bruchus mendosus (Gyllenhal 1839); Bruchus minimus Motschoulsky, 1858; Bruchus decretus Walker, 1859; Bruchidius mendosus (Gyllenhal): Decelle, 1975; Bruchidius vulgaris Arora, 1977

Species of beetle

Bruchidius mendosus, is a species of leaf beetle found in India, Sri Lanka, Bhutan, Iran, Myanmar, Nepal, Thailand, Vietnam, and Yemen.

== Description ==
Body length is less than 1.5 mm.

It is a seed borer commonly found in Grona triflora seeds and probably in Alysicarpus monilifer.
