= Hedysarum rugosum =

Hedysarum rugosum can refer to the following plant species:

- Hedysarum rugosum Sieber ex DC., a synonym of Alysicarpus bupleurifolius (L.) DC. var. bupleurifolius
- Hedysarum rugosum Willd., a synonym of Alysicarpus rugosus (Willd.) DC.
