= Bruchidius anderssoni =

Scientific classification
- Kingdom: Animalia
- Phylum: Arthropoda
- Class: Insecta
- Order: Coleoptera
- Suborder: Polyphaga
- Infraorder: Cucujiformia
- Family: Chrysomelidae
- Genus: Bruchidius
- Species: B. anderssoni

Binomial name
- Bruchidius anderssoni Decelle, 1975

Species of beetle

Bruchidius anderssoni, is a species of leaf beetle found in India, Nepal, Sri Lanka, Thailand and Vietnam.

== Description ==
It is a smaller species with maximum body length of 1.2 to 1.3 mm.

It is a seed borer commonly found in Desmodium gangeticum seeds.
