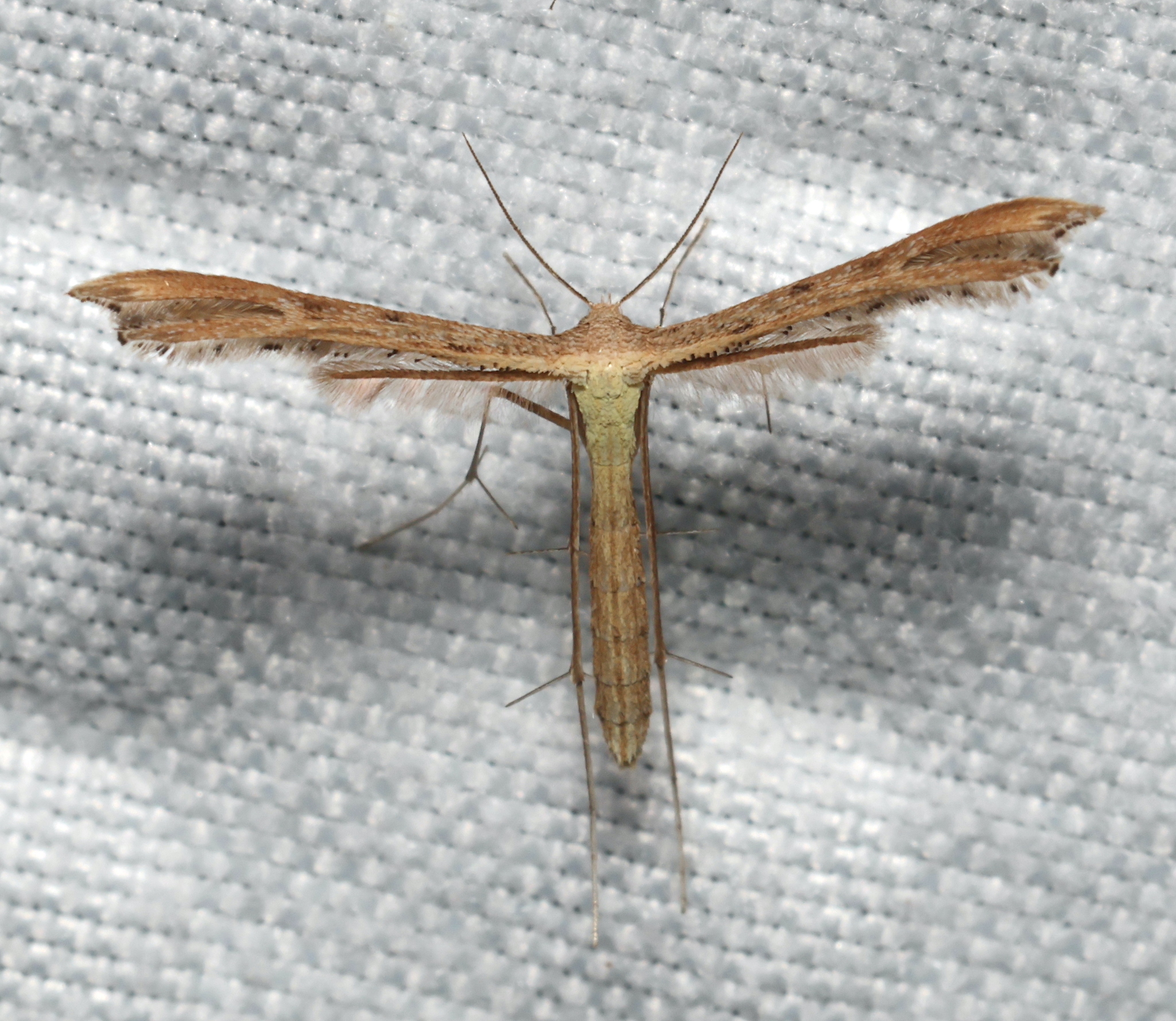

Scientific classification
- Kingdom: Animalia
- Phylum: Arthropoda
- Class: Insecta
- Order: Lepidoptera
- Family: Pterophoridae
- Genus: Exelastis
- Species: E. pumilio

Binomial name
- Exelastis pumilio (Zeller, 1873)

Synonyms
- Mimeseoptilus pumilio Zeller, 1873; Marasmarcha liophanes Meyrick, 1886; Mimaesoptilus gilvidorsis Hedemann, 1896 (not Zeller, 1877); Exelastis pumilio (Zeller, 1873); Marasmarcha tenax Meyrick, 1913; Exelastis tenax (Meyrick, 1913); Leioptilus griseodactylus Pagenstecher, 1900; Marasmarcha griseodactylus; Hellinsia griseodactylus

= Exelastis pumilio =

Species of plume moth

Exelastis pumilio is a moth of the family Pterophoridae. It has worldwide tropical distribution, including Argentina, Brazil, Colombia, Costa Rica, Cuba, Ecuador, Guadeloupe, Jamaica, Mexico, Puerto Rico, Suriname, Japan, Micronesia, South Africa the Virgin Islands as well as Queensland and New Guinea.

The wingspan is 12–15 mm. Adults are on wing in March, April and June.

== Foodplants ==
Larvae have been recorded feeding on Desmodium incanum, Alysicarpus vaginalis and Oxalis sp. In India it was recorded feeding on Boerhaavia repens from India and Sri Lanka (Fletcher 1909, 1921) and Boerhaavia diffusa from Hawaii (Zimmerman 1958). In Guam some specimens were obtained from Boerhaavia sp.

== Taxonomy ==
The genus Hepalastis is often treated as a synonym of Exelastis.
