= Gnatholea simplex =

Scientific classification
- Kingdom: Animalia
- Phylum: Arthropoda
- Class: Insecta
- Order: Coleoptera
- Suborder: Polyphaga
- Infraorder: Cucujiformia
- Family: Cerambycidae
- Genus: Gnatholea
- Species: G. simplex

Binomial name
- Gnatholea simplex Gahan, 1890

Species of beetle

Gnatholea simplex is a species of longhorn beetle native to India, Sri Lanka, Taiwan and Myanmar.

It is a sapwood borer which shows annual lifecycle. It can be prolonged up to three years by dry conditions. Adults are usually visible during May to August. Host plants of the larva include Hardwickia binata, Albizia odoratissima, Millettia pinnata, Pongamia glabra, Shorea robusta.
