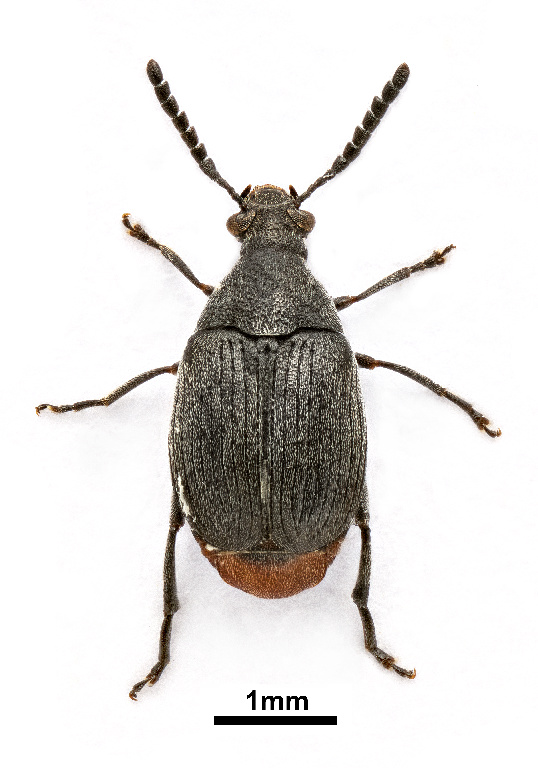

Scientific classification
- Kingdom: Animalia
- Phylum: Arthropoda
- Class: Insecta
- Order: Coleoptera
- Suborder: Polyphaga
- Infraorder: Cucujiformia
- Family: Chrysomelidae
- Genus: Bruchidius
- Species: B. siliquastri

Binomial name
- Bruchidius siliquastri Delobel, 2007

= Bruchidius siliquastri =

Species of beetle

Bruchidius siliquastri is a species of bean weevil. It was first found in pods of Cercis siliquastrum in China, and has thence been found in several continents. Its length ranges from 2.8 to 3.7 millimetres (0.11 to 0.15 in). Its body is short and ovate, with a black integument. The apex of its femora and the ventral part of its hind tarsi are reddish. Its vestiture is made of thin and short setae; dorsally setae are a whitish colour, denser on the scutellum. Its pygidium is also covered with setae. Its name is derived from its host plant.

== Description ==
=== Male ===
The head of the male is short, with bulging eyes. Its frons lacks a carina. Its pronotum is very convex, wider at the base, while the elytra are short; its third stria possesses a small tooth. The hind femora are incrassate, with a carinate mesoventral margin. The hind tibiae are apically widened, with both dorsomesal and ventral carinae that are strong. Its first tarsomere does not have an apical denticle ventrally.

On its abdomen, ventrite 5 is emarginate, as long as the 4th sternite. Its first ventrite has a patch of short erect setae basally, which are somewhat scaly. Its pygidium is subcircular, with its apex turned under. The median lobe of its genitalia has a total length of 0.27 mm; its ventral valve is subtriangular and rather sclerotised, bearing sensilla and a row of 10-13 setae on each side. Its internal sac possesses 2 or 3 pointed denticles. The apex of its parameres contain abundant setae.

=== Female ===
The female is similar to the male, but its last abdominal ventrite is not emarginate and is longer than its 4th; the pygidium is narrower than the male's, bearing a pair of foveae, which are 0.3–0.4 mm long and 0.1 mm wide. Its spermatheca is narrow and curved, with an elongated apical diverticulum. The opening of its spermathecal gland duct is basal, contiguous with its opening. Its vagina shows a large sclerite on its dorsal side, slightly behind the spermathecal duct opening. Its bursa copulatrix does not exhibit spines.

== Distribution ==
Firstly described from Southern France, it is also known in China (from where the species probably originates) and has since been reported on several occasions in Europe and Asia.
