= Exelastis viettei =

Scientific classification
- Kingdom: Animalia
- Phylum: Arthropoda
- Clade: Pancrustacea
- Class: Insecta
- Order: Lepidoptera
- Family: Pterophoridae
- Genus: Exelastis
- Species: E. viettei

Binomial name
- Exelastis viettei (Gibeaux, 1994)

Synonyms
- Cordivalva viettei Gibeaux, 1994

Species of plume moth

Exelastis viettei is a moth of the family Pterophoridae. It is known from the Comoros.
