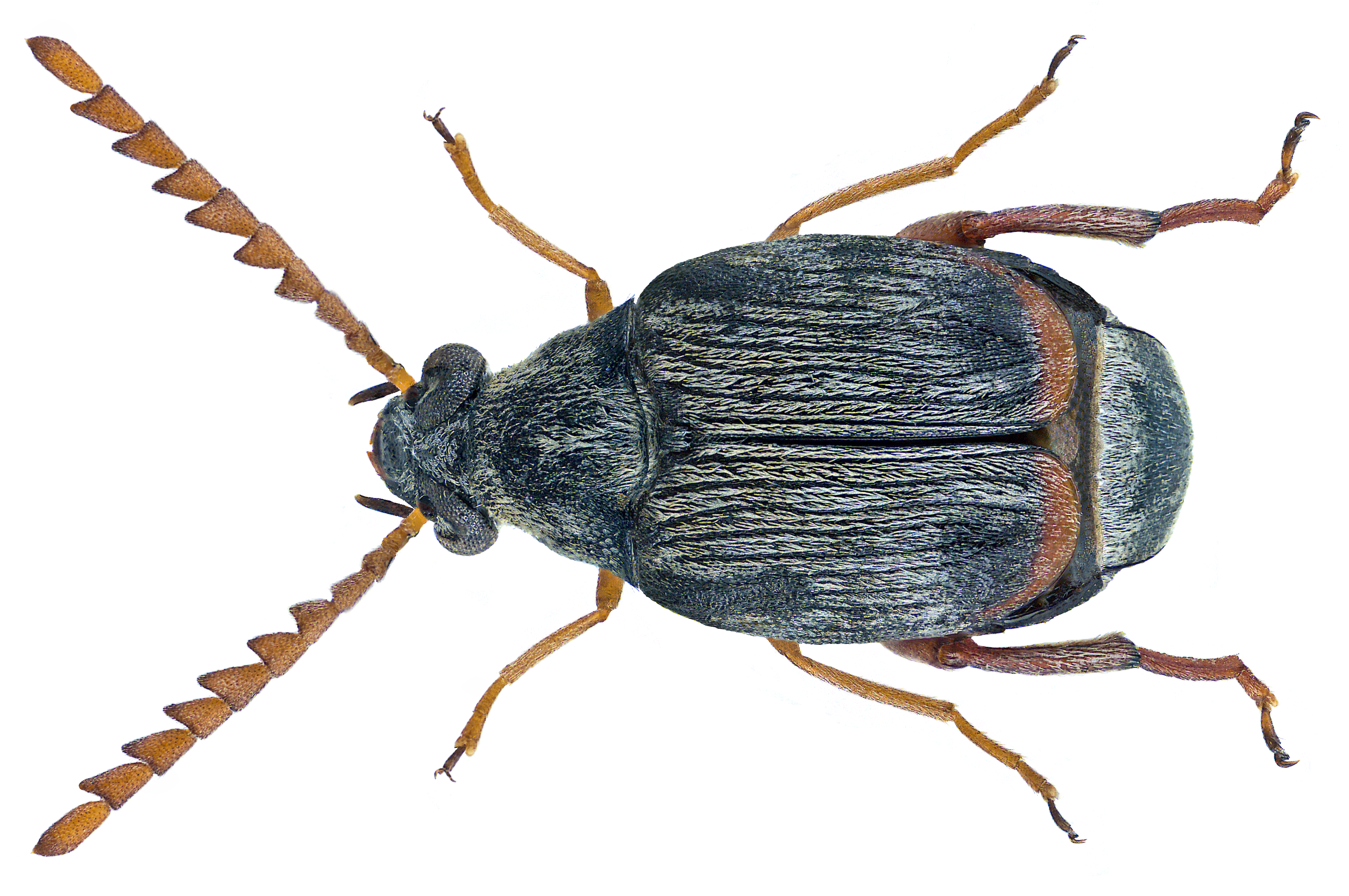

Scientific classification
- Kingdom: Animalia
- Phylum: Arthropoda
- Class: Insecta
- Order: Coleoptera
- Suborder: Polyphaga
- Infraorder: Cucujiformia
- Family: Chrysomelidae
- Genus: Bruchidius
- Species: B. nalandus

Binomial name
- Bruchidius nalandus (Pic, 1927)

= Bruchidius nalandus =

Species of beetle

Bruchidius nalandus, is a species of leaf beetle found in Congo, India, Indonesia, Iran, Kenya, South Africa, Sri Lanka, United Arab Emirates, Vietnam and Socotra Island.

== Description ==
The proximal sclerite of the saccus is triangular.

It is a seed borer commonly found in seeds of Crotalaria pallida, Phyllodium pulchellum, Tephrosia candida, Tephrosia apollinea and Tephrosia purpurea.
