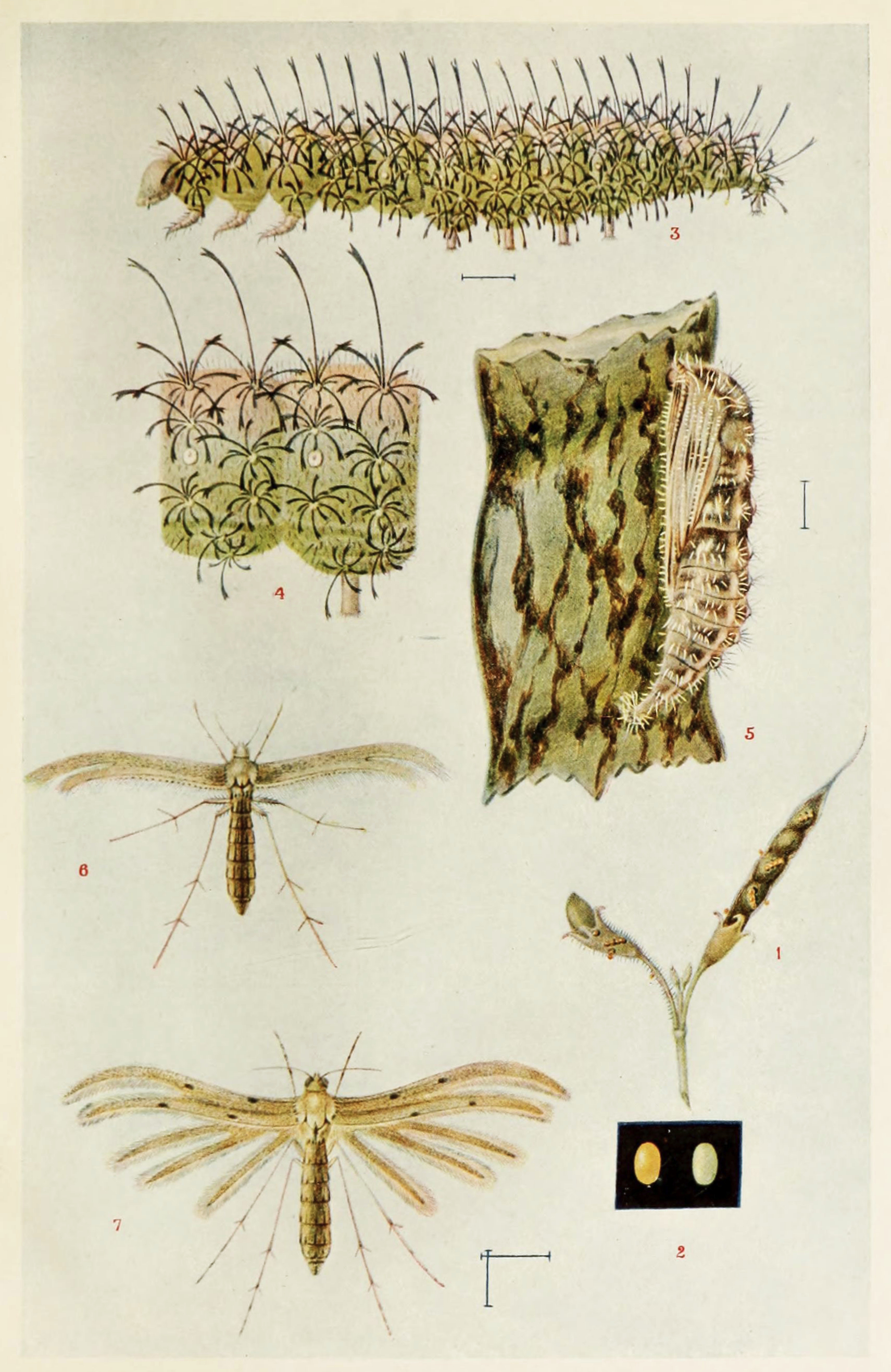
- Image by Harold Maxwell-Lefroy

Scientific classification
- Domain: Eukaryota
- Kingdom: Animalia
- Phylum: Arthropoda
- Class: Insecta
- Order: Lepidoptera
- Family: Pterophoridae
- Genus: Exelastis
- Species: E. atomosa

Binomial name
- Exelastis atomosa (Walsingham, 1885)

Synonyms
- Marasmarcha atomosa Walsingham, 1885

= Exelastis atomosa =

Species of plume moth

Exelastis atomosa is a moth of the family Pterophoridae. It is known from Cape Verde, Ethiopia, Kenya, Madagascar, South Africa, Eswatini, Tanzania, India, Nepal and Iran.

Adult are small with yellowish brown wings. The forewings are cut into two plumes and hind wings into three.

The larvae are a serious pest of pigeon pea. They damage seeds as well as cause flowers, buds and pods to drop. It also enters into the pod and feeds on developing grains. They are greenish-brown and fringed with short hairs and spines.
