= Exelastis vuattouxi =

Scientific classification
- Kingdom: Animalia
- Phylum: Arthropoda
- Clade: Pancrustacea
- Class: Insecta
- Order: Lepidoptera
- Family: Pterophoridae
- Genus: Exelastis
- Species: E. vuattouxi

Binomial name
- Exelastis vuattouxi Bigot, 1970

Species of plume moth

Exelastis vuattouxi is a moth of the family Pterophoridae. It is found in Côte d'Ivoire and Nigeria.
