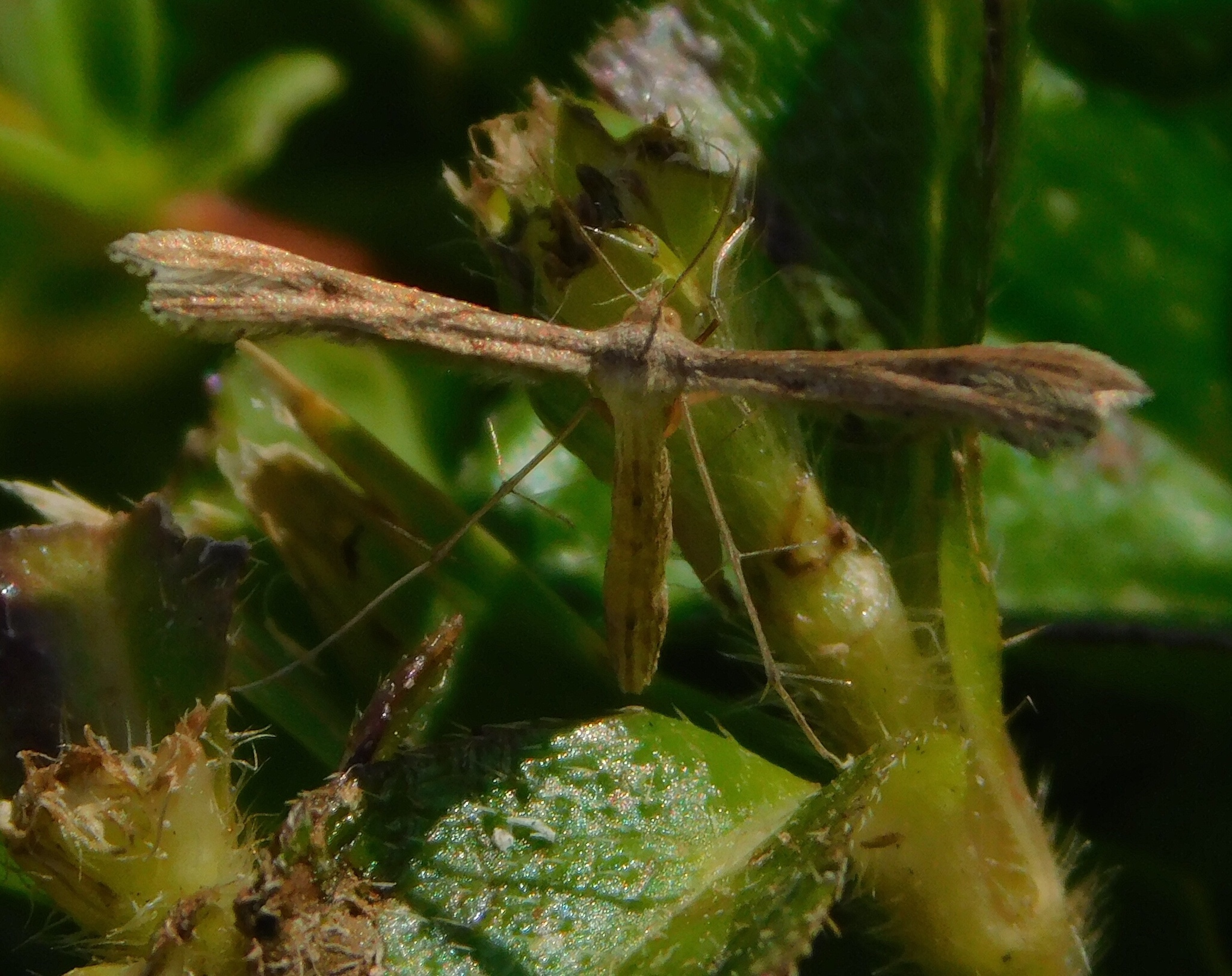
- Exelastis pumilio, Florida

Scientific classification
- Kingdom: Animalia
- Phylum: Arthropoda
- Class: Insecta
- Order: Lepidoptera
- Family: Pterophoridae
- Tribe: Marasmarchini
- Genus: Exelastis; Meyrick, 1908

Synonyms
- Karachia Amsel, 1968; Marasmarcha auct., not Meyrick, 1886; Hepalastis Gibeaux, 1994; Cordivalva Gibeaux, 1994

= Exelastis =

Plume moth genus

Exelastis is a genus of moths in the family Pterophoridae.

== Species ==
As of version 1.1.23.125, the Catalogue of the Pterophoroidea of the World lists the following 19 species for genus Exelastis:

- Exelastis atomosa (Walsingham, 1885)
- Exelastis boireaui Bigot, 1992
- Exelastis crepuscularis Meyrick, 1909
- Exelastis crudipennis (Meyrick, 1932)
- Exelastis dowi Matthews & Landry, 2008
- Exelastis ebalensis (Rebel, 1907)
- Exelastis hulstaerti Gielis, 2011
- Exelastis luqueti Gibeaux, 1994
- Exelastis montischristi (Walsingham, 1897)
- Exelastis pavidus (Meyrick, 1908)
- Exelastis phlyctaenias (Meyrick, 1911)
- Exelastis pilum Gielis, 2009
- Exelastis pumilio (Zeller, 1873)
- Exelastis rhynchosiae (Dyar, 1898)
- Exelastis robinsoni Gibeaux, 1994
- Exelastis sarcochroa (Meyrick, 1932)
- Exelastis tenax (Meyrick, 1913)
- Exelastis viettei Gibeaux, 1994
- Exelastis vuattouxi Bigot, 1970

== Former species ==
- Exelastis bergeri Bigot, 1969
