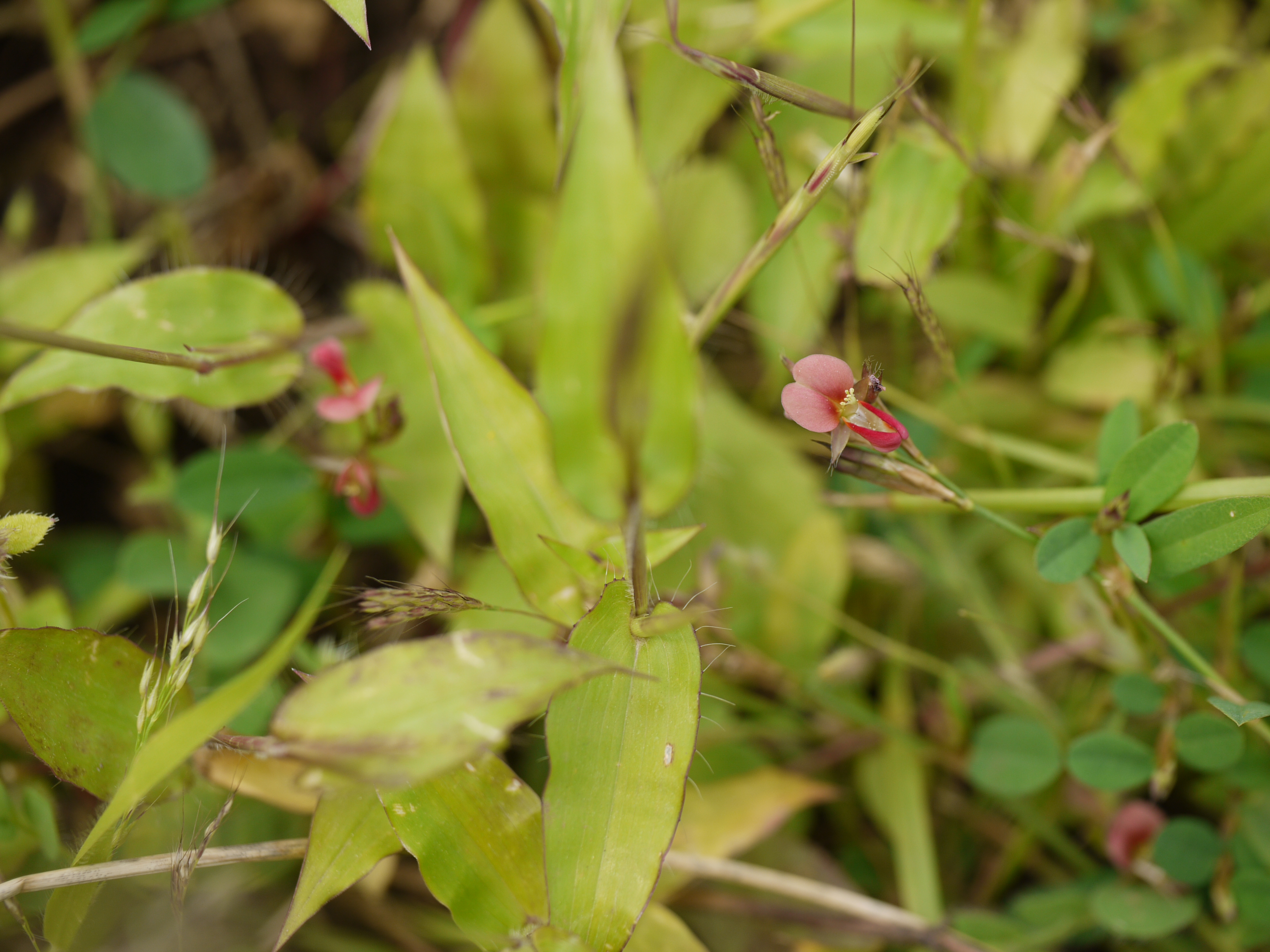

Conservation status
- Least Concern (IUCN 3.1)

Scientific classification
- Kingdom: Plantae
- Clade: Tracheophytes
- Clade: Angiosperms
- Clade: Eudicots
- Clade: Rosids
- Order: Fabales
- Family: Fabaceae
- Subfamily: Faboideae
- Genus: Alysicarpus
- Species: A. naikianus

Binomial name
- Alysicarpus naikianus Pokle

= Alysicarpus naikianus =

Species of plant

Alysicarpus naikianus is a herb in the legume family Fabaceae, native to India.

== Distribution and habitat ==
Alysicarpus naikianus is native to Gujarat, Maharashtra, Goa, Karnataka and Kerala. Its habitat is in shrubland, grassland and along roadsides, from sea level to 800 metres (2,600 ft) altitude.
