= Exelastis crudipennis =

Scientific classification
- Kingdom: Animalia
- Phylum: Arthropoda
- Class: Insecta
- Order: Lepidoptera
- Family: Pterophoridae
- Genus: Exelastis
- Species: E. crudipennis

Binomial name
- Exelastis crudipennis (Meyrick, 1932)

Synonyms
- Marasmarcha crudipennis Meyrick, 1932; Exelastis bergeri Bigot, 1969

Species of plume moth

Exelastis crudipennis is a moth of the family Pterophoridae. It is known from the Congo, Malawi and Uganda.
