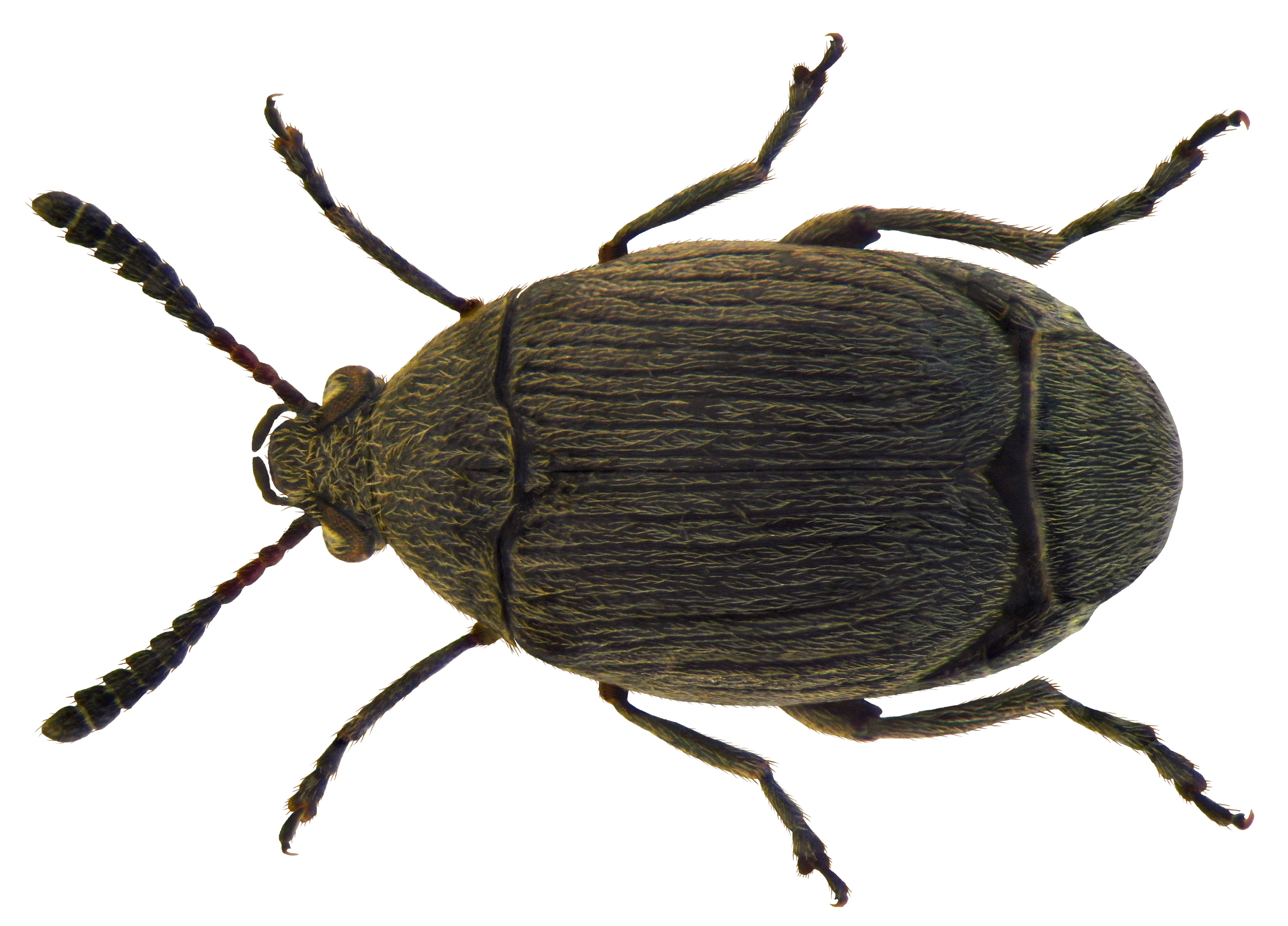

Scientific classification
- Kingdom: Animalia
- Phylum: Arthropoda
- Class: Insecta
- Order: Coleoptera
- Suborder: Polyphaga
- Infraorder: Cucujiformia
- Family: Chrysomelidae
- Genus: Bruchidius
- Species: B. villosus

Binomial name
- Bruchidius villosus (Fabricius, 1792)

= Bruchidius villosus =

Species of beetle

Bruchidius villosus is a species of bean weevil known by the common names broom seed beetle and Scotch broom bruchid. This beetle is used as an agent of biological pest control against the noxious weed known as Scotch broom (Cytisus scoparius).

This is a dark gray weevil about two millimeters long. The female lays about ten eggs on the seed pod of the plant. The larva hatches from the egg at the point it is attached to the pod and burrows into the pod, where it develops and feeds on the seeds. The larva is one to two millimeters long and gelatinous white. It pupates in the seed coat. When the seed pod ripens and splits open, adult weevils emerge.

This beetle is native to Europe. It was introduced to the United States by accident but was found to drastically reduce seed production in Scotch broom, its host plant. It became one of the newest insects to be deliberately released for the control of the plant in the 1990s. Its viability as a biocontrol agent is under study. It is used less often in New Zealand because it was found to attack plants other than its target when introduced there.
