= Exelastis phlyctaenias =

Scientific classification
- Kingdom: Animalia
- Phylum: Arthropoda
- Class: Insecta
- Order: Lepidoptera
- Family: Pterophoridae
- Genus: Exelastis
- Species: E. phlyctaenias

Binomial name
- Exelastis phlyctaenias (Meyrick, 1911)

Synonyms
- Marasmarcha phlyctaenias Meyrick, 1911

Species of plume moth

Exelastis phlyctaenias is a moth of the family Pterophoridae. It is known from the Virgin Islands, the islands of Luzon and Palawan in the Philippines, Sri Lanka, Tanzania, Kenya and India (Coorg), Burundi, Comoros, Congo, Ivory Coast, Ethiopia, La Réunion, Mauritius, Madagascar, Malawi and South Africa.

The wingspan is 15–16 mm. Adults are on wing in October on the Virgin Islands.

Larvae have been recorded on Anacardium occidentale (Cashew tree) (Anacardiaceae) and Cajanus indicus (Fabaceae).
