= Exelastis pavidus =

Scientific classification
- Domain: Eukaryota
- Kingdom: Animalia
- Phylum: Arthropoda
- Class: Insecta
- Order: Lepidoptera
- Family: Pterophoridae
- Genus: Exelastis
- Species: E. pavidus

Binomial name
- Exelastis pavidus (Meyrick, 1908)

Synonyms
- Pterophorus pavidus Meyrick, 1908

Species of plume moth

Exelastis pavidus is a moth of the family Pterophoridae. It is known from South Africa.

The species was described by Edward Meyrick in 1908. Its type locality is Polokwane, South Africa.

It has been regarded as a junior synonym of Marasmarcha bonaespei.

== Distribution ==
In addition to South Africa, this species has also been found in the Budongo Forest and Minziro Forest of Uganda.
