= Exelastis ebalensis =

Scientific classification
- Domain: Eukaryota
- Kingdom: Animalia
- Phylum: Arthropoda
- Class: Insecta
- Order: Lepidoptera
- Family: Pterophoridae
- Genus: Exelastis
- Species: E. ebalensis

Binomial name
- Exelastis ebalensis (Rebel, 1907)

Synonyms
- Alucita ebalensis Rebel, 1907; Exelastis caroli Gielis, 2008; Pterophorus ashanti Arenberger, 1995; Karachia xylochromella Amsel, 1968

Species of plume moth

Exelastis ebalensis is a moth belonging to the Pterophoridae family. It has been recorded from Kenya, (Note: As Exelastis caroli) Ghana, India, Nepal, Pakistan, Oman and Yemen.

== Description ==
Cees Gielis described Exelastis caroli, which has since been synonymized to Exelastis ebalensis. It has been described to have a wingspan of 13 mm, pale-ochreous white forewings with some darker scales and pale grey fringes, pale ochreous-white hindwings and fringes.
