= Exelastis pilum =

Scientific classification
- Kingdom: Animalia
- Phylum: Arthropoda
- Class: Insecta
- Order: Lepidoptera
- Family: Pterophoridae
- Genus: Exelastis
- Species: E. pilum

Binomial name
- Exelastis pilum Gielis, 2009

Species of plume moth

Exelastis pilum is a moth of the family Pterophoridae. It is found in the Democratic Republic of the Congo.
