= Exelastis robinsoni =

Scientific classification
- Kingdom: Animalia
- Phylum: Arthropoda
- Clade: Pancrustacea
- Class: Insecta
- Order: Lepidoptera
- Family: Pterophoridae
- Genus: Exelastis
- Species: E. robinsoni

Binomial name
- Exelastis robinsoni Gibeaux, 1994

Species of plume moth

Exelastis robinsoni is a moth of the family Pterophoridae. It is known from the Comoros.
