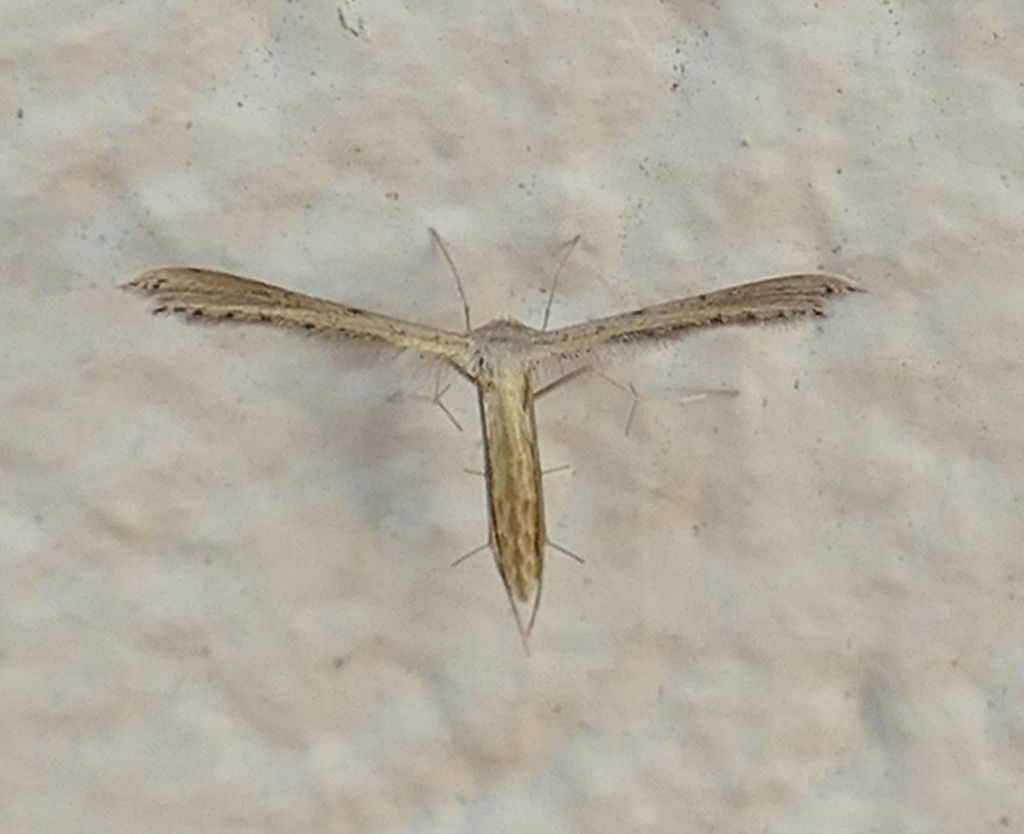

Scientific classification
- Kingdom: Animalia
- Phylum: Arthropoda
- Class: Insecta
- Order: Lepidoptera
- Family: Pterophoridae
- Genus: Exelastis
- Species: E. montischristi

Binomial name
- Exelastis montischristi (Walsingham, 1897)

Synonyms
- Pterophorus montischristi Walsingham, 1897; Pterophorus cervinicolor Barnes & McDunnough, 1913

= Exelastis montischristi =

Species of plume moth

Exelastis montischristi is a species of moth in the genus Exelastis known from Hispaniola, Ecuador, Grenada, Jamaica, Martinique, the Virgin Islands, Florida and Texas. It has also been recorded from Tanzania.

Adults take flight in January, July and August, and have a wingspan of about 16 millimetres.

Its host plant is Rhynchosia minima.
