= Exelastis sarcochroa =

Scientific classification
- Kingdom: Animalia
- Phylum: Arthropoda
- Class: Insecta
- Order: Lepidoptera
- Family: Pterophoridae
- Genus: Exelastis
- Species: E. sarcochroa

Binomial name
- Exelastis sarcochroa (Meyrick, 1932)

Synonyms
- Marasmarcha sarcochroa Meyrick, 1932

Species of plume moth

Exelastis sarcochroa is a moth of the family Pterophoridae.
