= Exelastis crepuscularis =

Scientific classification
- Kingdom: Animalia
- Phylum: Arthropoda
- Class: Insecta
- Order: Lepidoptera
- Family: Pterophoridae
- Genus: Exelastis
- Species: E. crepuscularis

Binomial name
- Exelastis crepuscularis (Meyrick, 1909)

Synonyms
- Marasmarcha crepuscularis Meyrick, 1909

Species of plume moth

Exelastis crepuscularis is a moth of the family Pterophoridae. It is known from South Africa and São Tomé and Principe.

The larvae feed on Alysicarpus vaginalis.
