= Bruchidius cisti =

Scientific classification
- Kingdom: Animalia
- Phylum: Arthropoda
- Class: Insecta
- Order: Coleoptera
- Suborder: Polyphaga
- Infraorder: Cucujiformia
- Family: Chrysomelidae
- Genus: Bruchidius
- Species: B. cisti

Binomial name
- Bruchidius cisti (Fabricius, 1775)

Species of beetle

Bruchidius cisti is a species of leaf beetle in the family Chrysomelidae. It is found in Europe and Northern Asia (excluding China) and North America.
