= Bruchidius brincki =

Scientific classification
- Kingdom: Animalia
- Phylum: Arthropoda
- Class: Insecta
- Order: Coleoptera
- Suborder: Polyphaga
- Infraorder: Cucujiformia
- Family: Chrysomelidae
- Subfamily: Bruchinae
- Tribe: Bruchini
- Genus: Bruchidius
- Species: B. brincki

Binomial name
- Bruchidius brincki Decelle, 1975

Species of beetle

Bruchidius brincki, is a species of leaf beetle found in Sri Lanka and Vietnam.

It is a seed borer commonly found in Desmodium heterocarpon seeds.
