= Exelastis dowi =

Scientific classification
- Kingdom: Animalia
- Phylum: Arthropoda
- Clade: Pancrustacea
- Class: Insecta
- Order: Lepidoptera
- Family: Pterophoridae
- Genus: Exelastis
- Species: E. dowi

Binomial name
- Exelastis dowi Matthews & B. Landry, 2008

Species of plume moth

Exelastis dowi is a species of moth in the genus Exelastis, known from The Bahamas, Belize and Florida in the United States.

Adults are on wing in March in Florida and in April in the Bahamas and Belize, and have a forewing length of 6–9.5 millimetres.
