= Exelastis rhynchosiae =

Scientific classification
- Kingdom: Animalia
- Phylum: Arthropoda
- Class: Insecta
- Order: Lepidoptera
- Family: Pterophoridae
- Genus: Exelastis
- Species: E. rhynchosiae

Binomial name
- Exelastis rhynchosiae (Dyar, 1898)

Synonyms
- Pterophorus rhynchosiae Dyar, 1898

Species of plume moth

Exelastis rhynchosiae is a species of moth in the genus Exelastis, known from Arkansas and Florida in the United States. It is restricted to specific habitats with dry or well drained sandy soils such as pine flatwoods, pine-turkey oak sandhills, sandy open areas of high live oak hammocks, or sand pine-evergreen scrub on ancient dunes where the hostplants grow.

Adults are on wing from April to November, and have a wingspan of 12–18 millimetres.

The larvae feed on Rhynchosia cinerea and possibly Rhynchosia latifolia.
