= Exelastis boireaui =

Scientific classification
- Kingdom: Animalia
- Phylum: Arthropoda
- Clade: Pancrustacea
- Class: Insecta
- Order: Lepidoptera
- Family: Pterophoridae
- Genus: Exelastis
- Species: E. boireaui

Binomial name
- Exelastis boireaui Bigot, 1992

Species of plume moth

Exelastis boireaui is a moth of the family Pterophoridae. It is known from the Democratic Republic of Congo.
