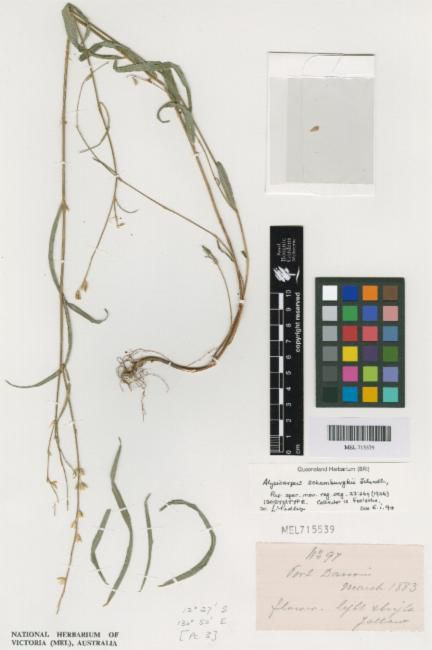
- MEL 07155369A

Conservation status
- Least Concern (TPWCA)

Scientific classification
- Kingdom: Plantae
- Clade: Tracheophytes
- Clade: Angiosperms
- Clade: Eudicots
- Clade: Rosids
- Order: Fabales
- Family: Fabaceae
- Subfamily: Faboideae
- Genus: Alysicarpus
- Species: A. schomburgkii

Binomial name
- Alysicarpus schomburgkii Schindl.
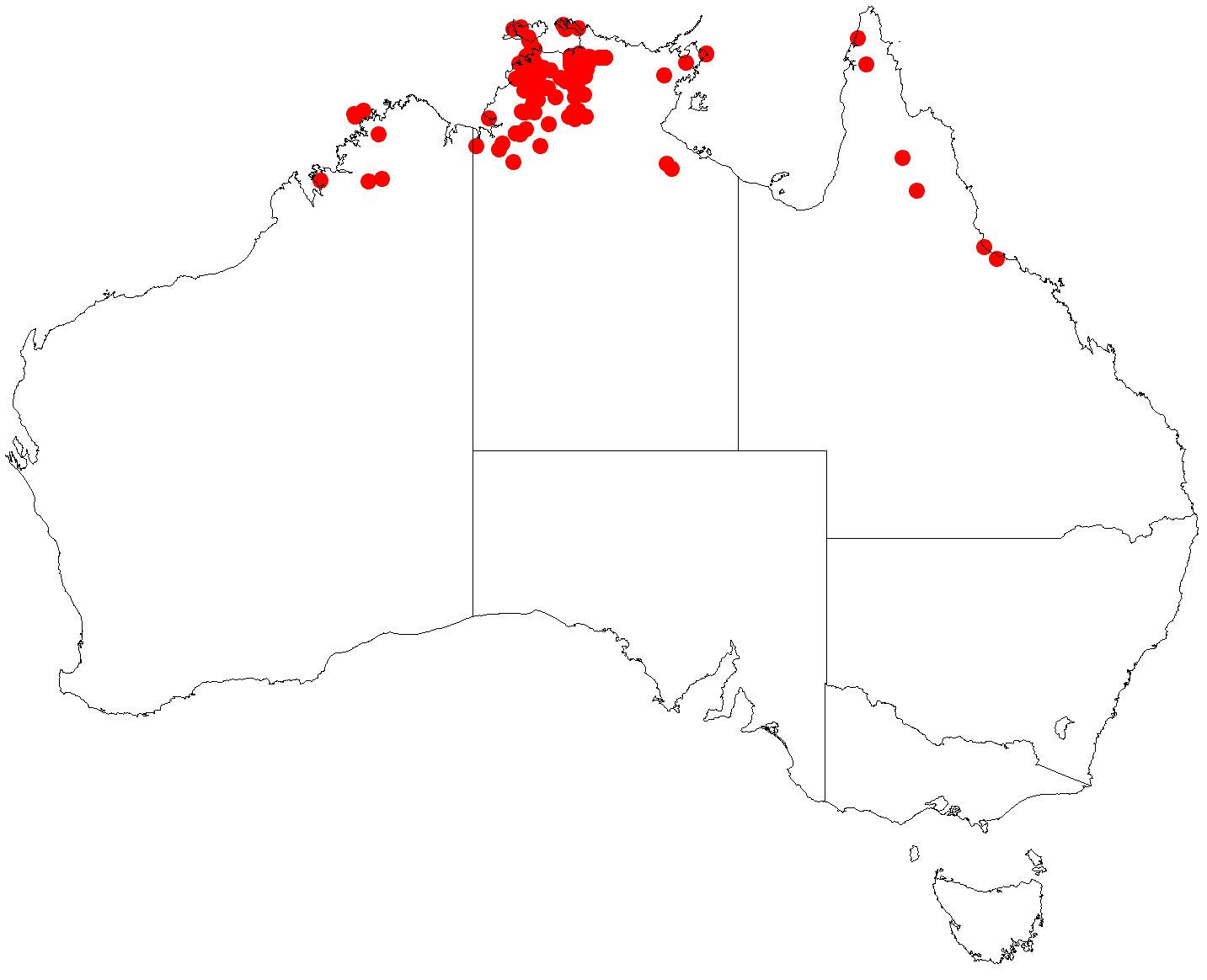
- Occurrence data from GBIF

= Alysicarpus schomburgkii =

Species of legume

Alysicarpus schomburgkii is a species of pea (family Fabaceae) found in Australia, in the Northern Territory, Queensland, and Western Australia. It was first described in 1926 by Anton Schindler from four specimens: two collected at Port Darwin (one by Schomburgk, one by Foelsche) and the others from north Queensland .

== Description ==
Alysicarpus schomburgkii is an annual herb growing to a height of 1 m. The leaves have minute hooked and long simple hairs on their undersides but are without a covering on the upper surface. The leaf rachis is 2–4 mm long and the leaflets are elliptic at the base of the plant, changing to linear-and spear shaped at the apex. They are about 32–150 mm long by 2–7 mm wide. The inflorescence can be up to 370 mm long and has a covering of various kinds of hairs including yellowish resinous simple hairs, septate glandular hairs, hooked hairs and colleters. The flower bracts are 4–6 mm long by about. 2.5 mm wide. The flower stalks are 3–8 mm long. The calyx tube is 1–2 mm long and has narrowly elliptic lobes. The corolla is yellow to yellow-orange. Ovules 3–5. The pod becomes dark grey with age, and is constricted between the seeds, and densely covered with colleters and minute hooked hairs. The seeds are yellow-brown, and elliptic to rhomboidal in shape.

== Distribution ==
In Western Australia it is found in the IBRA regions of Central Kimberley, Dampierland, and Northern Kimberley, while in the Northern Territory it is found in the IBRA regions of Arnhem Coast, Arnhem Plateau, Cape York Peninsula, Central Arnhem, Daly Basin, Darwin Coastal, Gulf Fall and Uplands, Northern Kimberley, Ord Victoria Plain, Pine Creek, Tiwi Cobourg, and Victoria Bonaparte.

== Habitat ==
It is found in well-drained, often skeletal soils.
