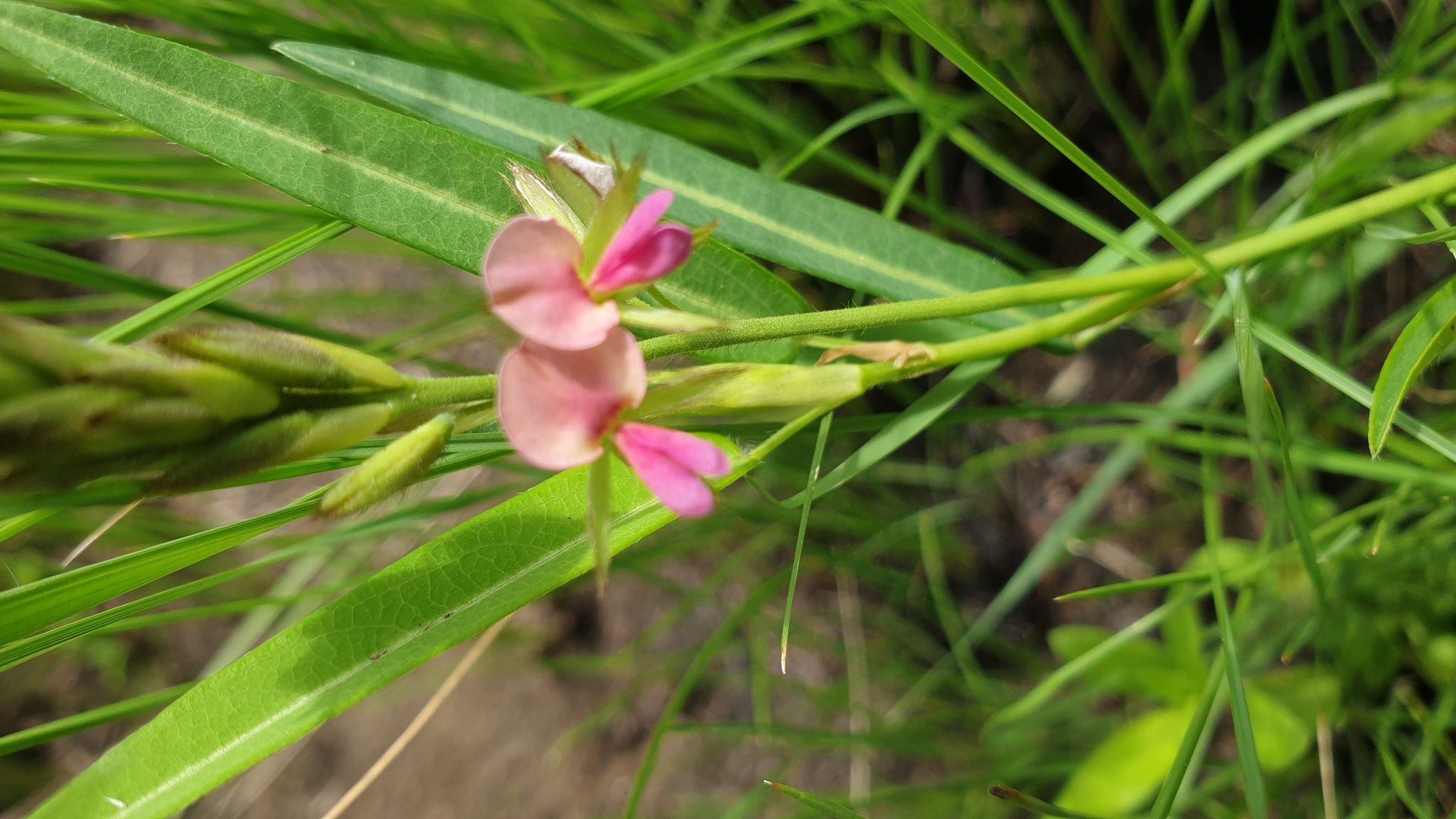
- In South Africa

Scientific classification
- Kingdom: Plantae
- Clade: Embryophytes
- Clade: Tracheophytes
- Clade: Angiosperms
- Clade: Eudicots
- Clade: Rosids
- Order: Fabales
- Family: Fabaceae
- Subfamily: Faboideae
- Genus: Alysicarpus
- Species: A. glumaceus

Binomial name
- Alysicarpus glumaceus (Vahl) DC.

Synonyms
- Alysicarpus hochstetteri A.Rich.; Alysicarpus porrectus Welw. ex Baker; Alysicarpus violaceus (Forssk.) Schindl.; Fabricia porrecta (Welw. ex Baker) Kuntze; Hallia glumacea Wall. ex Wight & Arn.; Hedysarum glumaceum Vahl; Hedysarum violaceum Forssk.

= Alysicarpus glumaceus =

Species of plant

Alysicarpus glumaceus is a plant in the legume family Fabaceae.

== Description ==
Alysicarpus glumaceus is the most used name but it has synonyms such as Alysicarpus hochstetteri, Alysicarpus violaceus (also known as Hedysarum violaceum), Fabricia porrecta, Hallia glumacea, Hedysarum glumaceum. The most common names for Alysicarpus glumaceus is Zimbabwe, alyce clover and/or buffalo clover. It is found in the Plantae kingdom, in the clades Tracheophytes, Angiosperms, Eudicots and Rosids. The Order is Fabales and is in the family Fabaceae. The subfamily is Faboideae, in the genus Alysicarpus and its species name is A.glumaceus.

Alysicarpus glumaceus is a herbaceous plant, with pinkish-orange, red or pale purple floral petals. It is found to occasionally be mixed in with vegetables and cajanus crops. The flowers can be found from October to January. This is an annual herb which can be found to have a woody base standing around 0.15-1.5 m tall, and the stems are narrow and covered with short soft hair. The leaves are oval and elongated, they can reach to a length between .65 cm to 12.5 cm. The flower clusters develop at the tip of the stems, meaning they flower from terminal inflorescence. The outermost layer of floral parts can grow to 4-6 mm in length and about 1mm in width. The leaves primarily can be found overlapping at the base of the plant.

== Distribution and habitat ==
Alysicarpus glumaceus is native to Africa, Asia-Temperate and Asia-Tropical. Within these places, the environment at which it is found in grasslands, woodlands, wooded grasslands, Mediterranean forests, and Boreal forests/Taiga. It is usually found on black cotton soils in swampy grasslands or as a weed in maize fields. Alysicarpus glumaceus can also be found in Australia and Queensland but as an introduced species. It has successfully adapted to multiple biomes, suggesting they can easily replace native species in different biomes. Furthermore, nestedness reflects differential dispersal ability to isolated biome in varying spatial scales. Nestedness in the monophyletic clade (MP) is largely linked to energy availability, resulting in lower species richness in colder biomes than in tropical biomes. However, the presence of some species adapted to harsher environments within this clade is expected given that N-fixation is prevalent in the subfamily Papilionoideae. Both dispersal and adaptation to different biomes have shown to play significant roles in determining the species richness. This phenomenon can be best described as “when dispersal meets adaptation". As a result, it is suggested that stochastic long-distance dispersal may be an additional factor contributing to the species richness dynamics of the MP clade.

== Practical uses of Alysicarpus glumaceus ==
Studies have shown that there may be medicinal applications of Alysicarpus glumaceus. A study conducted in 2019 evaluated potential antimalarial effects of the aerial parts of the plant, which includes the leafs and fruits of Alysicarpus glumaceus. Swiss albino mice were infected with a rodent malaria parasite (Plasmodium berghei) and then evaluated by the percent inhibition of parasitemia. Alysicarpus glumaceus contained methanol aerial extract, which exhibited significant antimalarial properties against Plasmodium berghei. Additionally, the methanol extract had phytochemicals present in medicinal plants with antimalarial effects such as flavonoids, alkaloids, and saponins.

Similarly to the standard malarial drug, the methanol extract exhibited chemo suppression properties; however, chemo suppression was significantly lower in the methanol extract. Using parasitemia suppression and survival time, the effectiveness of methanol extract was evaluated.The methanol extract exhibited a dose-dependent correlation between mice survival time and parasitemia reduction. Using parasitemia suppression and survival time, the effectiveness of methanol extract was evaluated. There is a significant curative effect of the extract that increases the survival time of infected mice. Furthermore, it is estimated that the oral lethal dose of the extract is >5,000 mg/kg. Compared to the extract, the standard malarial drug (Chloroquine) has a lethal dose of 30-50 mg/kg.
