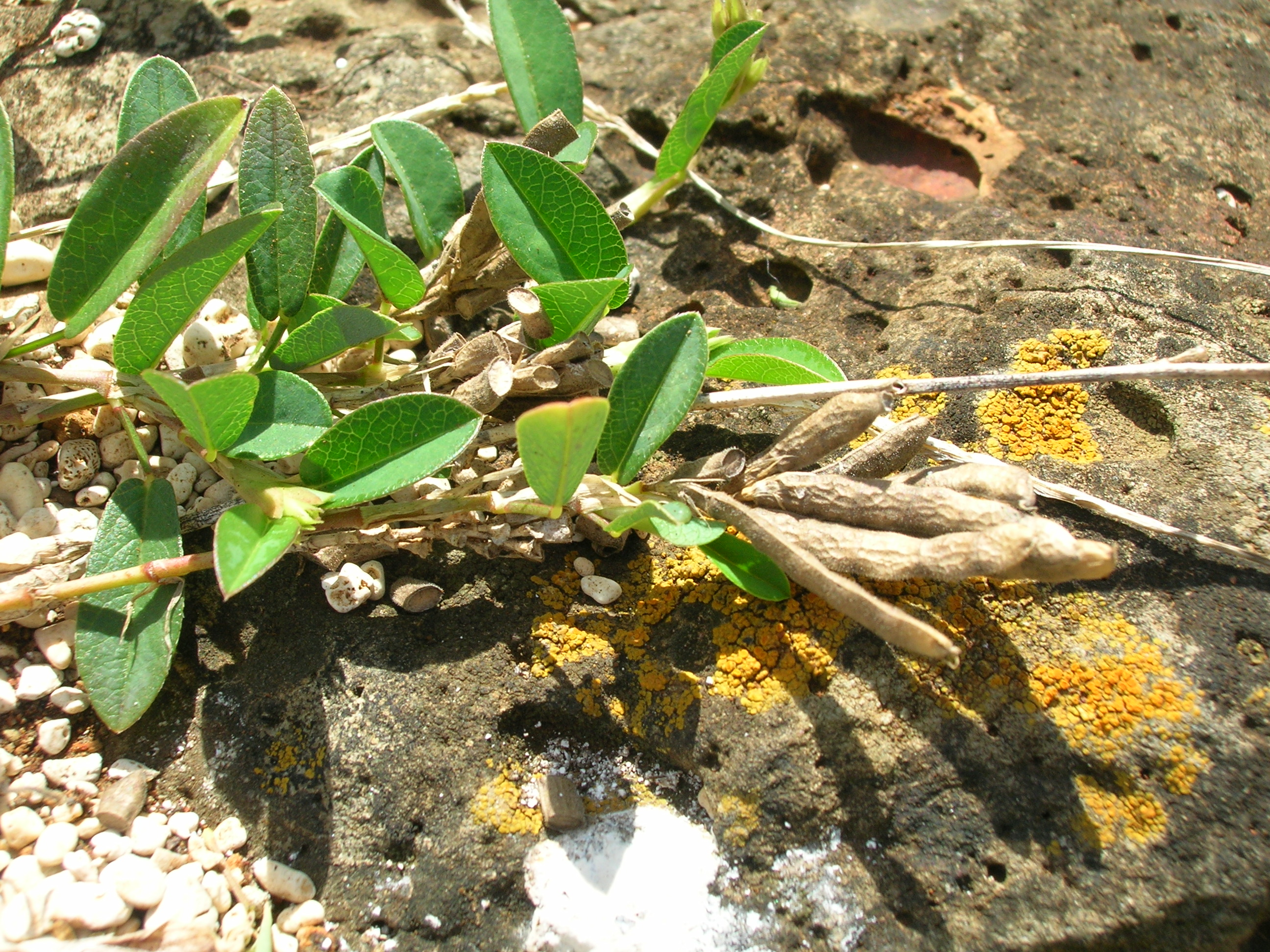

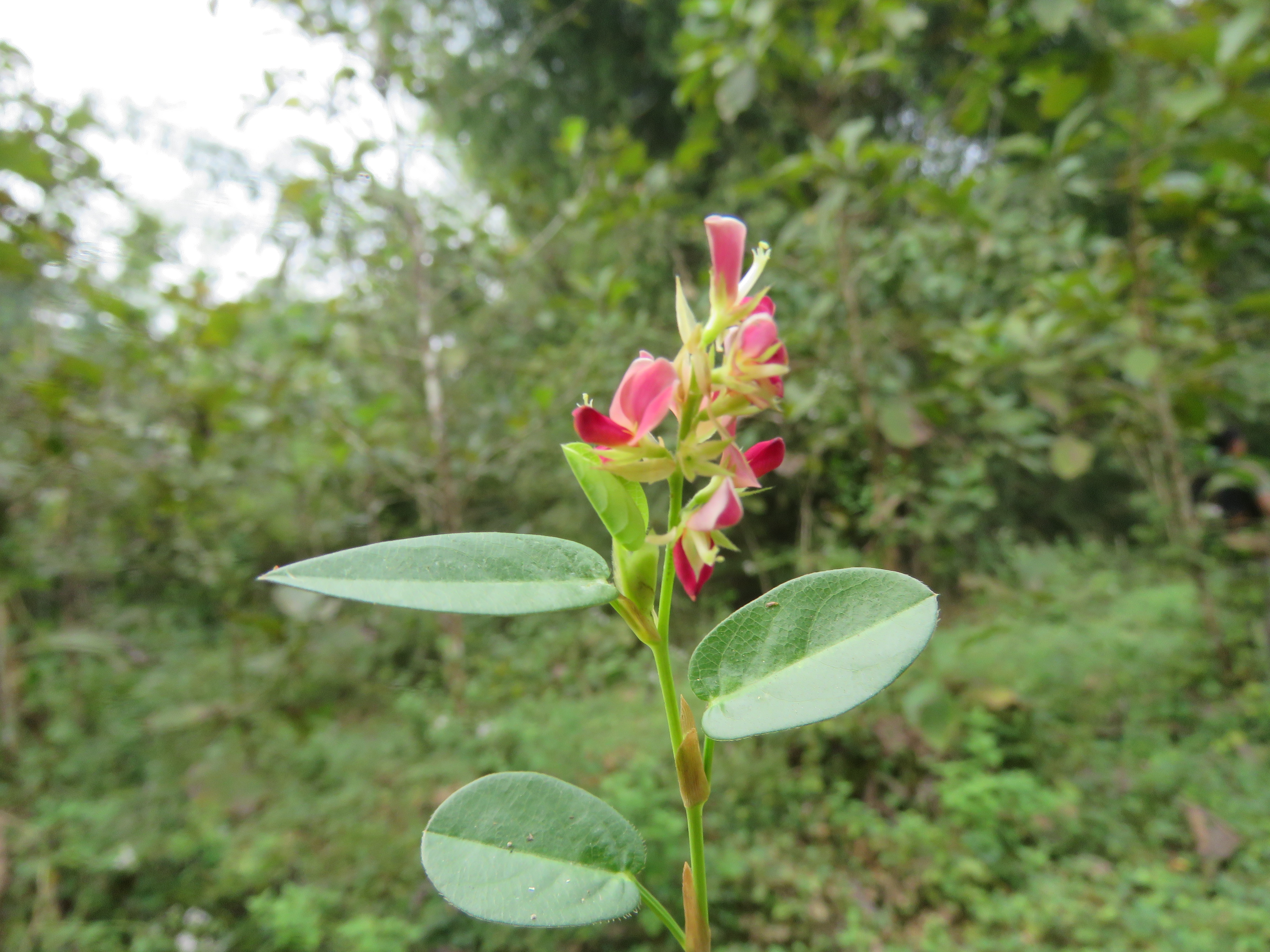

Conservation status
- Secure (NatureServe)

Scientific classification
- Kingdom: Plantae
- Clade: Embryophytes
- Clade: Tracheophytes
- Clade: Spermatophytes
- Clade: Angiosperms
- Clade: Eudicots
- Clade: Rosids
- Order: Fabales
- Family: Fabaceae
- Subfamily: Faboideae
- Genus: Alysicarpus
- Species: A. vaginalis

Binomial name
- Alysicarpus vaginalis (L.) DC.

Synonyms
- Alysicarpus nummularifolius Alysicarpus rupicola Hedysarum cylindricum Hedysarum vaginale

= Alysicarpus vaginalis =

Species of flowering plant in Fabaceae

Alysicarpus vaginalis is a species of flowering plant in the legume family, Fabaceae. It is native to parts of Africa and Asia, and it has been introduced to other continents, such as Australia and the Americas. It is cultivated as a fodder for livestock, for erosion control, and as a green manure. Common names include alyce clover (a name it shares with Alysicarpus rugosus), buffalo clover, buffalo-bur, one-leaf clover, and white moneywort.

== Description ==
This species is an annual or perennial herb; different varieties may be either annual or perennial, and some behave as perennials in wet conditions but grow as annuals in dry regions. The stems take an erect form or run along the ground, more often erect when growing in dense stands. They reach one meter in length and usually have branches. The leaves are not divided into leaflets. The blades are variable in shape and up to about 6.5 centimeters long. Racemes of up to 12 flowers occur at the stem tips and grow from the leaf axils. The flower corolla is half a centimeter long and can be shades of red, purple, blue, or yellow. The fruit is a lightly hairy, cylindrical but compressed legume pod up to 2.5 centimeters long. The dark red seeds are no more than 1.5 millimeters long.

== Cultivation ==
This plant is grown in pastures as forage for livestock and is sometimes cut for hay. Cattle and horses find it palatable, and sheep found it about as palatable as alfalfa in one trial. It is very tolerant of grazing and mowing.

It is most successful in the tropics, but it also grows well in warmer temperate regions. It loses leaves in light frosts and is killed by heavy frosts, but it grows back when winter ends. It tolerates shade and can be grown in the cover of shrubs. It grows in many types of soils, from sands to clays. It does not tolerate high soil salinity.

The crop reportedly yields up to six tons of hay per hectare. If allowed to set seed it yields about 300 kilograms of seed per hectare. To improve its nitrogen fixation for soil improvement the seeds can be inoculated with the rhizobia used for cowpeas.

== Ecology ==
Good companion plants include grasses such as St. Augustine grass (Stenotaphrum secundatum), hurricane grass (Bothriochloa pertusa), and Nadi blue grass (Dichanthium caricosum). It can be grown with other legumes, such as Spanish clover (Desmodium heterophyllum) and showy pigeon pea (Cajanus scarabaeoides).

A main disadvantage of the crop is its susceptibility to root-knot nematodes. Prevention measures include growing the plant on heavier soils, which reduce the severity of infestation, and to use certain cultivars that may be more resistant to nematodes.

Other pests of the plant include leaf-mining caterpillars. It is host to the plume moth Exelastis crepuscularis. A number of seed beetles of the genus Bruchidius complete their larval development in the seeds of A. vaginalis, including two recently described from the plant.

This species can become weedy. It has been a weed of golf courses, where it easily survives frequent mowing. It is a weed of roadsides and other disturbed habitat in Guam, Hawaii, and Fiji. It is considered an invasive species on many Pacific Islands.
