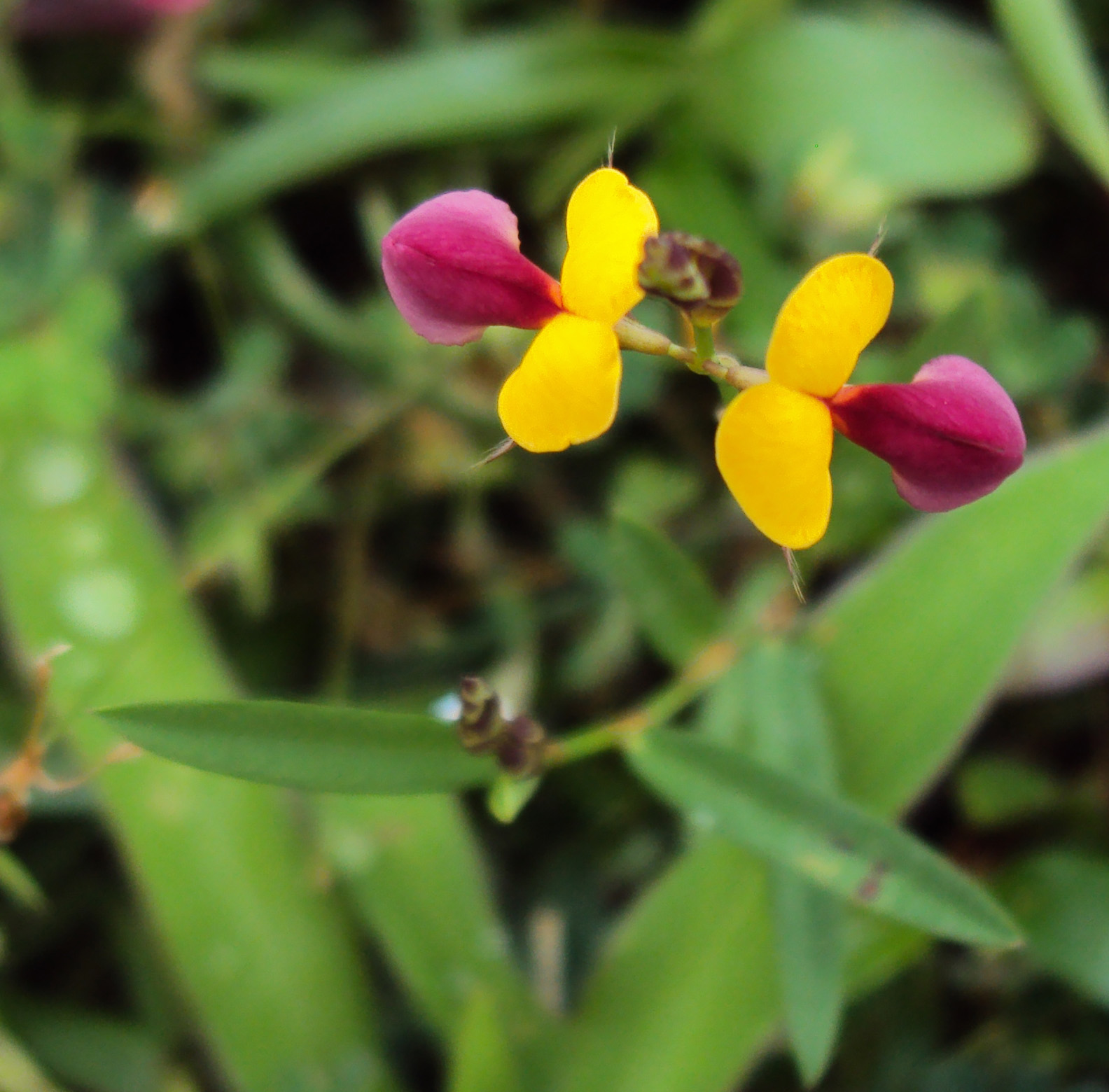
- Alysicarpus bupleurifolius

Scientific classification
- Kingdom: Plantae
- Clade: Tracheophytes
- Clade: Angiosperms
- Clade: Eudicots
- Clade: Rosids
- Order: Fabales
- Family: Fabaceae
- Subfamily: Faboideae
- Tribe: Desmodieae
- Subtribe: Desmodiinae
- Genus: Alysicarpus; Desv. (1813), nom. cons.

Synonyms
- Fabricia Scop. (1777); Hallia J.St.-Hil. (1812), nom. illeg.; Hegetschweilera Heer & Regel (1842)

= Alysicarpus =

Genus of legumes

Alysicarpus is a genus of flowering plants in the legume family, Fabaceae. It is distributed in tropical and subtropical regions of Africa, Asia, and Australia. Species are known generally as moneyworts. Unusually for legumes, the leaves are simple (not compound).

== Species ==
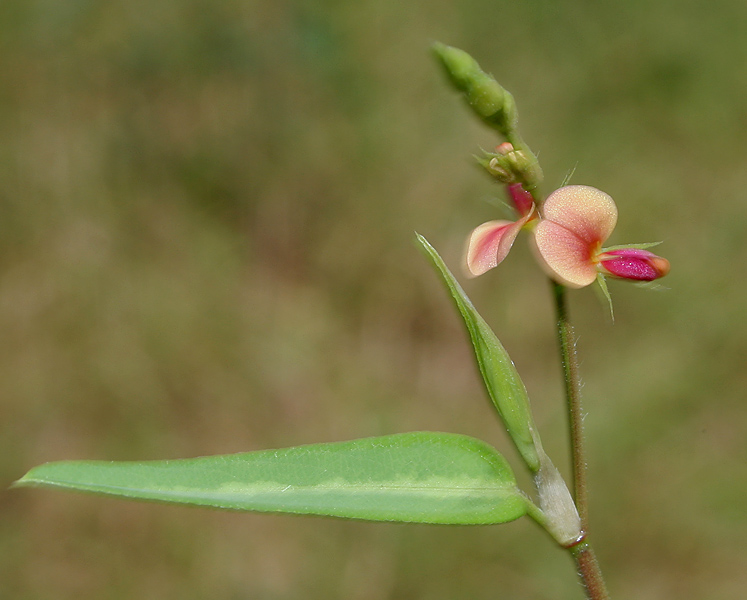
Alysicarpus longifolius

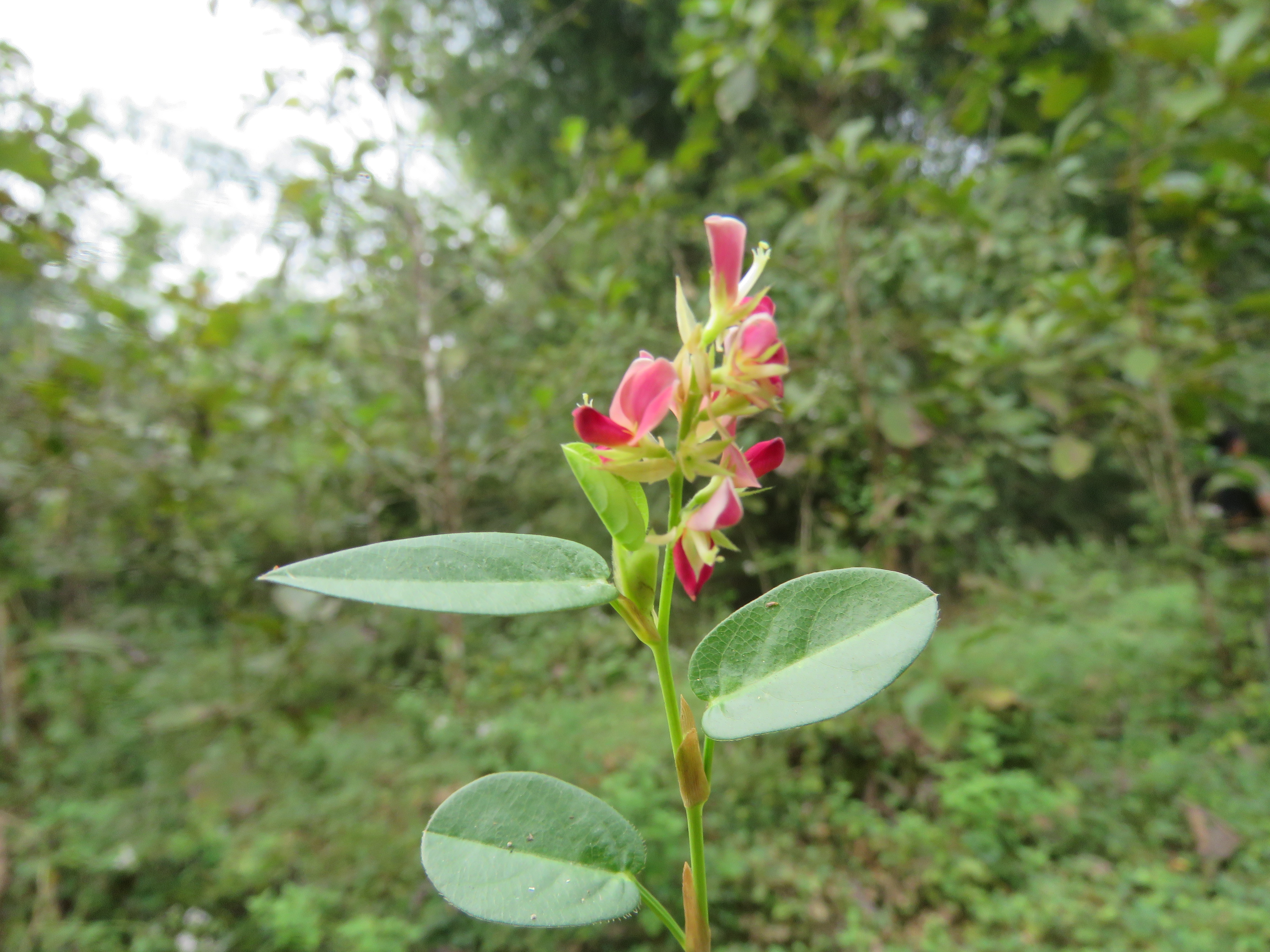
Alysicarpus vaginalis

As of August 2023, Plants of the World Online accepts the following 37 species:

- Alysicarpus aurantiacus Pedley
- Alysicarpus bhuibavadensis Dalavi, Bramhad., Pokle & S.R.Yadav
- Alysicarpus brownii Schindl.
- Alysicarpus bupleurifolius (L.) DC. – sweet alys
- Alysicarpus ferrugineus Hochst. & Steud. ex A.Rich.
- Alysicarpus gamblei Schindl.
- Alysicarpus gautalensis Gholami & A.K.Pandey
- Alysicarpus glumaceus (Vahl) DC.
- Alysicarpus hamosus Edgew.
- Alysicarpus hendersonii Schindl.
- Alysicarpus heterophyllus (Baker) Jafri & Ali
- Alysicarpus heyneanus Wight & Arn.
- Alysicarpus longifolius (Rottler ex Spreng.) Wight & Arn.
- Alysicarpus luteovexillatus Naik & Pokle
- Alysicarpus major Pedley
- Alysicarpus misquittae S.M.Almeida & M.R.Almeida
- Alysicarpus monilifer (L.) DC.
- Alysicarpus muelleri Schindl.
- Alysicarpus naikianus Pokle
- Alysicarpus ovalifolius (Schumach.) J.Léonard – alyce clover
- Alysicarpus pokleanus Gholami & A.K.Pandey
- Alysicarpus prainii Schindl.
- Alysicarpus pubescens Y.W.Law
- Alysicarpus quartinianus A.Rich.
- Alysicarpus roxburghianus Thoth. & Pramanik
- Alysicarpus rugosus (Willd.) DC. – red moneywort
- Alysicarpus salim-alii S.M.Almeida & M.R.Almeida
- Alysicarpus sanjappae S.Chavan, Sardesai & Pokle
- Alysicarpus saplianus Pokle
- Alysicarpus scariosus (Rottler ex Spreng.) Graham
- Alysicarpus schomburgkii Schindl.
- Alysicarpus sedgwickii S.M.Almeida & M.R.Almeida
- Alysicarpus suffruticosus Pedley
- Alysicarpus tetragonolobus Edgew.
- Alysicarpus vaginalis (L.) DC. – white moneywort, buffalo clover, one-leaf clover
- Alysicarpus yunnanensis Yen C.Yang & P.H.Huang
- Alysicarpus zeyheri Harv.
