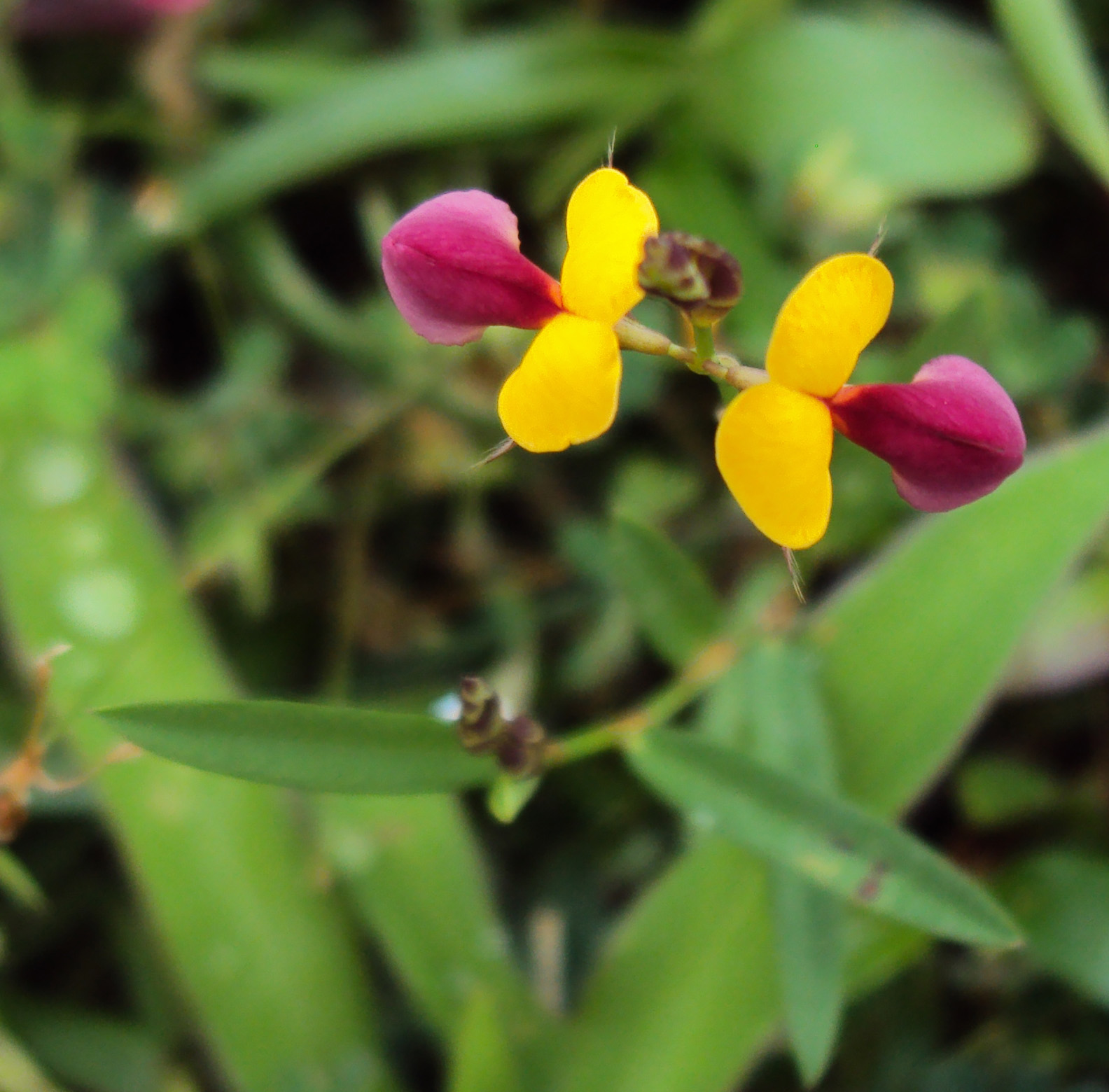

Conservation status
- Least Concern (IUCN 3.1)

Scientific classification
- Kingdom: Plantae
- Clade: Tracheophytes
- Clade: Angiosperms
- Clade: Eudicots
- Clade: Rosids
- Order: Fabales
- Family: Fabaceae
- Subfamily: Faboideae
- Genus: Alysicarpus
- Species: A. bupleurifolius

Binomial name
- Alysicarpus bupleurifolius (L.) DC.

Synonyms
- Fabricia bupleurifolia (DC.) Kuntze; Hallia bupleurifolia J.St.-Hil.; Hedysarum bupleurifolium L.; Hedysarum gramineum Retz.; Hedysarum rugosum Sieber ex DC.; Hedysarum virgatum Buch.-Ham. ex Wall.

= Alysicarpus bupleurifolius =

Species of plant

Alysicarpus bupleurifolius, the sweet alys, is a perennial herb in the legume family Fabaceae, native to tropical Asia.

== Distribution and habitat ==
Alysicarpus bupleurifolius is native to an area from Pakistan east to Taiwan and south to New Guinea. Its habitat is in forests, shrubland and inland wetlands.
