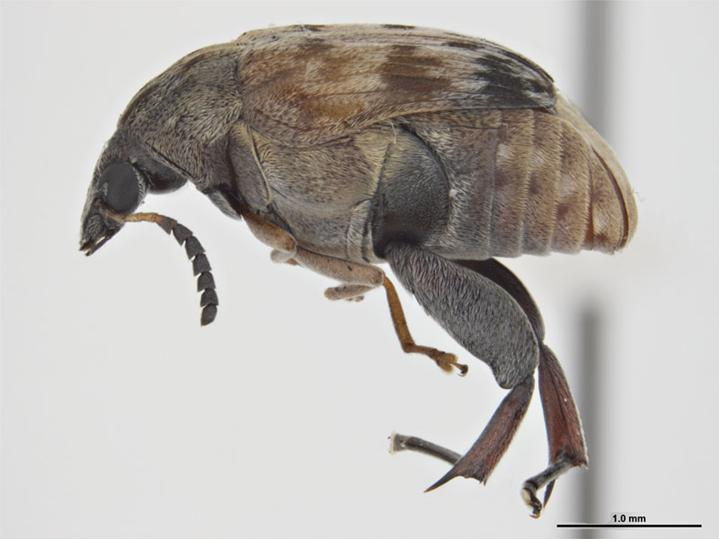
- Bruchidius endotubercularis

Scientific classification
- Kingdom: Animalia
- Phylum: Arthropoda
- Class: Insecta
- Order: Coleoptera
- Suborder: Polyphaga
- Infraorder: Cucujiformia
- Family: Chrysomelidae
- Subfamily: Bruchinae
- Tribe: Bruchini
- Genus: Bruchidius; Schilsky, 1905

Species
- about 300

= Bruchidius =

Genus of beetles

Bruchidius is a genus of beetles in the bean weevil subfamily (Bruchinae) of the leaf beetle family, Chrysomelidae. Most are native to the Old World.

The larvae of these beetles often feed on plants of the legume family, Fabaceae. The species Bruchidius siliquastri, for example, is a seed beetle named for its host, the Judas tree (Cercis siliquastrum). It lives on other Cercis species, as well. One of several groups within the genus, the B. centromaculatus group, are mostly limited to acacias. The genus can also be found on plants of the carrot and parsley family, Apiaceae, and the aster family, Asteraceae.

There are around 300 species in this genus.

Species include:

- Bruchidius antennatus (Wollastone, 1864)
- Bruchidius biguttatus (Olivier, 1795)
- Bruchidius brincki Decelle, 1975
- Bruchidius chloroticus (Dalman, 1833)
- Bruchidius cisti (Fabricius, 1775)
- Bruchidius endotubercularis
- Bruchidius faroensis
- Bruchidius holosericeus (Schönherr, 1832)
- Bruchidius lichenicola (Wollaston, 1854)
- Bruchidius lineatopygus
- Bruchidius lutescens (Blanchard, 1844)
- Bruchidius meridionalis Anton & Delobel, 2003
- Bruchidius nodieri
- Bruchidius obscurevittatus
- Bruchidius pauper (Boheman, 1829)
- Bruchidius raddianae Anton & Delobel, 2003
- Bruchidius siliquastri Delobel, 2007
- Bruchidius simulans
- Bruchidius unicolor (Olivier, 1795)
- Bruchidius villosus (Fabricius, 1792) – Scotch broom bruchid

== Gallery ==
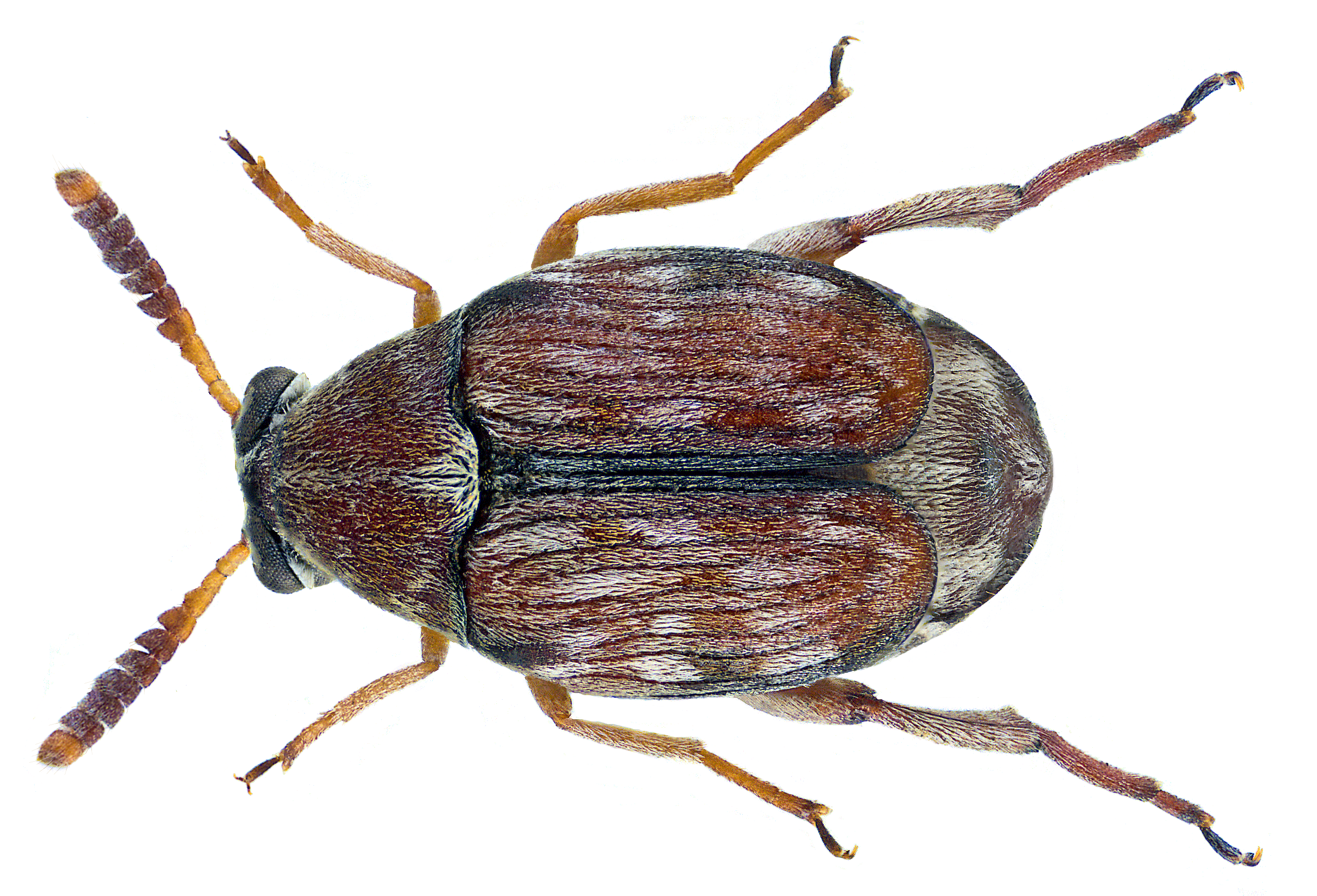
Bruchidius buettikeri

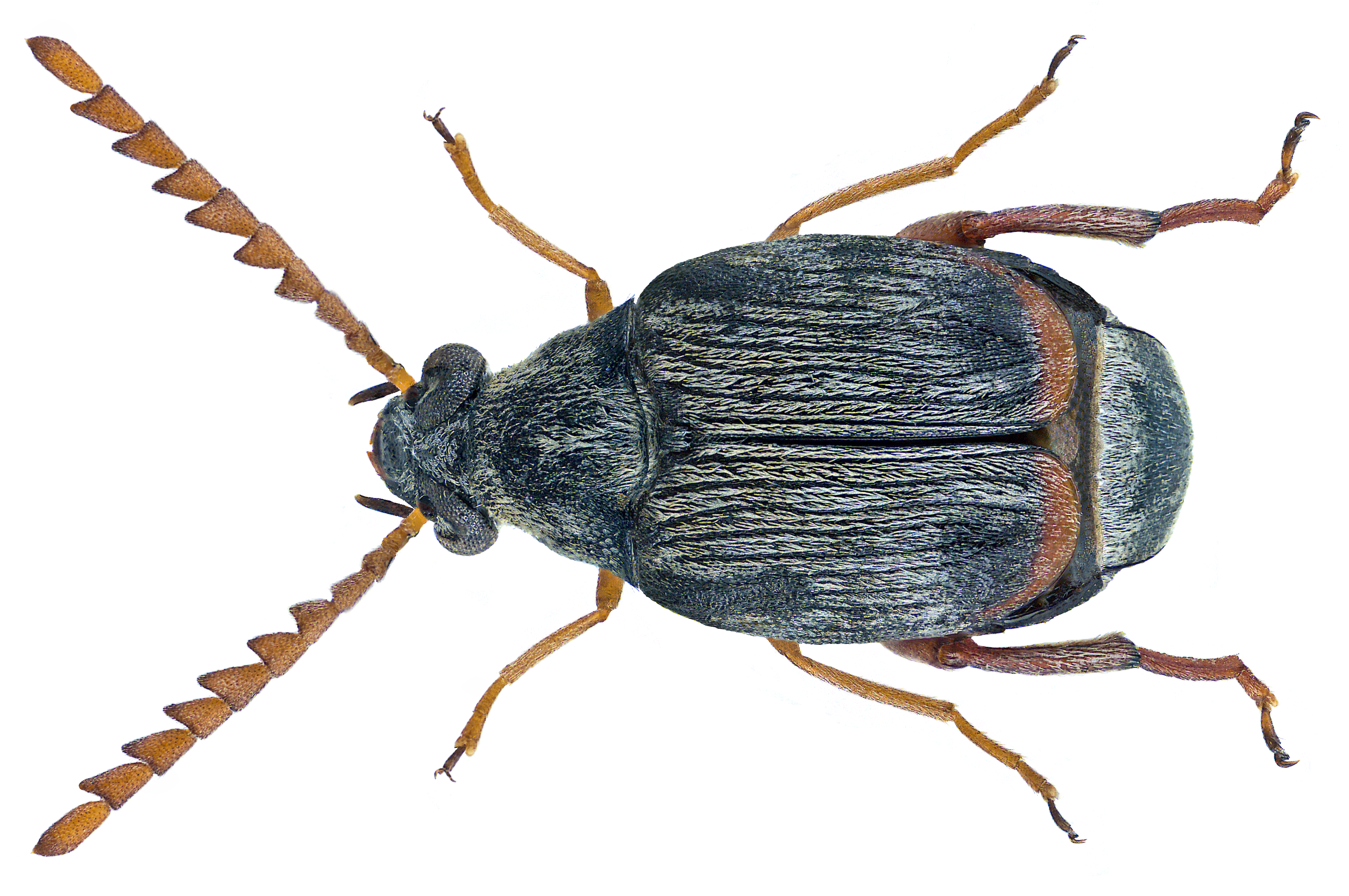
Bruchidius nalandus

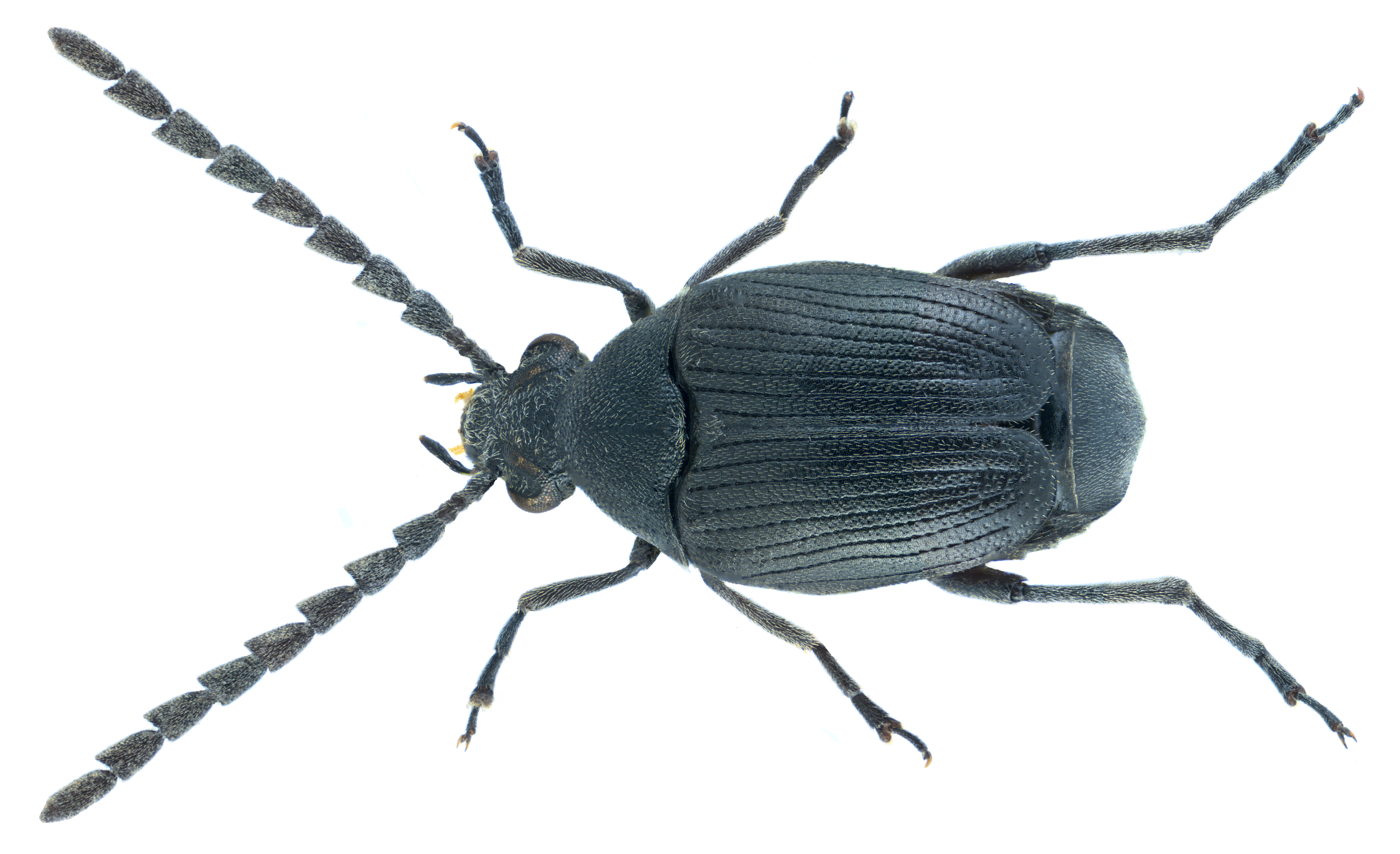
Bruchidius nudus

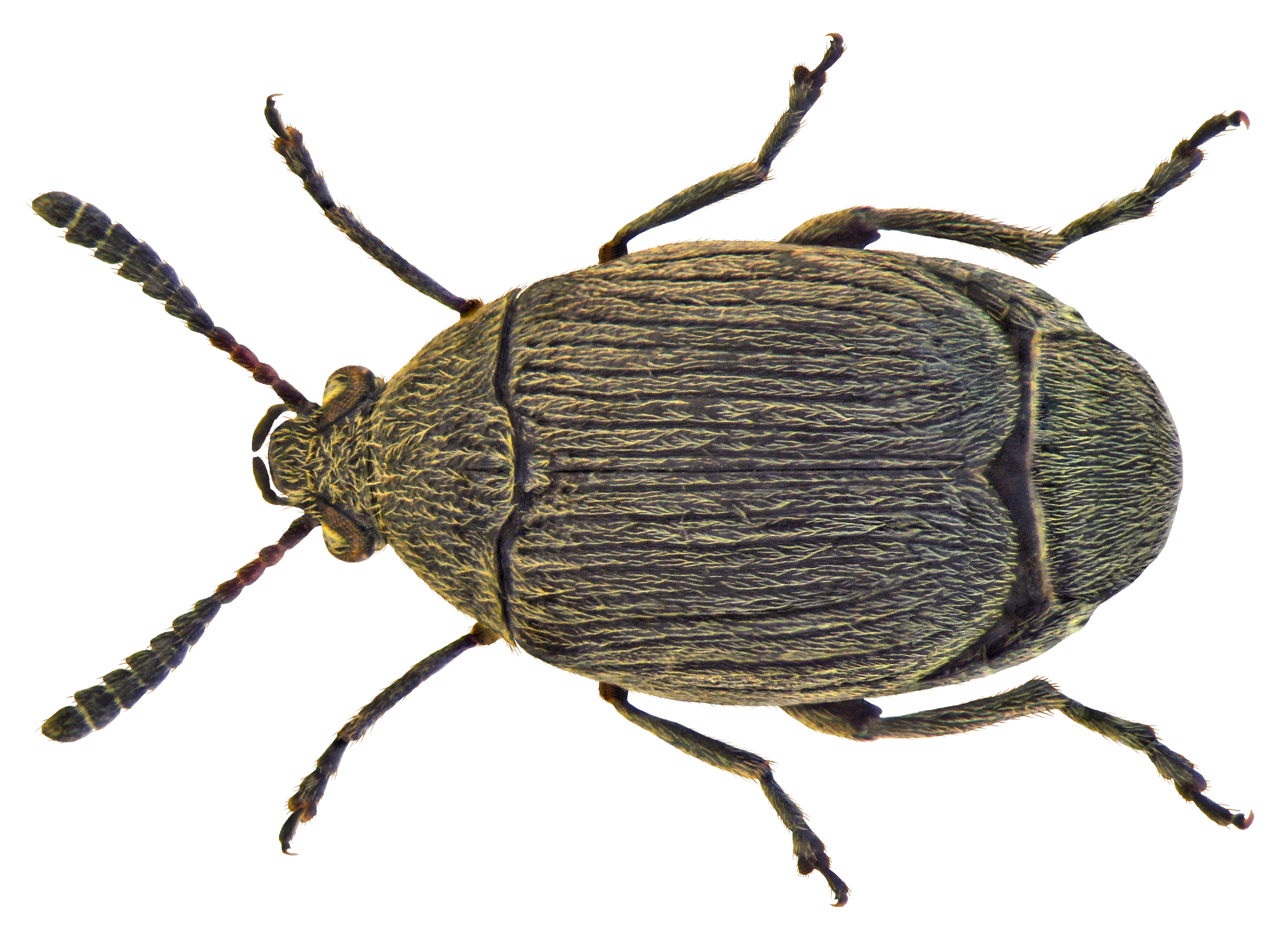
Bruchidius villosus
