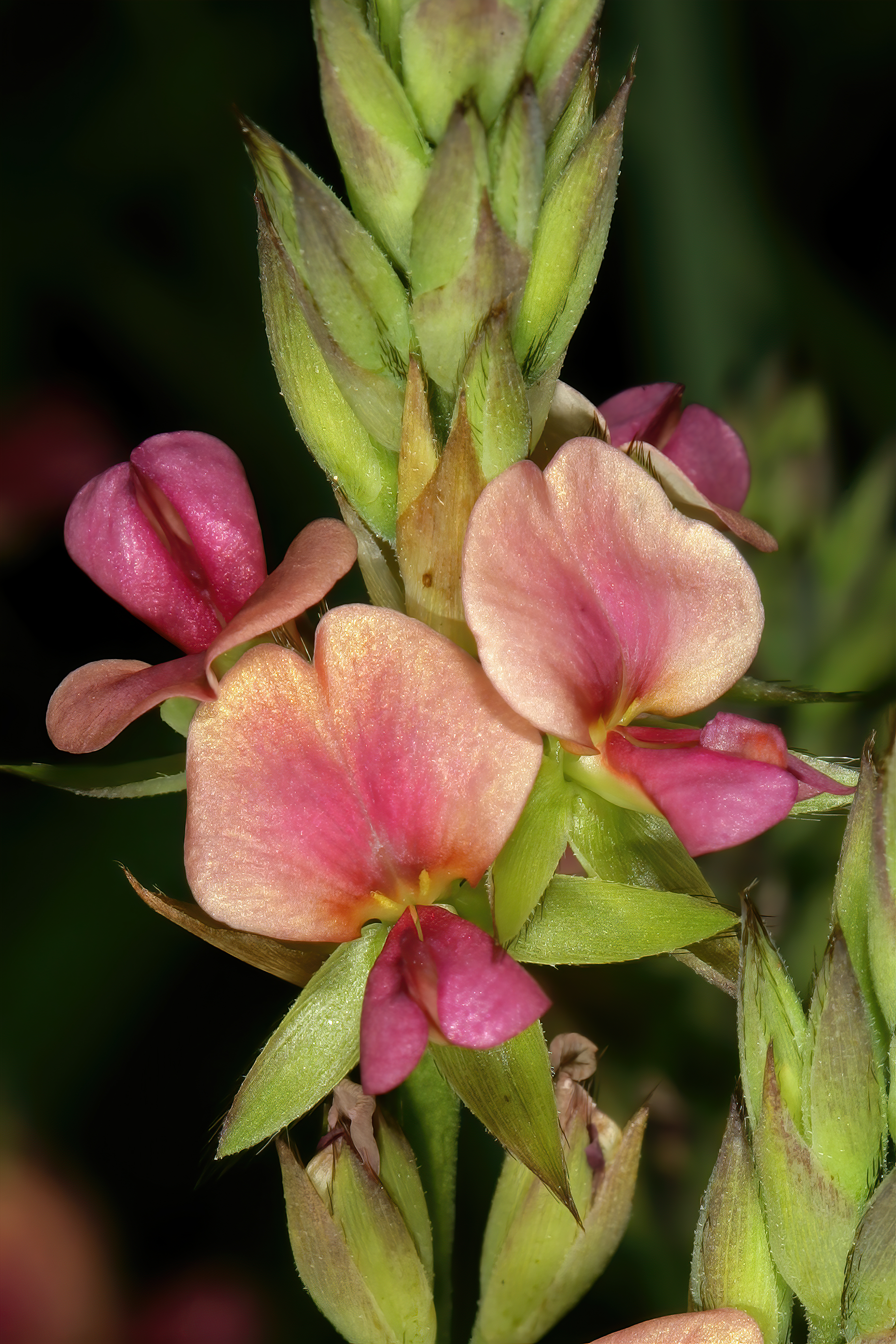
- Flowers of Alysicarpus rugosus subsp. perennirufus
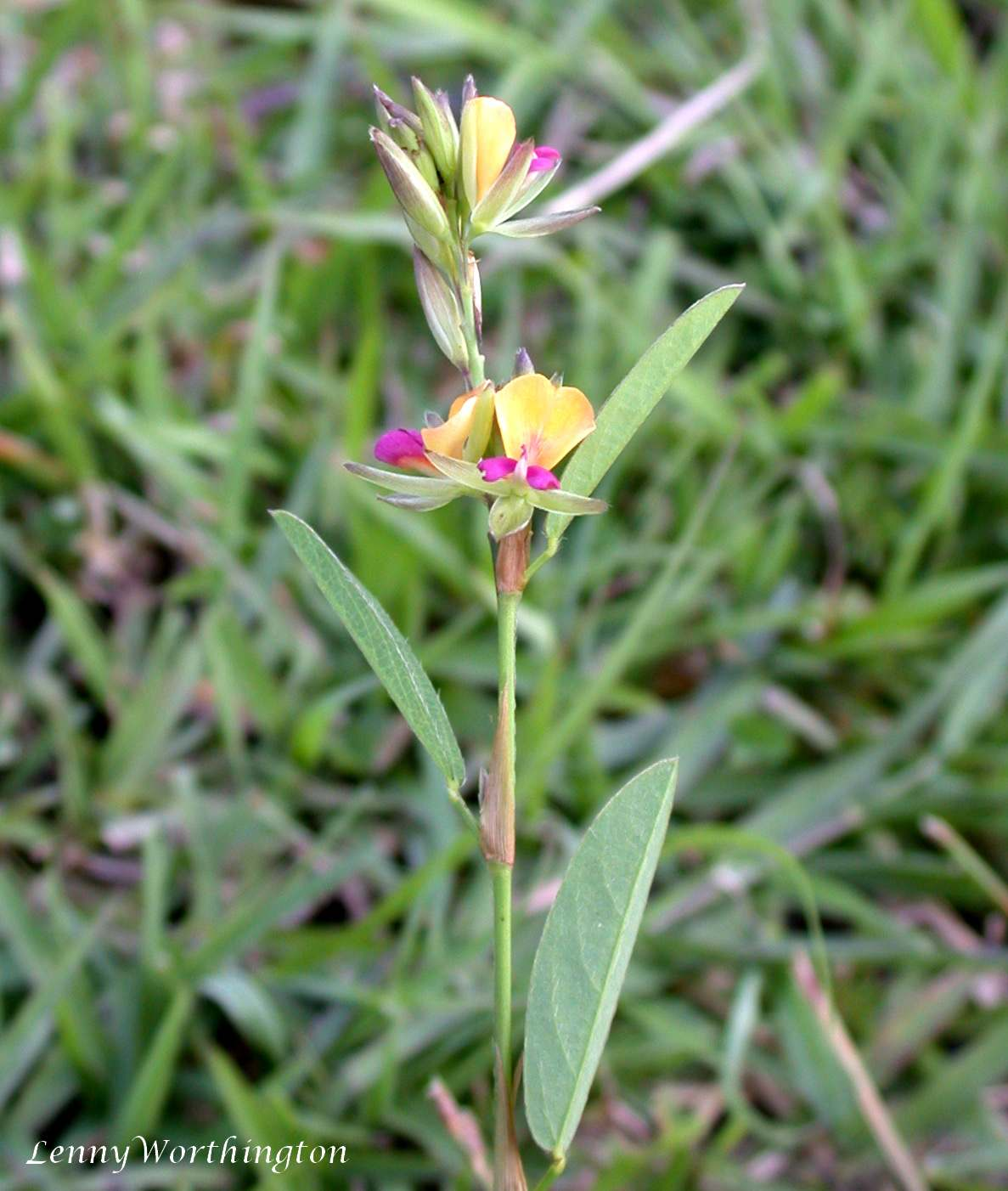
- In Thailand

Scientific classification
- Kingdom: Plantae
- Clade: Tracheophytes
- Clade: Angiosperms
- Clade: Eudicots
- Clade: Rosids
- Order: Fabales
- Family: Fabaceae
- Subfamily: Faboideae
- Genus: Alysicarpus
- Species: A. rugosus

Binomial name
- Alysicarpus rugosus (Willd.) DC.

Synonyms
- List: Alysicarpus bracteus X.F.Gao; Alysicarpus bupleurifolius Wall.; Alysicarpus glaber E.Mey.; Alysicarpus glumaceus Wall.; Alysicarpus lupulinus Stocks ex Baker; Alysicarpus pilifera Wall.; Alysicarpus polygonoides Welw. ex Romariz; Alysicarpus pylifer Steud.; Alysicarpus rugosus var. longiexsertus Domin; Alysicarpus styracifolius Wight & Arn.; Alysicarpus timorensis Span.; Alysicarpus violaceus var. pilosus Schindl.; Alysicarpus wallichii Wight & Arn.; Desmodium ovalifolium Walp.; Desmodium thonningianum D.Dietr.; Fabricia rugosa (Willd.) Kuntze; Hedysarum glumaceum Roxb.; Hedysarum gramineum Buch.-Ham. ex Wall.; Hedysarum graminifolium Roxb. ex Wall.; Hedysarum rugosum Willd.; Hedysarum styracifolium Roxb.

= Alysicarpus rugosus =

Species of plant

Alysicarpus rugosus, the red moneywort, rough chainpea, or alyce clover (a name it shares with Alysicarpus vaginalis), is a widespread species of flowering plant in the family Fabaceae. It is native to the seasonally dry tropics of Africa, Oman, Asia, and Australia. A perennial herb reaching 1.5 m (5 ft), it is typically found in wet areas, from dense forests to wastelands, at elevations from 600 to 1,200 m (2,000 to 3,900 ft). It is used as a green manure. It is very palatable to cattle and has found some use as a dry season forage.

== Subtaxa ==
The following subspecies are accepted:

- Alysicarpus rugosus subsp. perennirufus J.Léonard – central and southern Africa
- Alysicarpus rugosus subsp. reticulatus Verdc. – Malawi, Tanzania, Zambia
- Alysicarpus rugosus subsp. rugosus – entire range, and introduced to Florida
