= List of moths of Australia (Pterophoridae) =

Partial list of Australian moths

This is a list of the Australian moth species of the family Pterophoridae. It also acts as an index to the species articles and forms part of the full List of moths of Australia.

== Deuterocopinae ==
- Deuterocopus atrapex T. B. Fletcher, 1909
- Deuterocopus honoratus Meyrick, 1921
- Deuterocopus socotranus Rebel, 1907
- Deuterocopus tengstroemi Zeller, 1852
- Hexadactilia civilis Meyrick, 1921
- Hexadactilia trilobata T. B. Fletcher, 1910

== Ochyroticinae ==
- Ochyrotica kurandica Arenberger, 1988

== Pterophorinae ==
- Bipunctiphorus euctimena (Turner, 1913)
- Cosmoclostis aglaodesma Meyrick, 1886
- Cosmoclostis hemiadelpha T. B. Fletcher, 1947
- Cosmoclostis pesseuta Meyrick, 1906
- Hellinsia balanotes (Meyrick, 1908)
- Hellinsia lienigianus (Zeller, 1852)
- Hellinsia tinctidactylus (Newman, 1856)
- Hepalastis pumilio (Zeller, 1873)
- Imbophorus aptalis (Walker, 1864)
- Imbophorus leucophasma (Turner, 1911)
- Imbophorus pallidus Arenberger, 1991
- Lantanophaga pusillidactyla (Walker, 1864)
- Megalorhipida leucodactylus (Fabricius, 1794) (syn: Trichoptilus adelphodes Meyrick, 1887)
- Nippoptilia cinctipedalis (Walker, 1864)
- Oxyptilus regulus Meyrick, 1906
- Platyptilia celidotus (Meyrick, 1885)
- Platyptilia isodactyla (Zeller, 1852)
- (Platyptilia omissalis T. B. Fletcher, 1926)
- Pterophorus albidus (Zeller, 1852)
- Pterophorus lacteipennis (Walker, 1864)
- Sinpunctiptilia emissalis Walker, 1864
- Sinpunctiptilia tasmaniae Arenberger, 2006
- Sphenarches anisodactylus (Walker, 1864)
- Sphenarches zanclistes (Meyrick, 1905)
- Stangeia xerodes (Meyrick, 1886)
- Stenodacma pyrrhodes (Meyrick, 1889)
- Stenoptilia leuconephes (Meyrick, 1886)
- Stenoptilia phaeonephes (Meyrick, 1886)
- Stenoptilia zophodactylus (Duponchel, 1840)
- Stenoptilodes taprobanes (R. Felder & Rogenhofer, 1875)
- Tetraschalis arachnodes Meyrick, 1887
- Tomotilus saitoi Yano, 1961
- Trichoptilus ceramodes Meyrick, 1886
- Trichoptilus inclitus T.P. Lucas, 1892
- Trichoptilus scythrodes Meyrick, 1886
- Wheeleria spilodactylus (Curtis, 1827)
- Xyroptila elegans Kovtunovich & Ustjuzhanin, 2006
- Xyroptila kuranda Kovtunovich & Ustjuzhanin, 2006
- Xyroptila marmarias Meyrick, 1908
- Xyroptila peltastes (Meyrick, 1908)
- Xyroptila uluru Kovtunovich & Ustjuzhanin, 2006
