= Gillmeria =

- Gillmeria ochrodactyla oviposits on tansy

Scientific classification
- Kingdom: Animalia
- Phylum: Arthropoda
- Class: Insecta
- Order: Lepidoptera
- Family: Pterophoridae
- Subfamily: Pterophorinae
- Tribe: Platyptiliini
- Genus: Gillmeria; Tutt, 1905

Plume moth genus

Gillmeria is a genus of moths in the family Pterophoridae. The genus was described by the English schoolteacher and entomologist, James William Tutt in 1905.

== Species ==
- Gillmeria albertae
- Gillmeria armeniaca
- Gillmeria irakella
- Gillmeria macrornis
- Gillmeria melanoschista
- Gillmeria miantodactylus
- Gillmeria ochrodactyla
- Gillmeria omissalis
- Gillmeria pallidactyla
- Gillmeria rhusiodactyla
- Gillmeria scutata
- Gillmeria stenoptiloides
- Gillmeria tetradactyla
- Gillmeria vesta
