= X. elegans =

X. elegans may refer to:

- Xanthoria elegans, the elegant sunburst lichen, a lichenized fungus species
- Xiphorhynchus elegans, the elegant woodcreeper, a bird species found in Bolivia, Brazil, Colombia, Ecuador and Peru
- Xyroptila elegans, a moth species found in north-eastern New Guinea and Australia
