= Gillmeria miantodactylus =

Scientific classification
- Kingdom: Animalia
- Phylum: Arthropoda
- Clade: Pancrustacea
- Class: Insecta
- Order: Lepidoptera
- Family: Pterophoridae
- Genus: Gillmeria
- Species: G. miantodactylus

Binomial name
- Gillmeria miantodactylus (Zeller, 1841)

Synonyms
- Pterophorus miantodactylus Zeller, 1841

Species of plume moth

Gillmeria miantodactylus is a moth of the family Pterophoridae. It is found in France, Austria, Hungary, Romania, Bulgaria, North Macedonia, Ukraine, Russia and Asia Minor.

The larvae possibly feed on Scabiosa ochroleuca.
