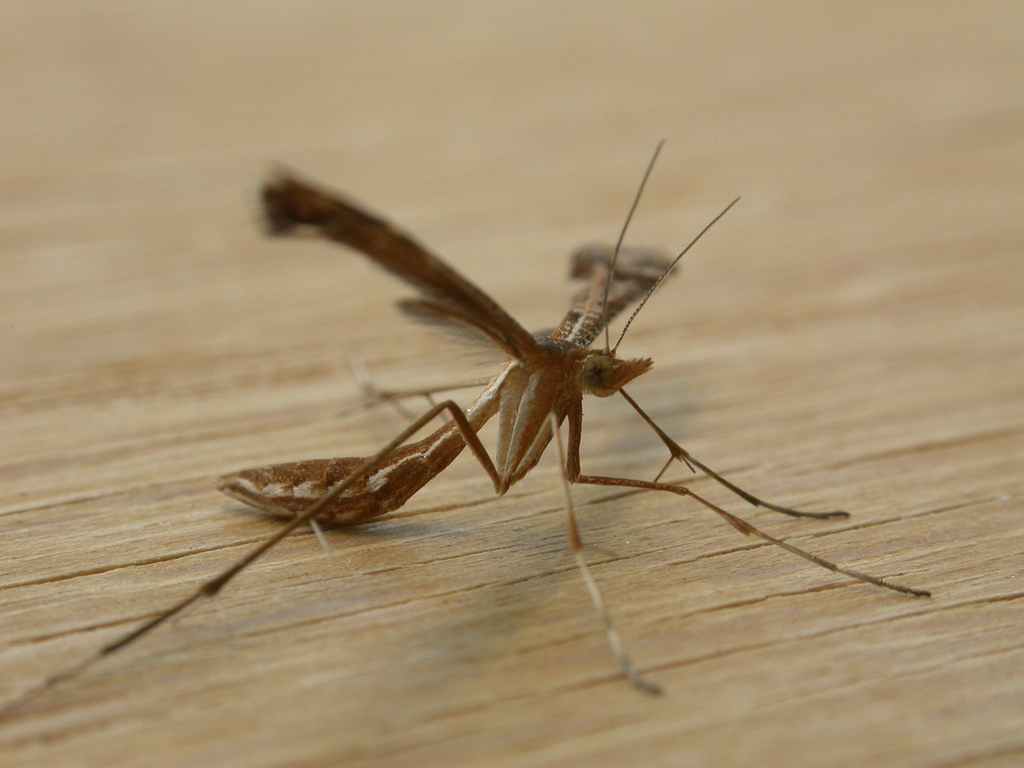
- Sinpunctiptilia emissalis

Scientific classification
- Kingdom: Animalia
- Phylum: Arthropoda
- Class: Insecta
- Order: Lepidoptera
- Family: Pterophoridae
- Tribe: Platyptiliini
- Genus: Sinpunctiptilia; Arenberger, 2006

= Sinpunctiptilia =

Plume moth genus

Sinpunctiptilia is a genus of moths in the family Pterophoridae.

== Species ==
- Sinpunctiptilia emissalis Walker, 1864
- Sinpunctiptilia tasmaniae Arenberger, 2006
