= Gillmeria vesta =

Scientific classification
- Domain: Eukaryota
- Kingdom: Animalia
- Phylum: Arthropoda
- Class: Insecta
- Order: Lepidoptera
- Family: Pterophoridae
- Genus: Gillmeria
- Species: G. vesta

Binomial name
- Gillmeria vesta (Ustjuzhanin, 1996)

Synonyms
- Platyptilia vesta Ustjuzhanin, 1996; Gillmeria veasta

Species of plume moth

Gillmeria vesta is a moth of the family Pterophoridae. It is found in the Russian Far East.
