= Xyroptila monomotapa =

Scientific classification
- Kingdom: Animalia
- Phylum: Arthropoda
- Clade: Pancrustacea
- Class: Insecta
- Order: Lepidoptera
- Family: Pterophoridae
- Genus: Xyroptila
- Species: X. monomotapa

Binomial name
- Xyroptila monomotapa Kovtunovich & Ustjuzhanin, 2006

Species of plume moth

Xyroptila monomotapa is a moth of the family Pterophoridae which is endemic to Mozambique.
