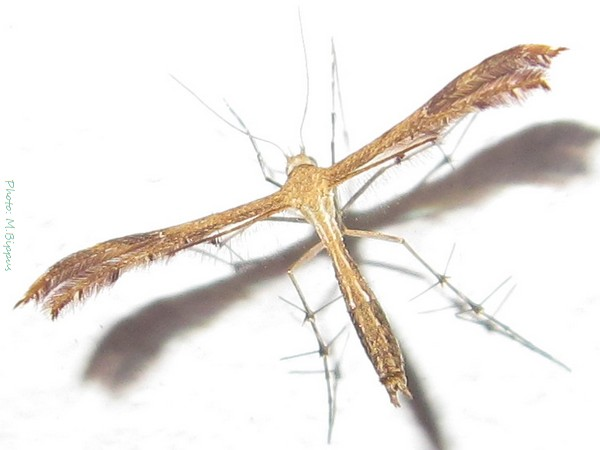
- Pterophorus wahlbergi (Stenodacma wahlbergi) (Zeller, 1852)

Scientific classification
- Kingdom: Animalia
- Phylum: Arthropoda
- Class: Insecta
- Order: Lepidoptera
- Family: Pterophoridae
- Tribe: Oxyptilini
- Genus: Stenodacma; Amsel, 1959

= Stenodacma =

Plume moth genus

Stenodacma is a genus of moths in the family Pterophoridae.

== Species ==
- Stenodacma cognata Gielis, 2009
- Stenodacma pyrrhodes (Meyrick, 1889)
- Stenodacma richardi Ustjuzhanin et Kovtunovich, 2010
- Stenodacma wahlbergi (Zeller, 1851)
- Stenodacma iranella Hans Georg Amsel, 1959
