= Gillmeria armeniaca =

Scientific classification
- Domain: Eukaryota
- Kingdom: Animalia
- Phylum: Arthropoda
- Class: Insecta
- Order: Lepidoptera
- Family: Pterophoridae
- Genus: Gillmeria
- Species: G. armeniaca

Binomial name
- Gillmeria armeniaca (Zagulajev, 1984)

Synonyms
- Platyptilia armeniaca Zagulajev, 1984; Gillmeria uralskinensis Gibeaux, 1995

Species of plume moth

Gillmeria armeniaca is a moth of the family Pterophoridae that is found in Armenia, Russia, Kazakhstan and Iran.
