= Xyroptila africana =

Scientific classification
- Kingdom: Animalia
- Phylum: Arthropoda
- Clade: Pancrustacea
- Class: Insecta
- Order: Lepidoptera
- Family: Pterophoridae
- Genus: Xyroptila
- Species: X. africana

Binomial name
- Xyroptila africana Bigot, 1969

Species of plume moth

Xyroptila africana is a moth of the family Pterophoridae. It is known from the Democratic Republic of Congo and Ghana.
