= Sphenarches bilineatus =

Scientific classification
- Kingdom: Animalia
- Phylum: Arthropoda
- Class: Insecta
- Order: Lepidoptera
- Family: Pterophoridae
- Genus: Sphenarches
- Species: S. bilineatus

Binomial name
- Sphenarches bilineatus Yano, 1963

Species of plume moth

Sphenarches bilineatus is a moth of the family Pterophoridae that is known from Samoa.

The length of the forewings is 7 millimetres (0.28 in) for males and 7.2 millimetres (0.28 in) for females.

== Exterlal links ==
- Data related to Sphenarches bilineatus at Wikispecies
