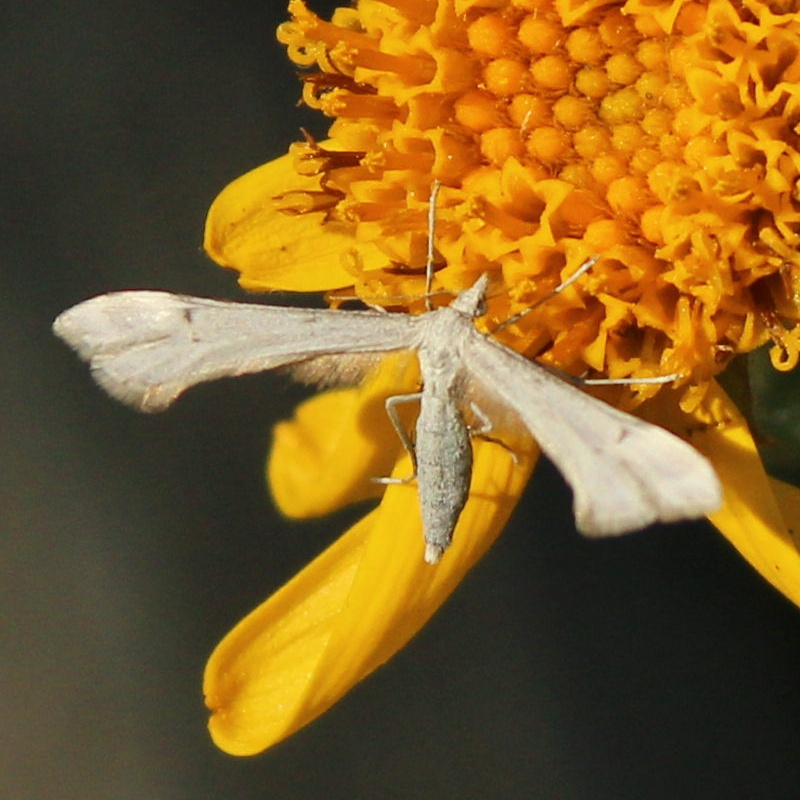

Scientific classification
- Domain: Eukaryota
- Kingdom: Animalia
- Phylum: Arthropoda
- Class: Insecta
- Order: Lepidoptera
- Family: Pterophoridae
- Genus: Gillmeria
- Species: G. albertae

Binomial name
- Gillmeria albertae (Barnes & Lindsey, 1921)

Synonyms
- Platyptilia albertae Barnes & Lindsey, 1921

= Gillmeria albertae =

Species of plume moth

Gillmeria albertae is a moth of the family Pterophoridae first described by William Barnes and Arthur Ward Lindsey in 1921. It is known from the mountains of Alberta near Banff.

The wingspan is 24–27 millimetres (0.94–1.06 in). Adults are white. The antennae are dotted above with grey brown. The forewings are white. The costa is brownish grey to the cleft, which is preceded by two dark dots. There is a third similar dot in the middle of the cell. The fringes are white. The hindwings are light brownish grey, although the fringes and third lobe are slightly paler.

Adults are on wing from mid-July to August.

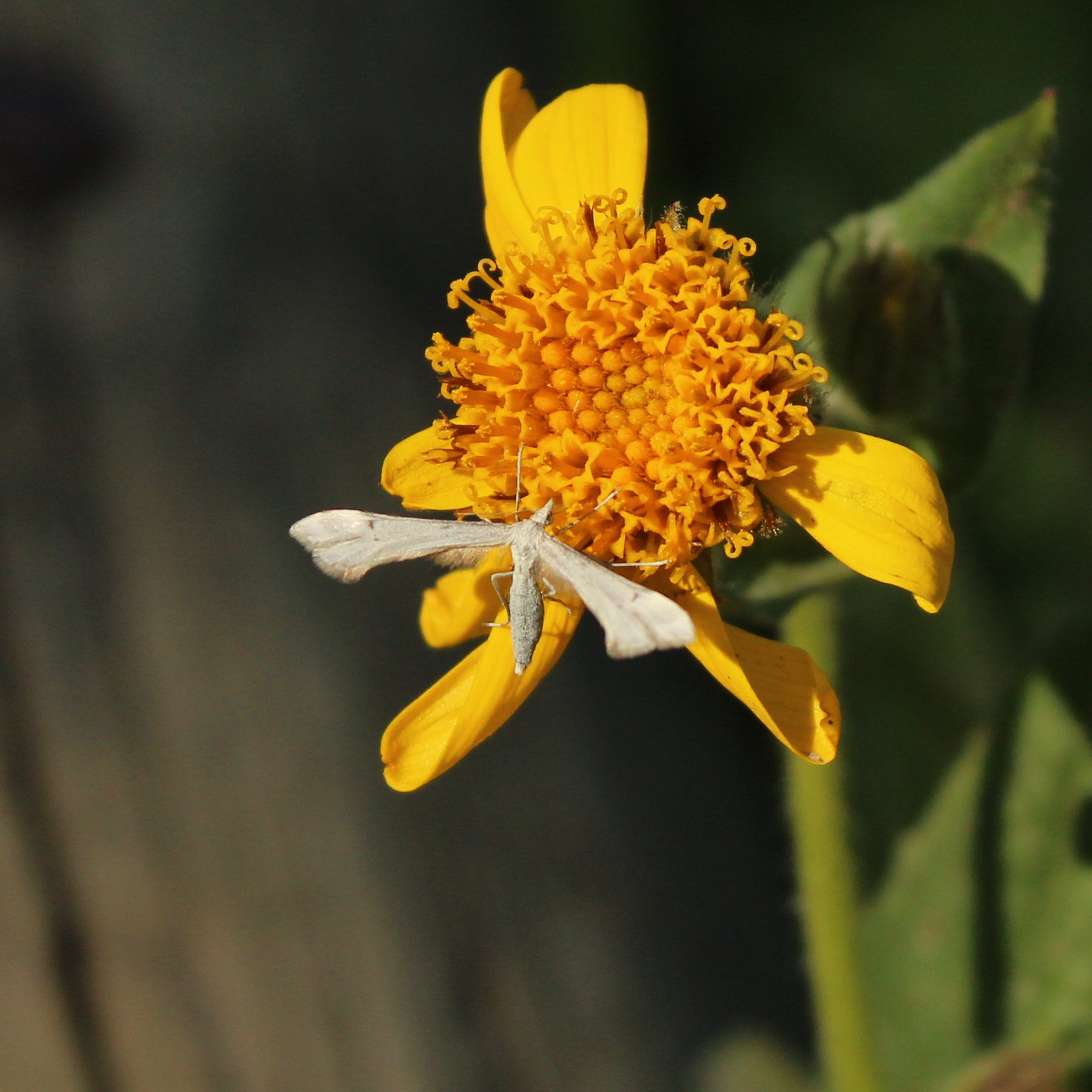
Feeding on an Arnica flower in Banff National Park
