= Xyroptila colluceo =

Scientific classification
- Kingdom: Animalia
- Phylum: Arthropoda
- Class: Insecta
- Order: Lepidoptera
- Family: Pterophoridae
- Genus: Xyroptila
- Species: X. colluceo

Binomial name
- Xyroptila colluceo Gielis & De Vos, 2007

Species of plume moth

Xyroptila colluceo is a moth of the family Pterophoridae. It is known from New Guinea.
