= Gillmeria stenoptiloides =

Scientific classification
- Kingdom: Animalia
- Phylum: Arthropoda
- Clade: Pancrustacea
- Class: Insecta
- Order: Lepidoptera
- Family: Pterophoridae
- Genus: Gillmeria
- Species: G. stenoptiloides

Binomial name
- Gillmeria stenoptiloides (Filipjev, 1927)

Synonyms
- Amblyptilia stenoptiloides Filipjev, 1927; Platyptilia stenoptiloides

Species of plume moth

Gillmeria stenoptiloides is a moth of the family Pterophoridae that is known from Japan (Honshu), north-east China, Mongolia, and Russia (where it is found in the North Ural, South Siberia, Kamchatka & Russian Far East). It was described by Ivan Nikolayevich Filipjev in 1927. A 2022 study reported the species from the North Ural, describing the record as its westernmost known occurrence.

The species has dark red-brown wings.
