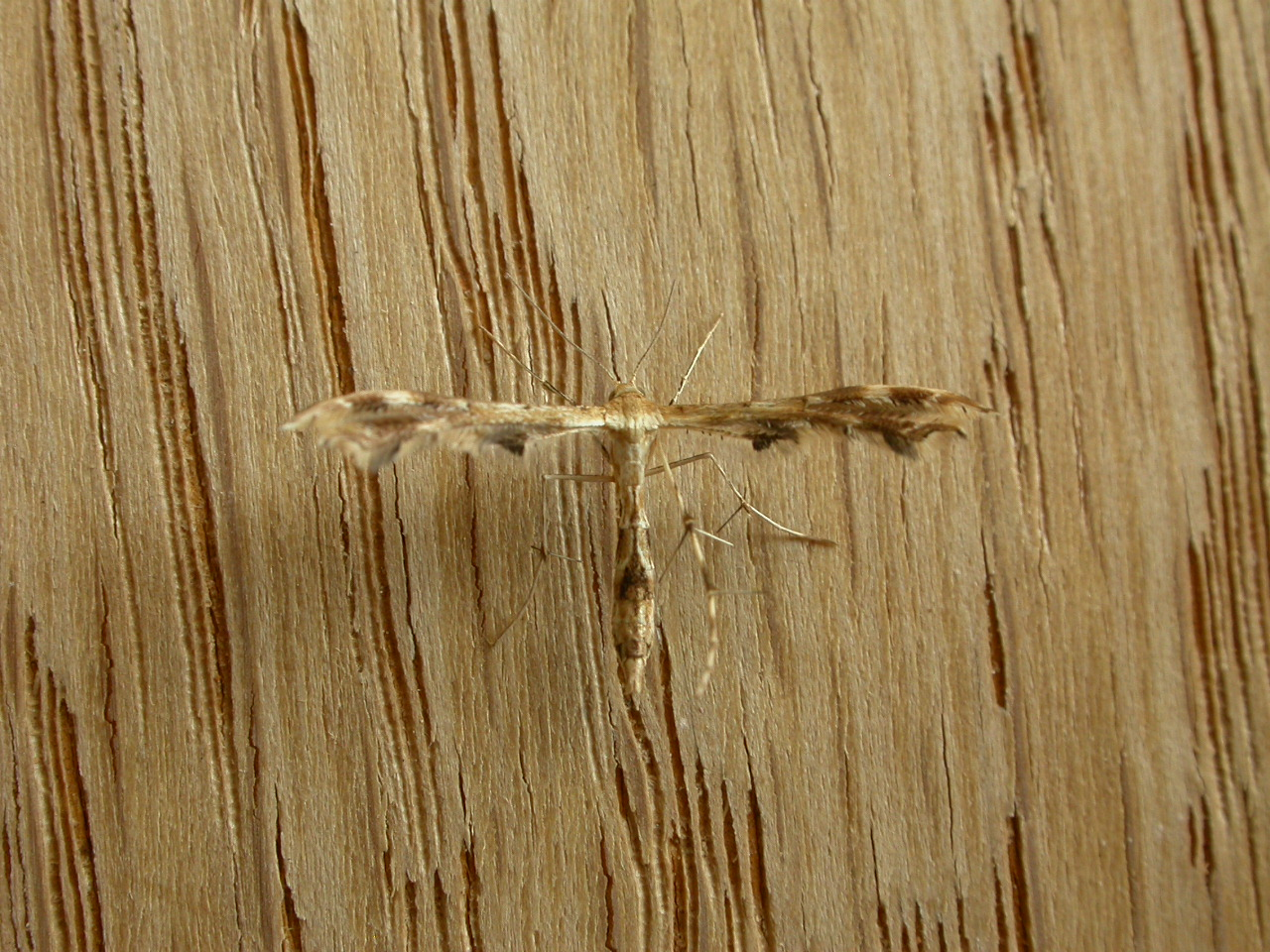
- Sphenarches anisodactylus

Scientific classification
- Kingdom: Animalia
- Phylum: Arthropoda
- Class: Insecta
- Order: Lepidoptera
- Family: Pterophoridae
- Tribe: Platyptiliini
- Genus: Sphenarches; Meyrick, 1886

Synonyms
- Sphenarctes Carus, 1887 (misspelling)

= Sphenarches =

Plume moth genus

Sphenarches is a genus of moths in the family Pterophoridae. Species in this genus are distributed in regions with pantropical climates, and are also found in Japan and southern Canada. Host plants for the genus are Dolichos lablab, Lagenaria leucantha clavata, and L. leucantha gourda.

== Species ==
- Sphenarches anisodactylus (syn: Sphenarches synophrys (type))
- Sphenarches bilineatus Yano, 1963
- Sphenarches bifurcatus
- Sphenarches caffer (Zeller, 1852)
- Sphenarches cafferoides Gibeaux, 1996
- Sphenarches nanellus
- Sphenarches ontario (McDunnough, 1927)
- Sphenarches zanclistes (Meyrick, 1905)

=== Species of doubtful validity ===
Sphenarches languidus was originally described as Oxyptilus languidus, discovered in Colombia by Felder and Rogenhofer in 1875. The species's validity is uncertain; it may be a synonym of Sphenarches nanellus. The type specimen of this species is in poor condition, and more information has not been found. Contemporary knowledge is not able to differentiate between the two species.
