= Gillmeria scutata =

Scientific classification
- Domain: Eukaryota
- Kingdom: Animalia
- Phylum: Arthropoda
- Class: Insecta
- Order: Lepidoptera
- Family: Pterophoridae
- Genus: Gillmeria
- Species: G. scutata

Binomial name
- Gillmeria scutata (Yano, 1961)

Synonyms
- Platyptilia scutata Yano, 1961

Species of plume moth

Gillmeria scutata is a moth of the family Pterophoridae that is known from the Honshu province of Japan.

The length of the forewings is 11–13 millimetres (0.43–0.51 in).
