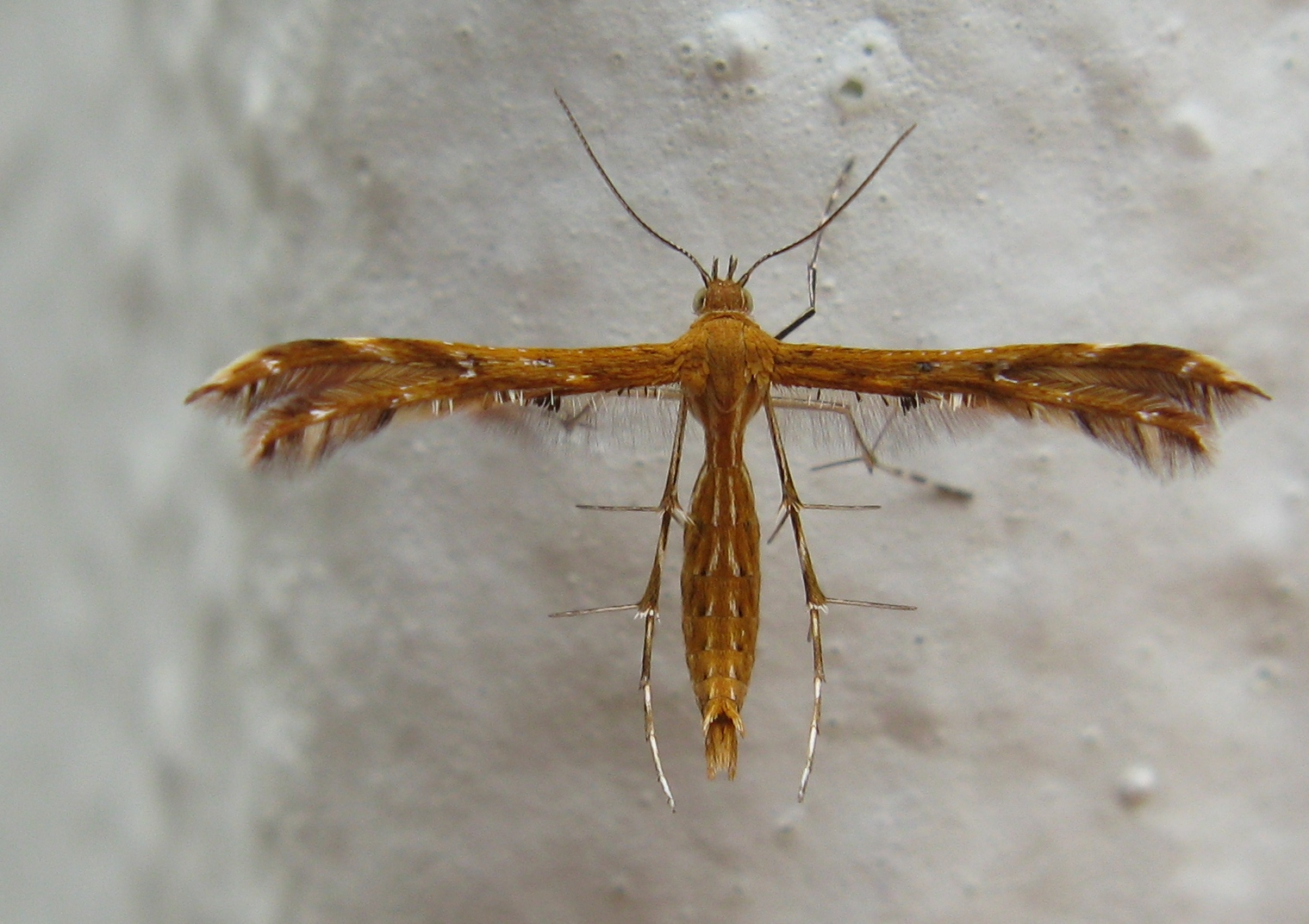

Scientific classification
- Kingdom: Animalia
- Phylum: Arthropoda
- Class: Insecta
- Order: Lepidoptera
- Family: Pterophoridae
- Genus: Stenodacma
- Species: S. wahlbergi

Binomial name
- Stenodacma wahlbergi (Zeller, 1851)

Synonyms
- Trichoptilus wahlbergi; Oxyptilus wahlbergi; Buckleria wahlbergi; Crombrugghia wahlbergi; Pterophorus wahlbergi; Pterophorus rutilalis Walker, 1864; Oxyptilus rutilans E. Wollaston, 1879; Stenodacma iranella Amsel, 1959

= Stenodacma wahlbergi =

Species of plume moth

Stenodacma wahlbergi is a moth of the family Pterophoridae described by Philipp Christoph Zeller in 1851. It is known from Japan (Honshu, Kyushu, Tsushima), China, Saudi Arabia, Iran, Sri Lanka, India, Central, East and South Africa, St. Helena, Mauritius, the Seychelles and Rodrigues. It has recently been recorded from Vietnam. Records for Australia were based on synonymisation with Stenodacma pyrrhodes.

The length of the forewings is 6–7 mm. Adults emerge from April to October in Japan.

The larvae feed on Oxalis species (including Oxalis corniculata), Ipomoea batatas and Vitaceae (Vitis indica). They feed on the leaf and pod of the host plant.
