= Gillmeria irakella =

Scientific classification
- Domain: Eukaryota
- Kingdom: Animalia
- Phylum: Arthropoda
- Class: Insecta
- Order: Lepidoptera
- Family: Pterophoridae
- Genus: Gillmeria
- Species: G. irakella

Binomial name
- Gillmeria irakella (Amsel, 1959)

Synonyms
- Platyptilia irakella Amsel, 1959

Species of plume moth

Gillmeria irakella is a moth of the family Pterophoridae that can be found in Turkey, Iraq and Iran.
