= Stenodacma richardi =

Scientific classification
- Kingdom: Animalia
- Phylum: Arthropoda
- Class: Insecta
- Order: Lepidoptera
- Family: Pterophoridae
- Genus: Stenodacma
- Species: S. richardi

Binomial name
- Stenodacma richardi Ustjuzhanin et Kovtunovich, 2010

Species of plume moth

Stenodacma richardi is a moth of the family Pterophoridae that is known from South Africa.
