= Xyroptila vaughani =

Scientific classification
- Kingdom: Animalia
- Phylum: Arthropoda
- Class: Insecta
- Order: Lepidoptera
- Family: Pterophoridae
- Genus: Xyroptila
- Species: X. vaughani

Binomial name
- Xyroptila vaughani (T. B. Fletcher, 1909)

Synonyms
- Oxyptilus vaughani T. B. Fletcher, 1909

Species of plume moth

Xyroptila vaughani is a moth of the family Pterophoridae. The species was described by Thomas Bainbrigge Fletcher in 1909. It is found in Sri Lanka and India.

The larvae probably feed on the fruit of Dimorphocalyx glabellus.
