= Sphenarches bifurcatus =

Scientific classification
- Kingdom: Animalia
- Phylum: Arthropoda
- Class: Insecta
- Order: Lepidoptera
- Family: Pterophoridae
- Genus: Sphenarches
- Species: S. bifurcatus

Binomial name
- Sphenarches bifurcatus Gielis, 2009

Species of plume moth

Sphenarches bifurcatus is a moth of the family Pterophoridae that can be found in the Democratic Republic of the Congo (Haut-Katanga).
