= Sphenarches cafferoides =

Scientific classification
- Kingdom: Animalia
- Phylum: Arthropoda
- Clade: Pancrustacea
- Class: Insecta
- Order: Lepidoptera
- Family: Pterophoridae
- Genus: Sphenarches
- Species: S. cafferoides

Binomial name
- Sphenarches cafferoides Gibeaux, 1996

Species of plume moth

Sphenarches cafferoides is a moth of the family Pterophoridae that is known from Madagascar.
