= Gillmeria macrornis =

Scientific classification
- Kingdom: Animalia
- Phylum: Arthropoda
- Class: Insecta
- Order: Lepidoptera
- Family: Pterophoridae
- Genus: Gillmeria
- Species: G. macrornis

Binomial name
- Gillmeria macrornis (Meyrick, 1930)

Synonyms
- Platyptilia macrornis Meyrick, 1930; Platyptilia kerzhneri Zagulajev & Penischukowskaja, 1972

Species of plume moth

Gillmeria macrornis is a moth species of the family Pterophoridae. It is known from Russia and China.
