= Xyroptila aenea =

Scientific classification
- Kingdom: Animalia
- Phylum: Arthropoda
- Clade: Pancrustacea
- Class: Insecta
- Order: Lepidoptera
- Family: Pterophoridae
- Genus: Xyroptila
- Species: X. aenea

Binomial name
- Xyroptila aenea Kovtunovich & Ustjuzhanin, 2006

Species of plume moth

Xyroptila aenea is a moth of the family Pterophoridae and is endemic to Ambon Island.
