= Xyroptila siami =

Scientific classification
- Kingdom: Animalia
- Phylum: Arthropoda
- Clade: Pancrustacea
- Class: Insecta
- Order: Lepidoptera
- Family: Pterophoridae
- Genus: Xyroptila
- Species: X. siami

Binomial name
- Xyroptila siami Kovtunovich & Ustjuzhanin, 2006

Species of plume moth

Xyroptila siami is a moth of the family Pterophoridae which can be found in Thailand and China.

The wingspan is about 13 millimetres (0.51 in).
