= Xyroptila =

Scientific classification
- Kingdom: Animalia
- Phylum: Arthropoda
- Class: Insecta
- Order: Lepidoptera
- Family: Pterophoridae
- Subfamily: Pterophorinae
- Tribe: Platyptiliini
- Genus: Xyroptila; Meyrick, 1908

Synonyms
- Pseudoxyroptila Hori, 1933; Xyroptilia Bigot, 1969 (misspelling)

Plume moth genus

Xyroptila is a genus of moths in the family Pterophoridae.

== Species ==
- Xyroptila aenea
- Xyroptila africana
- Xyroptila caminites
- Xyroptila colluceo
- Xyroptila dohertyi
- Xyroptila elegans
- Xyroptila falciformis
- Xyroptila fulbae
- Xyroptila irina
- Xyroptila kuranda
- Xyroptila maklaia
- Xyroptila marmarias
- Xyroptila masaia
- Xyroptila monomotapa
- Xyroptila naiwasha
- Xyroptila oenophanes
- Xyroptila oksana
- Xyroptila peltastes
- Xyroptila ruvenzori
- Xyroptila siami
- Xyroptila soma
- Xyroptila sybylla
- Xyroptila uluru
- Xyroptila variegata
- Xyroptila vaughani
- Xyroptila zambesi
