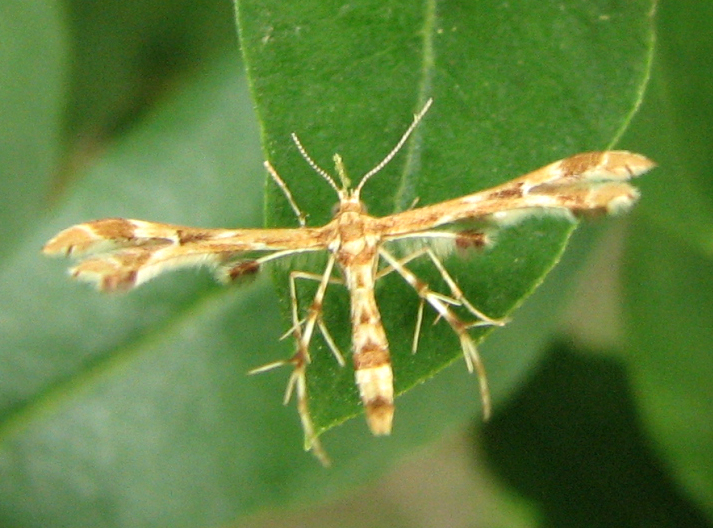

Scientific classification
- Kingdom: Animalia
- Phylum: Arthropoda
- Class: Insecta
- Order: Lepidoptera
- Family: Pterophoridae
- Genus: Sphenarches
- Species: S. ontario

Binomial name
- Sphenarches ontario (McDunnough, 1927)

Synonyms
- Pterophorus ontario McDunnough, 1927

= Sphenarches ontario =

Species of plume moth

Sphenarches ontario is a moth of the family Pterophoridae that is known from Ontario, Canada.

The wingspan is about 14 millimetres (0.55 in).

The larvae feed on the inflorescences of certain grape species.
