= Xyroptila soma =

Scientific classification
- Kingdom: Animalia
- Phylum: Arthropoda
- Clade: Pancrustacea
- Class: Insecta
- Order: Lepidoptera
- Family: Pterophoridae
- Genus: Xyroptila
- Species: X. soma

Binomial name
- Xyroptila soma Kovtunovich & Ustjuzhanin, 2006

Species of plume moth

Xyroptila soma is a moth of the family Pterophoridae. It is found in India (northern Kanara).
