= Sphenarches nanellus =

Scientific classification
- Kingdom: Animalia
- Phylum: Arthropoda
- Class: Insecta
- Order: Lepidoptera
- Family: Pterophoridae
- Genus: Sphenarches
- Species: S. nanellus

Binomial name
- Sphenarches nanellus (Walker, 1864)

Synonyms
- Oxyptilus nanellus Walker, 1864

Species of plume moth

Sphenarches nanellus is a species of moth in the genus Sphenarches known from Brazil and Peru. The host plant for the species is Eupatorium betonicaeforme. Moths of this species take flight in March, May, and December and have a wingspan of approximately 9–11 millimetres (0.35–0.43 in).
