= Gillmeria melanoschista =

Scientific classification
- Kingdom: Animalia
- Phylum: Arthropoda
- Class: Insecta
- Order: Lepidoptera
- Family: Pterophoridae
- Genus: Gillmeria
- Species: G. melanoschista

Binomial name
- Gillmeria melanoschista (T. B. Fletcher, 1940)

Synonyms
- Platyptilia melanoschista T. B. Fletcher, 1940; Platyptilia alexandri Ustjuzhanin, 1996

Species of plume moth

Gillmeria melanoschista is a moth of the family Pterophoridae described by Thomas Bainbrigge Fletcher in 1940. It is found in Russia (eastern Siberia and the Kuril Islands) and Japan.

== Misidentification ==
A taxon that was once believed to exist was classified as Platypilla ussuriensis before being reclassified as Gillmeria ussuriensis, however, it was discovered to be a misidentification of specimens that actually belonged to Gillmeria melanoschista.
