= Sphenarches caffer =

Scientific classification
- Kingdom: Animalia
- Phylum: Arthropoda
- Clade: Pancrustacea
- Class: Insecta
- Order: Lepidoptera
- Family: Pterophoridae
- Genus: Sphenarches
- Species: S. caffer

Binomial name
- Sphenarches caffer (Zeller, 1852)

Synonyms
- Oxyptilus caffer Zeller, 1852; Oxyptilus walkeri Walsingham, 1881

Species of plume moth

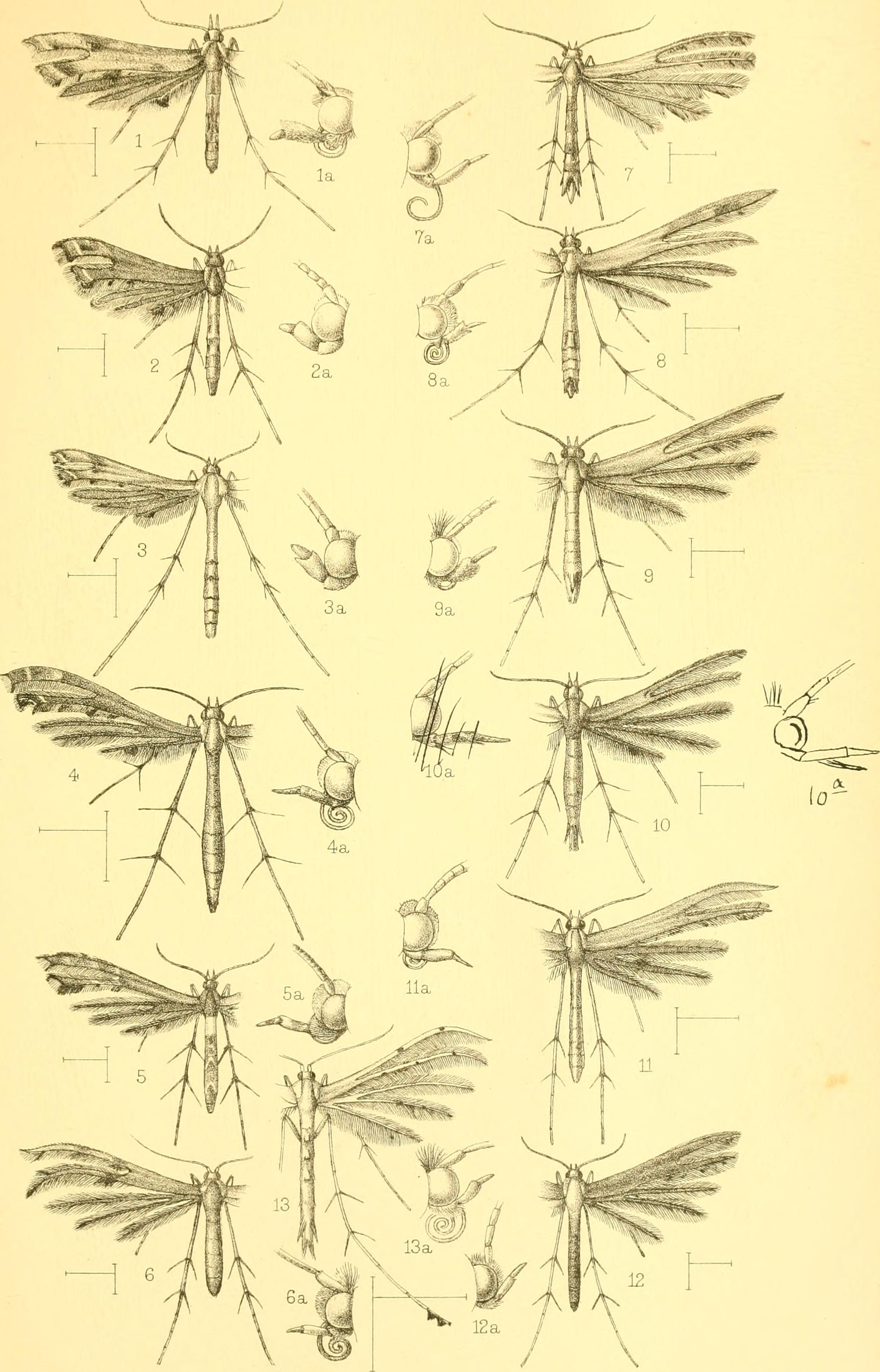
Sketch of Sphenarches caffer, (Fig 10) and other moths (c 1870)

Sphenarches caffer, the bottle gourd plume moth, is a moth of the family Pterophoridae. It is known from India, Malaysia, Mauritius, the Seychelles and South Africa.

The larvae feed on the leaves, flowers and fruits of various plants, including sweet potato. They are small, cylindrical and yellowish green with short spines all over their bodies.
