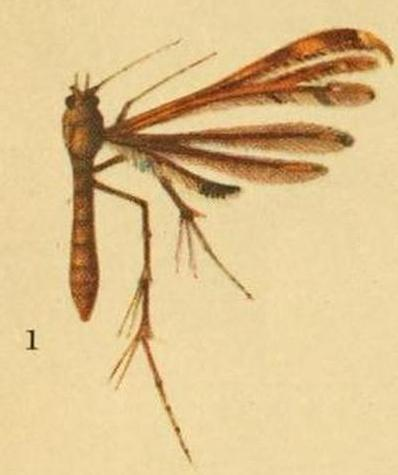
- Hexadactilia trilobata

Scientific classification
- Kingdom: Animalia
- Phylum: Arthropoda
- Class: Insecta
- Order: Lepidoptera
- Family: Pterophoridae
- Genus: Hexadactilia; T. B. Fletcher, 1910

= Hexadactilia =

Plume moth genus

Hexadactilia is a genus of moths in the family Pterophoridae. The genus was described by Thomas Bainbrigge Fletcher in 1910.

== Species ==
As of version 1.1.23.125, the Catalogue of the Pterophoroidea of the World lists the following species for genus Hexadactilia:

- Hexadactilia borneoensis Arenberger, 1995
- Hexadactilia civilis Meyrick, 1921
- Hexadactilia trilobata T. B. Fletcher, 1910
