= Hexadactilia borneoensis =

Scientific classification
- Kingdom: Animalia
- Phylum: Arthropoda
- Class: Insecta
- Order: Lepidoptera
- Family: Pterophoridae
- Genus: Hexadactilia
- Species: H. borneoensis

Binomial name
- Hexadactilia borneoensis Arenberger, 1995

Species of plume moth

Hexadactilia borneoensis is a moth of the family Pterophoridae. It was described by Ernst Arenberger in 1995 and is only known from Sabah, Borneo.
