= Xyroptila sybylla =

Scientific classification
- Kingdom: Animalia
- Phylum: Arthropoda
- Clade: Pancrustacea
- Class: Insecta
- Order: Lepidoptera
- Family: Pterophoridae
- Genus: Xyroptila
- Species: X. sybylla

Binomial name
- Xyroptila sybylla Kovtunovich & Ustjuzhanin, 2006

Species of plume moth

Xyroptila sybylla is a moth of the family Pterophoridae. It is found in Peru (Cuzco).
