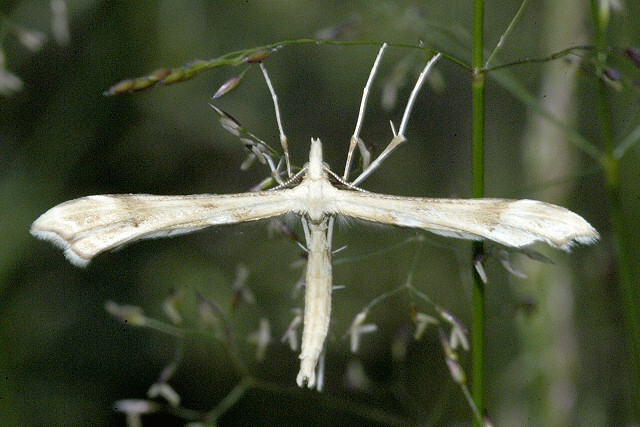

Scientific classification
- Domain: Eukaryota
- Kingdom: Animalia
- Phylum: Arthropoda
- Class: Insecta
- Order: Lepidoptera
- Family: Pterophoridae
- Genus: Gillmeria
- Species: G. ochrodactyla

Binomial name
- Gillmeria ochrodactyla Denis & Schiffermüller, 1775

Synonyms
- List: Platyptilia ochrodactyla; Alucita tetradactyla Linnaeus, 1758; Alucita ochrodactyla Denis & Schiffermüller, 1775; Platyptilus dichrodactylus Mühlig, 1863; Platyptilia ochrodactyla var. borgmanni Roessler, 1881; Platyptilia ochrodactyla var. bosniaca Rebel, 1904; Platyptilia pallida Dufrane, 1949; Gillmeria tetradactyla

= Gillmeria ochrodactyla =

Species of plume moth

Gillmeria ochrodactyla is a moth of the family Pterophoridae found in Asia and Europe. It was first described by the Austrian entomologists, Michael Denis & Ignaz Schiffermüller in 1775.

== Description ==
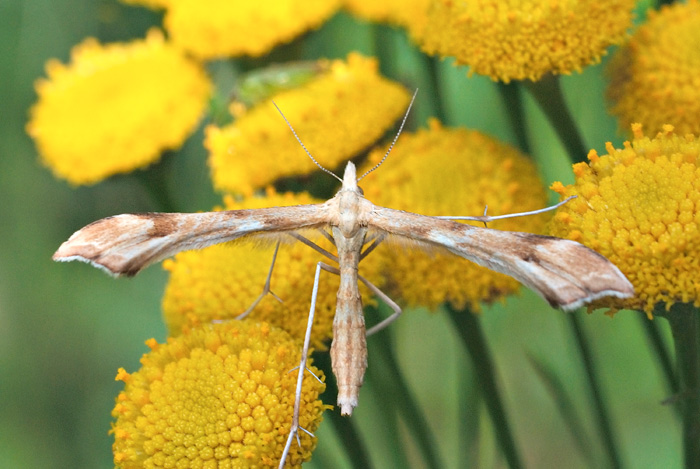

The species was known as Gillmeria tetradactyla until recently, but is now known as Gillmeria ochrodactyla. Gillmeria tetradactyla is now an invalid name. Reason for this decision is to eliminate the confusion with Platyptilia tetradactyla.

Gillmeria ochrodactyla has a wingspan of 24–28 millimetres (0.94–1.10 in) and is superficially similar to Gillmeria pallidactyla. G. ochrodactyla has brown and white bands on its hindlegs below the middle spurs, whereas the legs of G pallidactyla are not banded. The moth is single-brooded, flying from late June to August, can be found resting on the flower-heads of the larval food plant, tansy (Tanacetum vulgare). After dark, the imago will come to light.

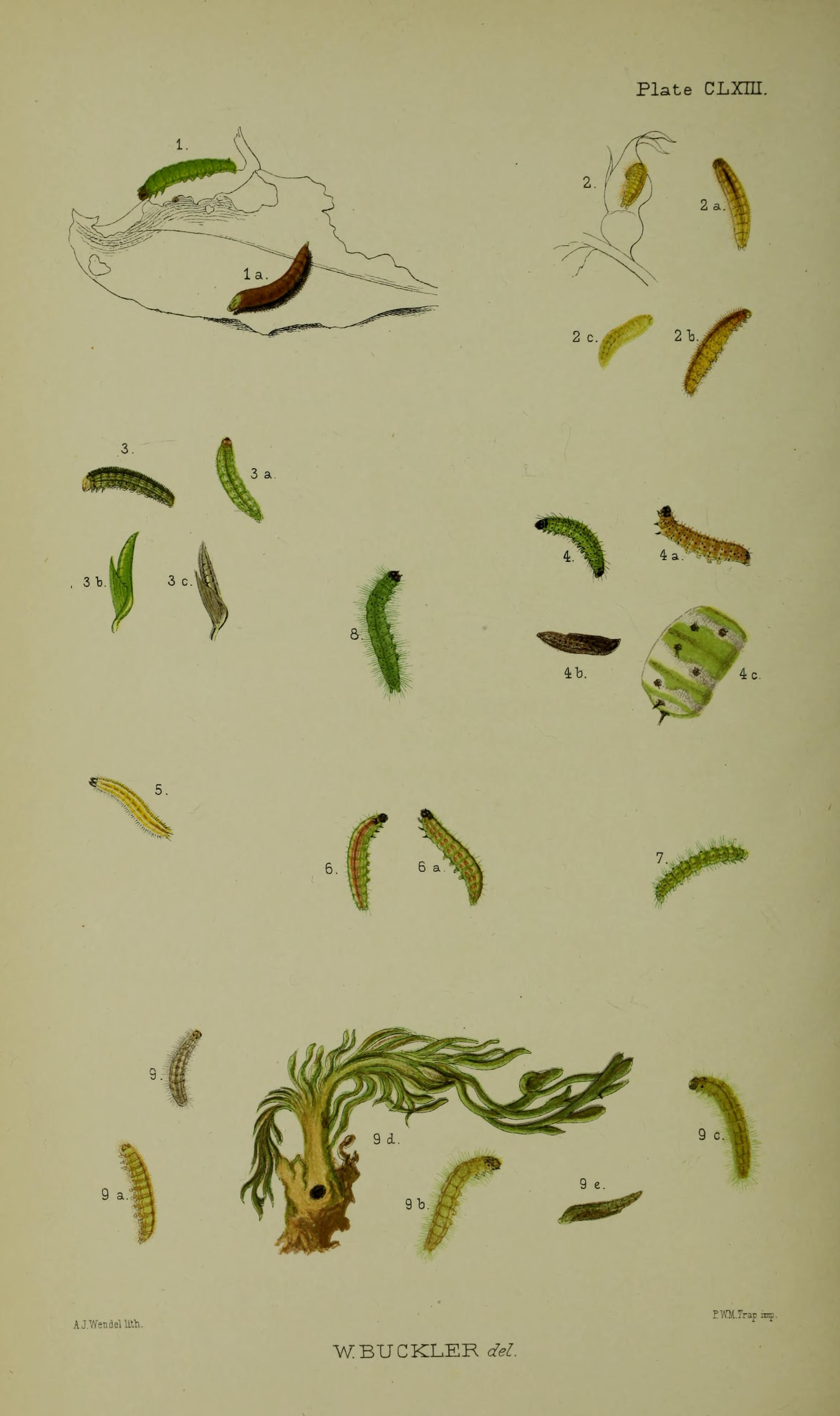
Figs 3, 3a, larva after final moult, 3c pupa

The larvae initially feed on tansy (Tanacetum vulgare) flowers in August, then mine down a shoot, and from November to March, diapause in the roots. In April the larvae eat in to a new-growth stem mining for about 2 cm, moves to a fresh position in the stem, or to a new stem to continue mining until early June. Larvae can be found by searching for wilted stems, or for frass under leaf sheafs. G. pallidactyla larvae have been found on tansy but the mature larvae feed externally on the stem, rather than mining the stem.

== Distribution ==
It is found in most of Europe and has recently been recorded from Iran and Tajikistan.
