= Xyroptila caminites =

Scientific classification
- Kingdom: Animalia
- Phylum: Arthropoda
- Class: Insecta
- Order: Lepidoptera
- Family: Pterophoridae
- Genus: Xyroptila
- Species: X. caminites

Binomial name
- Xyroptila caminites (Meyrick, 1907)

Synonyms
- Oxyptilis caminites Meyrick, 1907

Species of plume moth

Xyroptila caminites is a moth of the family Pterophoridae. It was described by Edward Meyrick in 1907 and is found in Assam, India.
