= Gillmeria rhusiodactyla =

Scientific classification
- Kingdom: Animalia
- Phylum: Arthropoda
- Class: Insecta
- Order: Lepidoptera
- Family: Pterophoridae
- Genus: Gillmeria
- Species: G. rhusiodactyla

Binomial name
- Gillmeria rhusiodactyla (Fuchs, 1903)

Synonyms
- Platyptilia rhusiodactyla Fuchs, 1903

Species of plume moth

Gillmeria rhusiodactyla is a moth of the family Pterophoridae with a type locality in Armenia.

Distribution areas are Armenia, Azerbaijan, southern part of European Russia, western Kazakhstan.

The wingspan is 9–11 millimetres (0.35–0.43 in).
