= Sinpunctiptilia tasmaniae =

Scientific classification
- Kingdom: Animalia
- Phylum: Arthropoda
- Clade: Pancrustacea
- Class: Insecta
- Order: Lepidoptera
- Family: Pterophoridae
- Genus: Sinpunctiptilia
- Species: S. tasmaniae

Binomial name
- Sinpunctiptilia tasmaniae Arenberger, 2006

Species of plume moth

Sinpunctiptilia tasmaniae is a moth of the family Pterophoridae. It is found in Tasmania.

Sinpunctiptilia tasmaniae was separated from Sinpunctiptilia emissalis by Ernst Arenberger in 2006.
