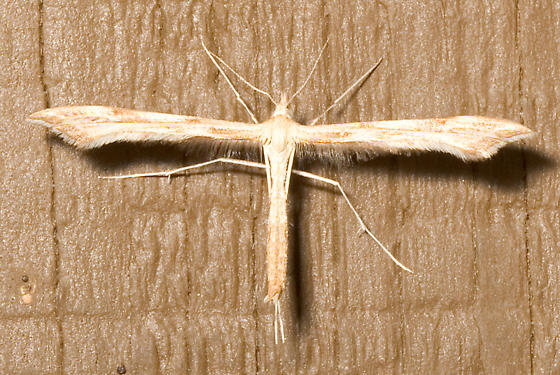

Scientific classification
- Domain: Eukaryota
- Kingdom: Animalia
- Phylum: Arthropoda
- Class: Insecta
- Order: Lepidoptera
- Family: Pterophoridae
- Genus: Gillmeria
- Species: G. pallidactyla

Binomial name
- Gillmeria pallidactyla (Haworth, 1811)

Synonyms
- List: Alucita pallidactyla Haworth, 1811; Platyptilia pallidactyla (Haworth, 1811); Pterophorus migadactylus Curtis, 1827; Alucita ochrodactyla Treitschke, 1833; Pterophorus marginidactylus Fitch, 1854; Pterophorus nebulaedactylus Fitch, 1854; Platyptilus bertrami Rössler, 1864; Platyptilus bischoffi Zeller, 1867; Pterophorus cervinidactylus Packard, 1873; Platyptilus adustus Walsingham, 1880; Platyptilia sachalinensis Matsumura, 1911; Platyptilia pallidiola Matsumura, 1931; Platyptilia chapmani Tutt, 1896

= Gillmeria pallidactyla =

Species of plume moth

Gillmeria pallidactyla is a moth of the family Pterophoridae first described by the English entomologist, Adrian Hardy Haworth in 1811. It has a Holarctic distribution and is widespread throughout North America and the Palearctic.

== Description ==
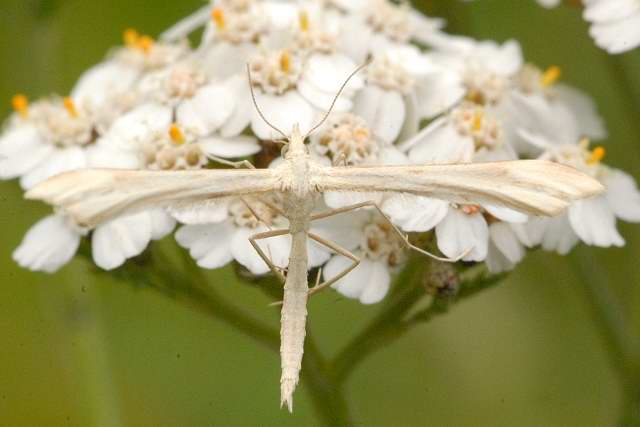

The wingspan is 23–27 millimetres (0.91–1.06 in). The frontal tuft and palpi are very long The posterior tibiae below the middle -spurs are wholly light brown. The ferruginous-ochreous, clouded with yellow-whitish forewings have a subfalcate apex. The costal edge is dark fuscous; a darker triangular suffusion on costa beyond middle apex forms a darker dot, and this is followed by a whitish costal spot and an ochreous-whitish subterminal line.The apical 2/3 of the terminal cilia is white. The hindwings are dark ochreous-fuscous with a small scale-tooth in the middle. The larva is green with the dorsal line darker or somewhat brownish-tinged; subdorsal and lateral grey-whitish. Th subspiracular is white and the head whitish -yellowish

== Biology ==
Adults are on wing from June to July in Europe and from June to August in northern North America. They hide amongst low foliage during the day. They become active from dusk onwards.

The larvae bore into the stem in the autumn and overwinter in the roots. In the spring they feed on a succession of shoots causing them to wilt. They mainly feed on Achillea species including sneezewort (Achillea ptarmica) and yarrow (Achillea millefolium), but rarely also on tansy (Tanacetum vulgare) and Tanacetum corymbosum.

== Similar species ==
This species is superficially similar to Gillmeria ochrodactyla which has brown and white bands on its hindlegs below the middle spurs, whereas the legs of G pallidactyla are not banded.
