= Stenodacma cognata =

Scientific classification
- Kingdom: Animalia
- Phylum: Arthropoda
- Class: Insecta
- Order: Lepidoptera
- Family: Pterophoridae
- Genus: Stenodacma
- Species: S. cognata

Binomial name
- Stenodacma cognata Gielis, 2009

Species of plume moth

Stenodacma cognata is a moth of the family Pterophoridae that is found in the Democratic Republic of the Congo (Haut-Katanga).
