= Stenoptilia phaeonephes =

Scientific classification
- Kingdom: Animalia
- Phylum: Arthropoda
- Clade: Pancrustacea
- Class: Insecta
- Order: Lepidoptera
- Family: Pterophoridae
- Genus: Stenoptilodes
- Species: S. phaeonephes

Binomial name
- Stenoptilodes phaeonephes (Meyrick, 1886)

Synonyms
- Mimeseoptilus phaeonephes Meyrick, 1886

Species of plume moth

Stenoptilodes phaeonephes is a moth of the family Pterophoridae. It is found in Australia, including Tasmania.

The wingspan is about 10 mm.
