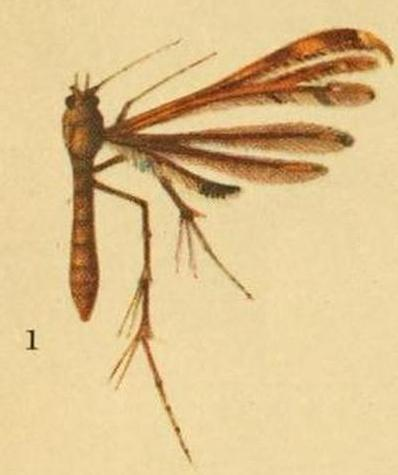

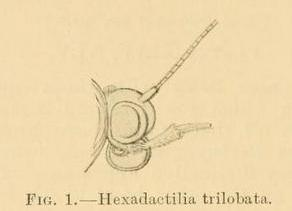

Scientific classification
- Domain: Eukaryota
- Kingdom: Animalia
- Phylum: Arthropoda
- Class: Insecta
- Order: Lepidoptera
- Family: Pterophoridae
- Genus: Hexadactilia
- Species: H. trilobata

Binomial name
- Hexadactilia trilobata T. B. Fletcher, 1910

= Hexadactilia trilobata =

Species of plume moth

Hexadactilia trilobata is a moth of the family Pterophoridae described by Thomas Bainbrigge Fletcher in 1910. It is found in Australia in Queensland and New Guinea.

== Original description ==
(wingspan male 15 mm) Labial palpi long, semi-erect; second joint slightly dilated apically, light fuscous annulated with darker; third joint rather over half-length of second, smoothly scaled, dark-fuscous. Antennae dark-fuscous, dotted with whitish above. Head and thorax tawny-fuscous. Abdomen long and slender, tawny-fuscous, suffused with dark-fuscous; fourth segment with paler /\ markings, posterior segments margined with whitish. Foreleg dark-fuscous: tibia short, dilated by a tuft of blackish scales banded and tipped with white; tarsus narrowly banded with white at joints. Midleg long, slender, tawny-fuscous: tibia with scale-tufts at 3/5 and apex, the latter tuft emitting a pair of long spurs. Hindleg long and slender, tawny-fuscous, irrorated above with dark-fuscous: tibia with pale scale-tufts at 1/3, 2/3 and apex, second and third tufts each emitting a pair of long slender blackish-tipped spurs; tarsal joints slightly thickened with scales apically. Forewing long, slender, cleft from about 1/2, second segment again cleft from about 2/5 of its length; first segment very narrow, cleft wide and conspicuous; subsegments linear, first subsegment parallel to first segment, divergent from second subsegment: pale tawny-fuscous, suffused with fuscous: base of cleft preceded and edged by a longitudinal blackish discal spot; first segment with central third pale-tawny, cut at 3/4 by a narrow transverse white line, area beyond this pale-tawny; second segment pale-tawny at base of second cleft; subsegments cut at 2/3 of their length by a narrow white line, area beyond this paler. Cilia on costa fuscous-brown, pale-ochreous opposite paler areas, a whitish subapical dot; on hinder-margin of first segment whitish-ochreous mixed with a few whitish hairs and scattered black scales, on third fourth blackish, on outer fourth whitish-ochreous; on fore-margin of second segment pale-ochreous, blackish on central third of segment; on hinder-margin of first subsegment whitish-ochreous with a few scattered black scales; on fore- margin of second subsegmeut whitish-ochreous on first fourth of segment, beyond 1/4 pale-fuscous with a few scattered black scales; on dorsum ochreous-whitish beneath bases of both clefts, otherwise blackish, with minute black scale-tufts at 2/3 and apex. Hindwing cleft from within 1/3 and from near base, segments very slender and linear; dark-fuscous. Cilia dark-fuscous, third segment on both margins with a large black apical scale-tooth and a few scattered black scales between this and base. TYPE Female (No. 41944) in Walsingham Coll., and Co-type (No. 8527) in Bainbrigge Fletcher Coll.; both from Ron, New Guinea, in July 1897 (Doherty). A third example in Lord Walsingham's collection was collected by Doherty at Humboldt Bay, Northern New Guinea, in April 1893.

— Original description by T. B. Fletcher
