= Xyroptila peltastes =

Scientific classification
- Kingdom: Animalia
- Phylum: Arthropoda
- Class: Insecta
- Order: Lepidoptera
- Family: Pterophoridae
- Genus: Xyroptila
- Species: X. peltastes

Binomial name
- Xyroptila peltastes (Meyrick, 1908)

Synonyms
- Oxyptilus peltastes Meyrick, 1908

Species of plume moth

Xyroptila peltastes is a moth of the family Pterophoridae. It is found in Australia.

== Original description ==
(wingspan male 12–13 mm) Head and thorax ferruginous-brown mixed with dark fuscous, sometimes pale-sprinkled, metathorax pale yellow. Palpi sickle-shaped, acute, ferruginous, terminal joint and apex of second somewhat whitish-sprinkled, anterior edge blackish. Antennae blackish, whitish-sprinkled. Abdomen deep chestnut-bronze-brown, basal segment and apical margin of second and third whitish, fourth segment with two pale or whitish dorsal patches. Legs golden-bronze, spurs and tarsi suffused with dark fuscous, posterior tibiae with whorls of dark fuscous spines near base and on origin of spurs. Fore-wings cleft from 3/5, first segment rather narrow, second posteriorly dilated, its apex produced, termen concave, oblique; deep chestnut-brown, thinly sprinkled throughout with white; costal edge dark fuscous; whitish-ochreous dots or small spots on first segment at base and on costa before its middle and towards apex: cilia ochreous-whitish, with blackish patches at angles of both segments, black bars on dorsum at middle and 3/4, and some grey suffusion towards base of cleft. Hind-wings cleft firstly from 2/5, secondly from near base, segments linear; dark fuscous, towards base and on third segment suffused with ferruginous; cilia light yellowish, suffused with grey towards apex of first two segments, third segment with a small black apical scale-tuft. Queensland (Cairns), in October (Dodd); four specimens.

— Original description by Edward Meyrick
