= Xyroptila uluru =

Scientific classification
- Kingdom: Animalia
- Phylum: Arthropoda
- Clade: Pancrustacea
- Class: Insecta
- Order: Lepidoptera
- Family: Pterophoridae
- Genus: Xyroptila
- Species: X. uluru

Binomial name
- Xyroptila uluru Kovtunovich & Ustjuzhanin, 2006

Species of plume moth

Xyroptila uluru is a moth of the family Pterophoridae. It is found in western Australia.
