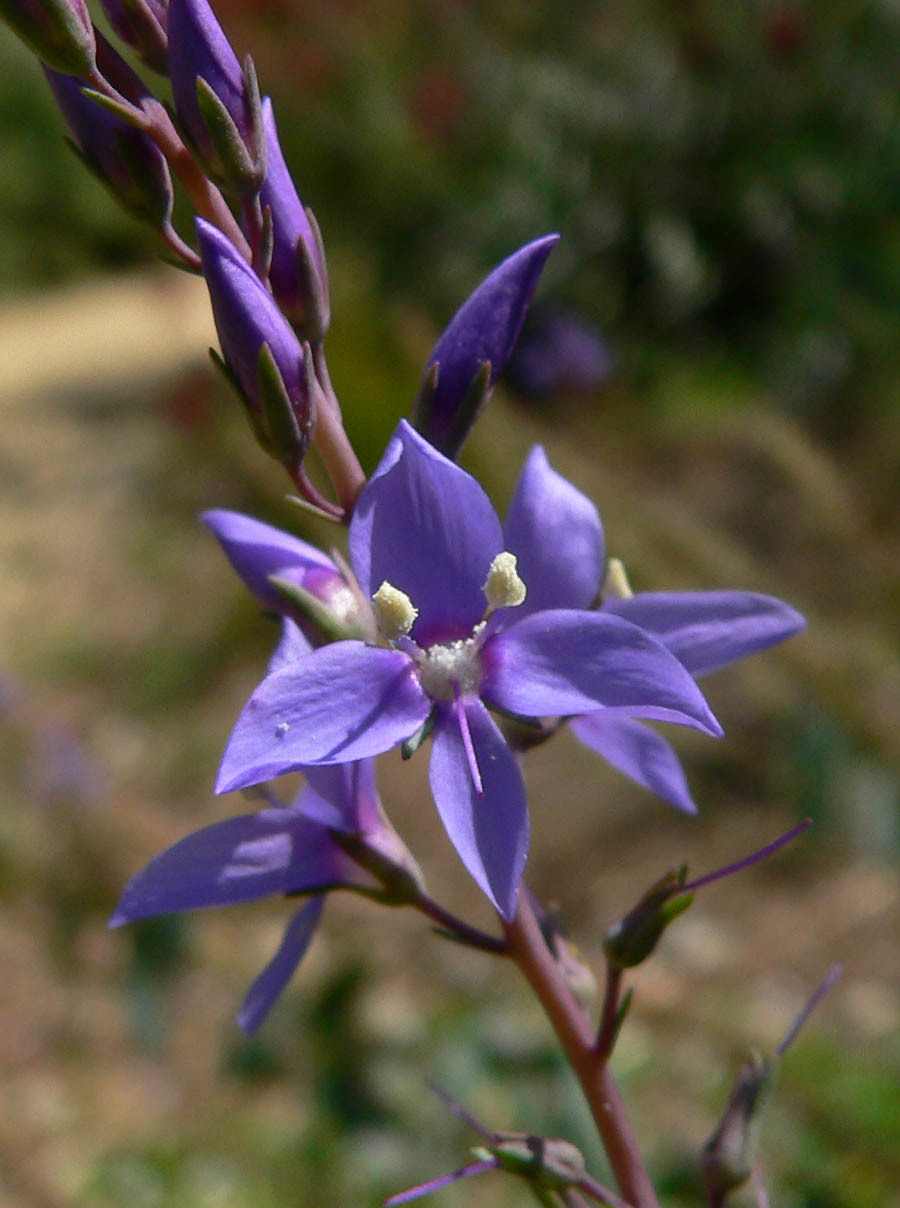

Scientific classification
- Kingdom: Plantae
- Clade: Tracheophytes
- Clade: Angiosperms
- Clade: Eudicots
- Clade: Asterids
- Order: Lamiales
- Family: Plantaginaceae
- Genus: Veronica
- Species: V. perfoliata

Binomial name
- Veronica perfoliata R.Br.
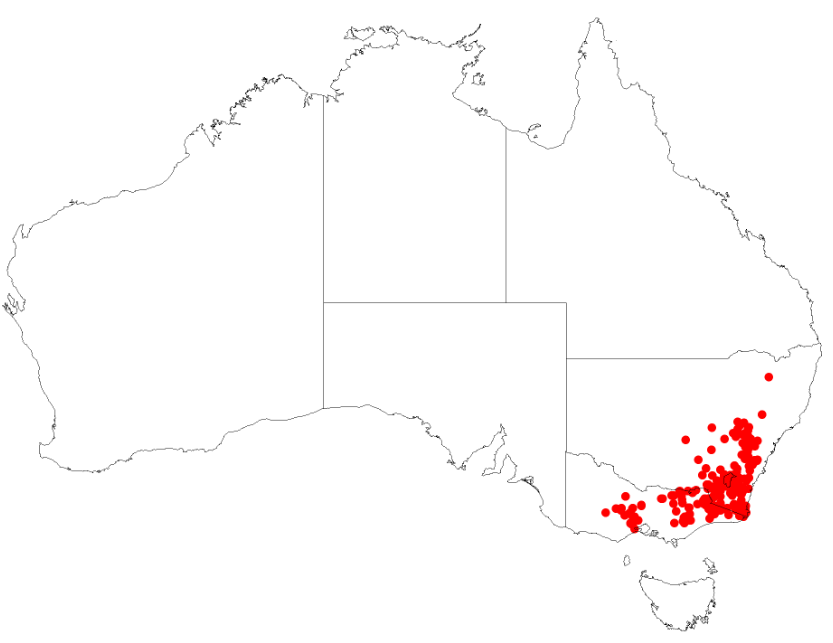
- Occurrence data from Australasian Virtual Herbarium

Synonyms
- Derwentia perfoliata (R.Br.) Raf.; Parahebe perfoliata (R.Br.) B.G.Briggs & Ehrend.; Veronica imperfoliata Benth.

= Veronica perfoliata =

Digger's speedwell

Species of flowering plant in the plantain family

Veronica perfoliata, commonly known as digger's speedwell, is a common perennial herb found at higher altitudes in south-eastern Australia. It is a low-growing multi-stemmed plant rising from a woody rootstock. It has rounded blue-grey foliage and sprays of intense violet-blue flowers at the end of arching branches. It is occasionally cultivated as a garden plant.

== Description ==
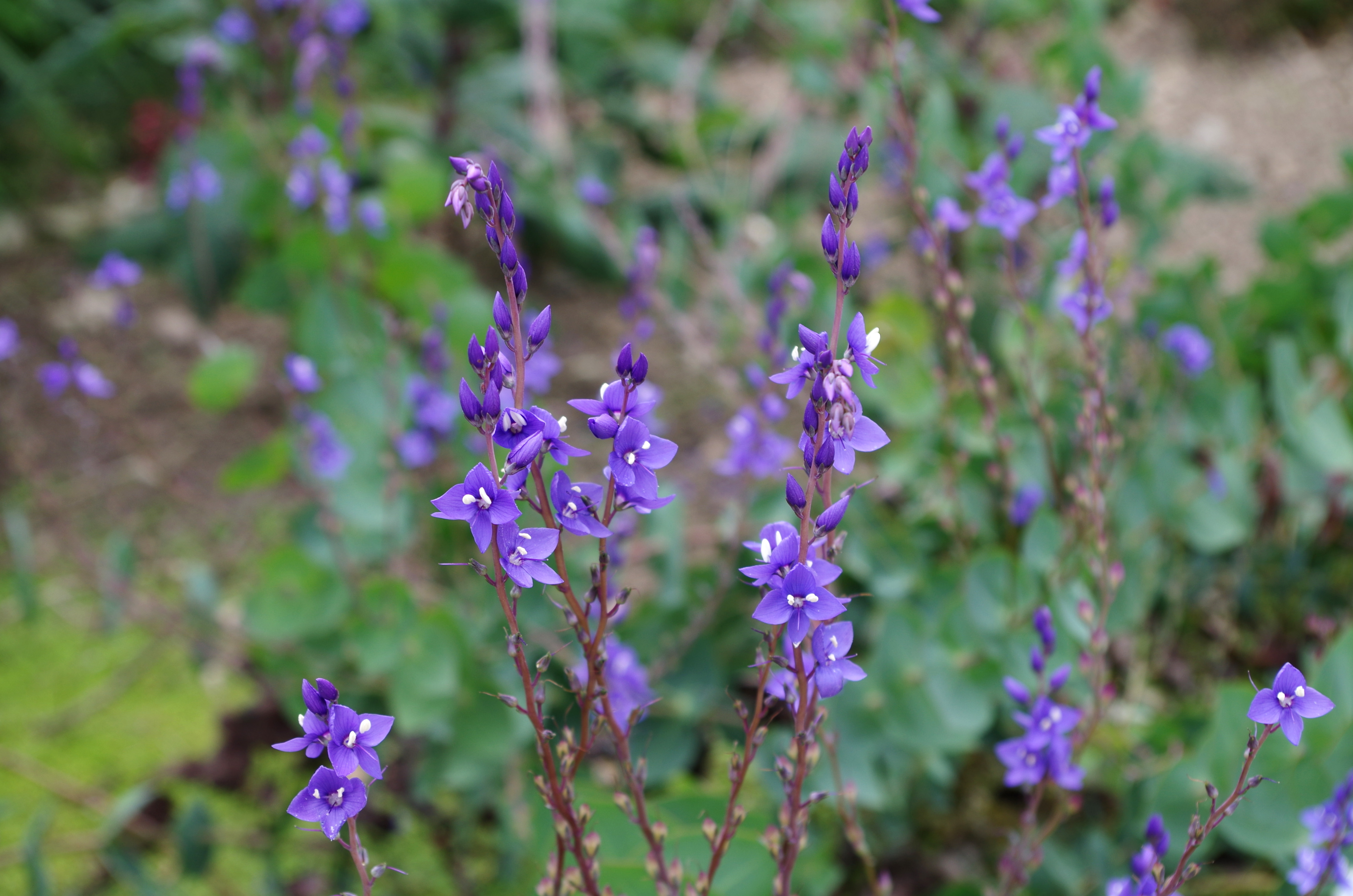
Flowers

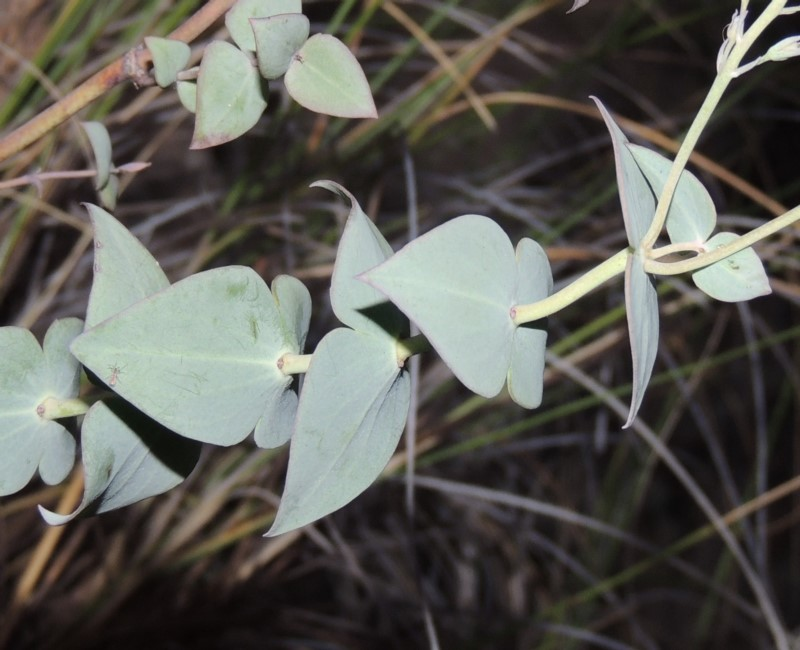
Foliage

Veronica perfoliata is an erect woody herb with arching decumbent branches 120 cm (47 in) long. The leaves are smooth and bluish green with a powdery bloom, about 1.5–5.5 cm (0.59–2.2 in) long and 15–40 mm (0.59–1.6 in) wide. Leaves are either narrow or broad egg-shaped and arranged in opposite pairs, joined to the stem either in a wedge, heart, or stem-clasping configuration. The leaf margin may be entire, finely scalloped or with approximately 10 pairs of rough or shallow sharp teeth. Plants with narrower leaves generally grow in drier situations, whereas the broad-leaf form in wetter cooler locations. Leaves have 3-9 longitudinal veins radiating from the base. Numerous woody stems grow from a rootstock and form a clump, rarely branched below the inflorescence.

The inflorescence is a slender raceme, 10–45 cm (3.9–18 in) long with 25–70 flowers per stem. When fruiting the pedicel is 5–12 mm (0.20–0.47 in) long. The smooth calyx lobes are 3–5 mm (0.12–0.20 in) long and 0.5–1 cm (0.20–0.39 in) wide. The individual violet-blue flower petals are 7–12 mm (0.28–0.47 in) long. The seed capsules are egg-shaped 4.5–8.5 mm (0.18–0.33 in) long and 2.8–3.5 mm (0.11–0.14 in) wide. Capsules are barely flattened, dull, and either rounded or sharply pointed. Flowering occurs from October to February.

== Taxonomy and naming ==
Robert Brown first formally described the species in 1810, using V. perfoliata, in the botanical survey Prodromus Florae Novae Hollandiae. Constantine Rafinesque, Barbara Briggs and Friedrich Ehrendorfer changed the name to Parahebe perfoliata or Derwentia perfoliata, but the changes have not been accepted by the Australian Plant Census. The specific epithet (perfoliata) refers to the plant having "perfoliate" leaves, where the stem appears to be passing through the leaves. The common name "digger's speedwell" derives from a belief that the species is a reliable indicator of the presence of gold. "Speedwell" is a name for several species of veronica.

== Distribution and habitat ==
Digger's speedwell grows at higher altitudes between 530–1,780 m (1,700–5,800 ft) high in mountainous meadows, heath, eucalypt forest, and woodland in New South Wales, the Australian Capital Territory, and Victoria. It grows in similar areas to V. derwentiana but in shallow, often rocky soil on steep slopes rather than deeper soils in shaded sites. The broad range of the species contrasts with the belief that it indicates the presence of gold.
