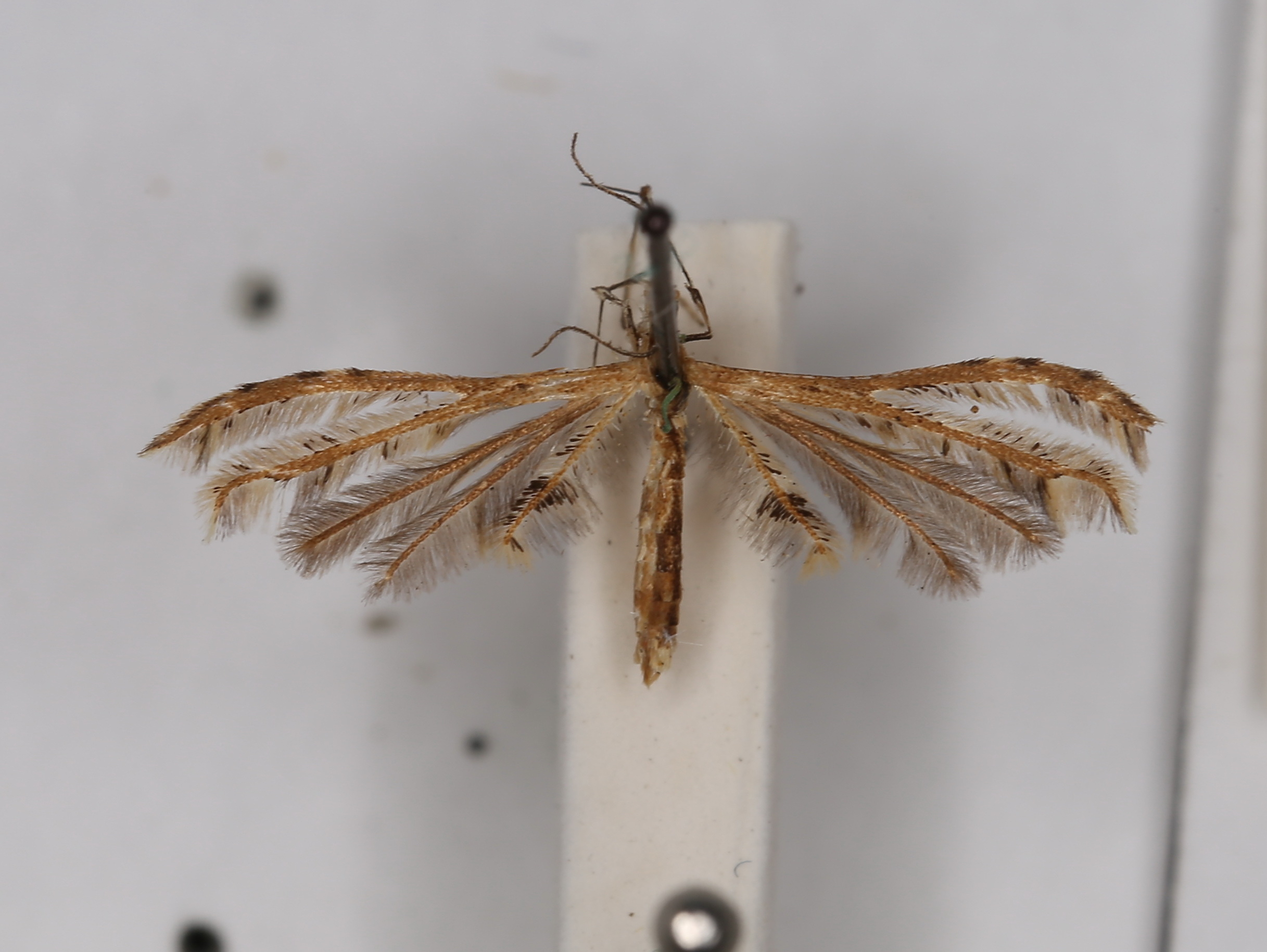
- Sphenarches zanclistes (Meyrick, 1905), Natural History Museum specimen NHMUK 010919178

Scientific classification
- Kingdom: Animalia
- Phylum: Arthropoda
- Class: Insecta
- Order: Lepidoptera
- Family: Pterophoridae
- Genus: Sphenarches
- Species: S. zanclistes

Binomial name
- Sphenarches zanclistes (Meyrick, 1905)

Synonyms
- Oxyptilus zanclistes Meyrick, 1905; Sphenarches zanclistis (Meyrick, 1905) (misspelling)

= Sphenarches zanclistes =

Species of plume moth

Sphenarches zanclistes is a moth of the family Pterophoridae that is found in Australia.

Its larvae have been recorded feeding on Dolichos lablab, Vigna unguiculata and Vigna sava.

== Original description ==
(wingspan male, female 16 mm) Head and thorax ochreous-whitish, irrorated with fuscous. Palpi white, second and terminal joints with oblique dark fuscous bars. Antennae white, lined with blackish. Abdomen whitish-ochreous, mixed with fuscous. Segments 1-3 with wedge-shaped dark fuscous dorsal marks, 4-6 wholly dark fuscous on dorsum. Forewing with segments extremely narrow, apex of second segment forming a very long slender sickle-shaped projection; fuscous, finely irrorated with whitish-ochreous; a cloudy dark fuscous discal dot at 1/3; an ochreous-whitish costal spot on middle of first segment; cilia, whitish-ochreous, dark fuscous spots in costal cilia before and beyond pale spot, two others posteriorly, and one at apex, lower cilia of first segment and upper of second with scattered dark fuscous scales, dorsal cilia with grey praetornal patch, and four slight scale-projections of two or three dark fuscous scales each, first mixed with whitish scales. Hindwings dark fuscous, third segment ochreous-whitish posteriorly, irrorated with dark fuscous; cilia of first two segments fuscous with slight purplish tinge, of third segment whitish-ochreous, on upper margin irregularly strewn with black scales and with a loose tuft of black scales at 2/3, on dorsum with a rather broad patch of black scales at 2/3 and a small tuft at apex. Two specimens, Fort Stedman, Burma (Manders). Differs from other described species by the especially long and slender apical projection of the second segment of forewings.

— Original description by Edward Meyrick
