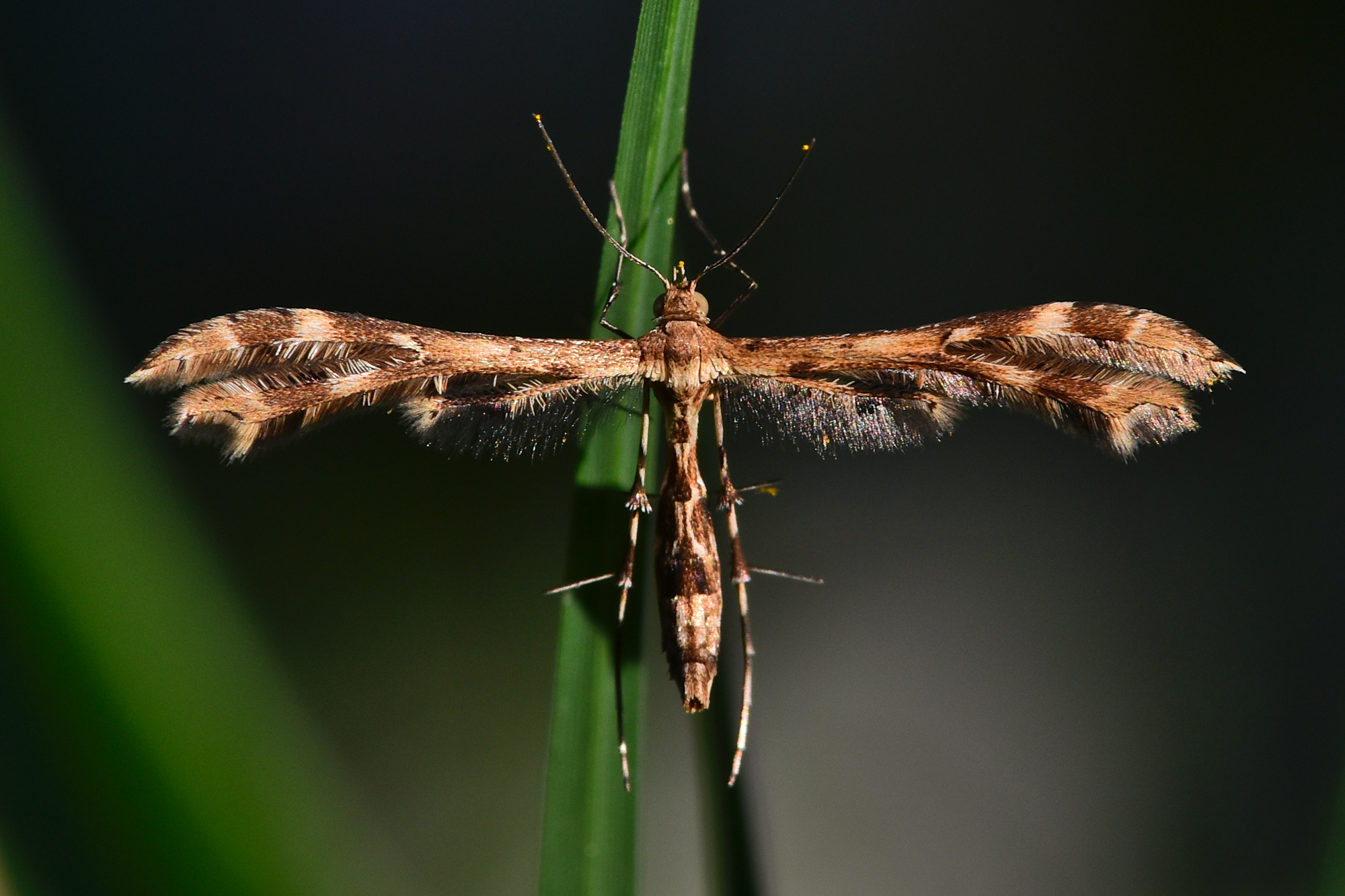

Scientific classification
- Kingdom: Animalia
- Phylum: Arthropoda
- Clade: Pancrustacea
- Class: Insecta
- Order: Lepidoptera
- Family: Pterophoridae
- Genus: Sphenarches
- Species: S. anisodactylus

Binomial name
- Sphenarches anisodactylus (Walker, 1864)

Synonyms
- Oxyptilus anisodactylus Walker, 1864; Pterophorus diffusalis Walker, 1864; Sphenarches synophrys Meyrick, 1886; Sphenarches chroesus Strand, 1913; Pselnophorus dolichos Matsumura, 1931; Megalorhipida rishwani Makhan, 1994

= Sphenarches anisodactylus =

Species of plume moth

Sphenarches anisodactylus, commonly known as the geranium plume moth or fire-flag plume moth, is a species of moth in the family Pterophoridae. It is found in western Africa, Madagascar, India, Sri Lanka, Thailand, Japan, the New Hebrides and Central and South America, as well as Australia, where it has been recorded from Cape York to central New South Wales. It is found in the United States, where it has been recorded from Florida, as well as Mississippi. It is also present in the Kermadec Islands of New Zealand.

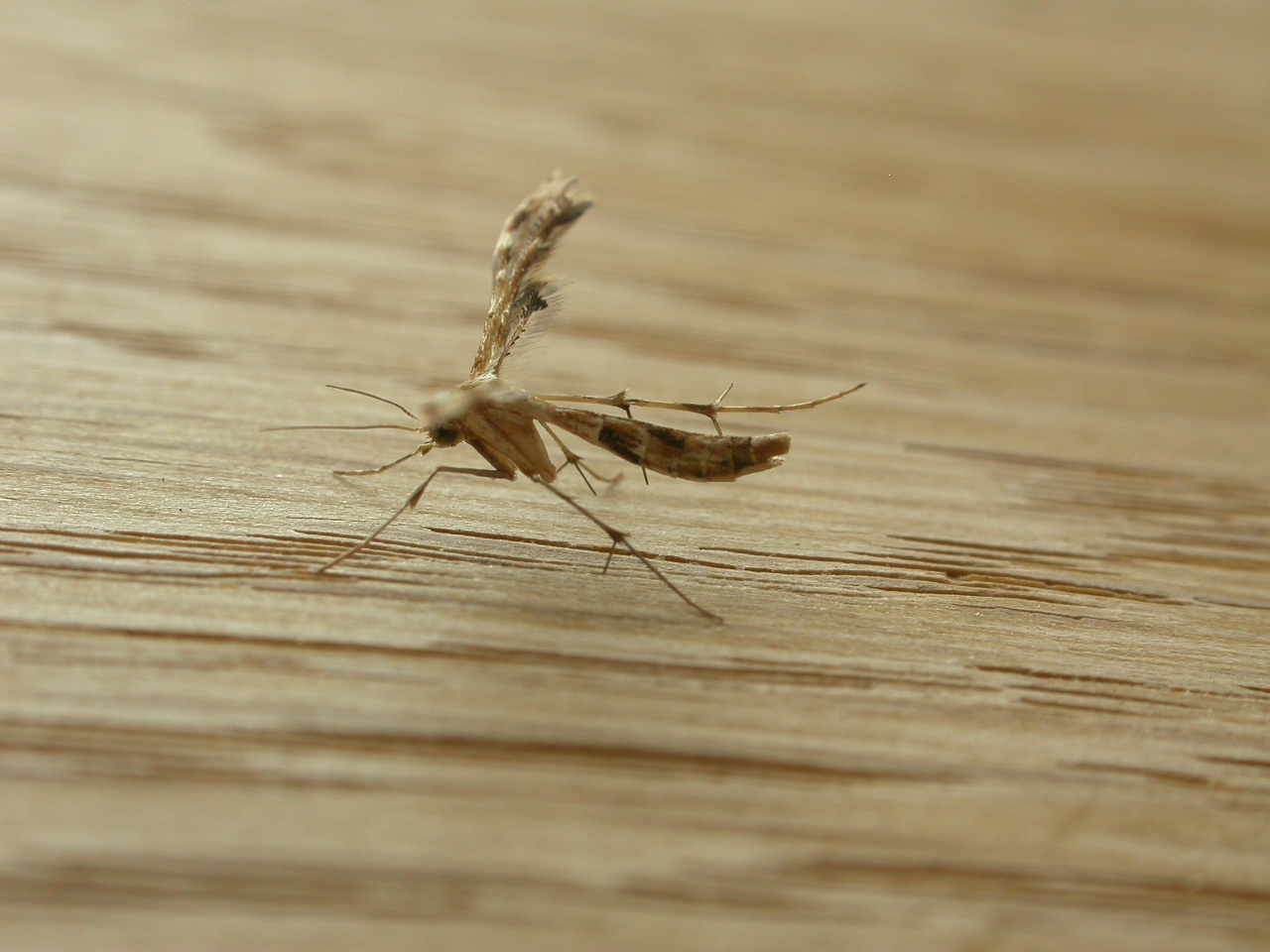

The wingspan is about 10 millimetres (0.39 in).

The larvae feed on flower buds and flowers of Dolichos lablab, Lagenaria, Pelargonium and Fabaceae species. Other recorded food plants include Brillantaisia lamium, Caperonia castaneifolia, Phaseolus vulgaris, Hibiscus mutabilis, Thalia geniculata, Mimosa pudica, Orchidaceae, Averrhoa bilimbi, Passiflora foetida, Antirrhinum majus, Theobroma cacao and Lantana camara.
