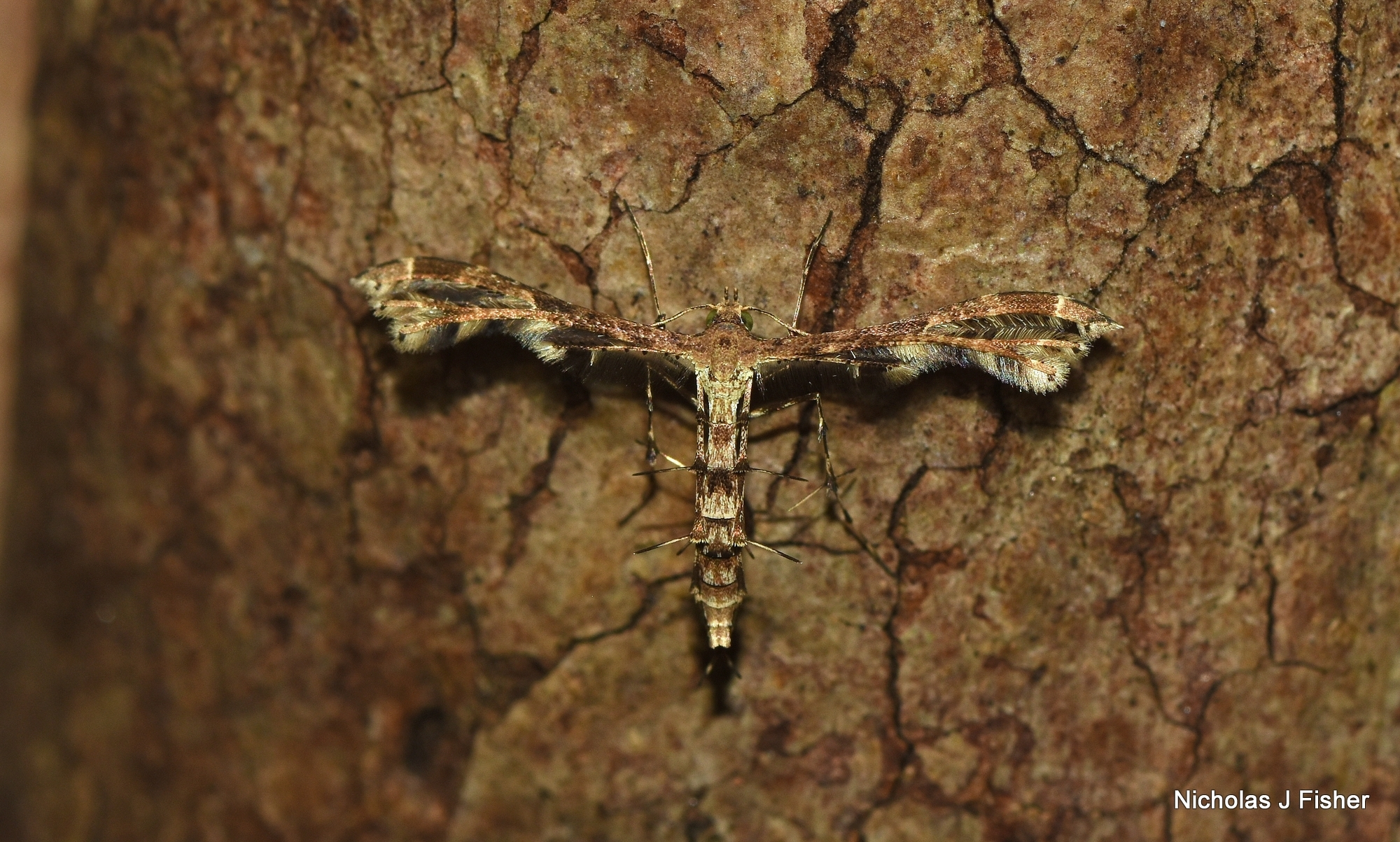

Scientific classification
- Kingdom: Animalia
- Phylum: Arthropoda
- Class: Insecta
- Order: Lepidoptera
- Family: Pterophoridae
- Genus: Hexadactilia
- Species: H. civilis

Binomial name
- Hexadactilia civilis Meyrick, 1921

= Hexadactilia civilis =

Species of plume moth

Hexadactilia civilis is a moth of the family Pterophoridae. It was described by Edward Meyrick as Hexadactylia civilis (genus misspelled) and is found in Queensland and New South Wales, Australia.

== Original description ==
♂ ♀. 15-16 mm. Head light fuscous, obscure whitish bars on forehead and lower part of face. Palpi fuscous irrorated black and ringed whitish. Thorax light fuscous, anteriorly mixed dark grey. Abdomen fuscous sprinkled darker, segmental margins whitish. Forewings cleft firstly towards middle, second segment also cleft nearly to middle: light brownish or fuscous, obscurely and irregularly irrorated darker, base, costa, and fold suffusedly irrorated dark fuscous; a blackish line in disc from 1/4 to base of cleft; lower segments and basal half of lirst rather suffused brownish-ochreous; a slender whitish direct bar crossing first segment at 3/4 of its length, preceded by a darker area, and less distinct bars on other two segments: cilia grey mixed whitish, blackish-grey towards base on angles of each segment, whitish beneath each of these places, and on dorsum beneath base of each cleft. Hindwings grey irrorated blackish: cilia grey, whitish at apex of third segment, scattered black scales on both margins of third segment, and a triangular black scale-projection beneath extending from 2/3 to near apex. Queensland, Brisbane, January (Dodd); 3 ex. Type Wals. Coll. (18819).

— Original description by Edward Meyrick
