= Hellinsia tinctidactylus =

Scientific classification
- Kingdom: Animalia
- Phylum: Arthropoda
- Clade: Pancrustacea
- Class: Insecta
- Order: Lepidoptera
- Family: Pterophoridae
- Genus: Hellinsia
- Species: H. tinctidactylus

Binomial name
- Hellinsia tinctidactylus (Newman, 1856)

Synonyms
- Pterophorus tinctidactylus Newman, 1856

Species of moth

Hellinsia tinctidactylus is a moth of the family Pterophoridae. It is found in Australia.
