= Xyroptila marmarias =

Scientific classification
- Kingdom: Animalia
- Phylum: Arthropoda
- Class: Insecta
- Order: Lepidoptera
- Family: Pterophoridae
- Genus: Xyroptila
- Species: X. marmarias

Binomial name
- Xyroptila marmarias Meyrick, 1908

Species of plume moth

Xyroptila marmarias is a moth of the family Pterophoridae. It is found on the Atherton Tableland in Queensland, Australia, and it is also known from New Guinea.

The bright colours of the adult suggest it is a day active species.

Its biology is unknown, but the larvae of various related species feed on flowers.
