= Stenodacma pyrrhodes =

Scientific classification
- Kingdom: Animalia
- Phylum: Arthropoda
- Class: Insecta
- Order: Lepidoptera
- Family: Pterophoridae
- Genus: Stenodacma
- Species: S. pyrrhodes

Binomial name
- Stenodacma pyrrhodes (Meyrick, 1889)

Synonyms
- Trichoptilus pyrrhodes Meyrick, 1889; Oxyptilus kinbane Matsumura, 1931; Trichoptilus kinbane

Species of plume moth

Stenodacma pyrrhodes is a moth of the family Pterophoridae. It has a wide range and has been recorded from Australia, India, Japan, South Africa, China, Nepal, Pakistan, Sri Lanka, Vietnam, Thailand and Korea. The species was first described by Edward Meyrick in 1889.

The wingspan is 10–11 millimetres (0.39–0.43 in).

== Taxonomy ==
Stenodacma pyrrhodes was placed as a synonym of Stenodacma wahlbergi (Zeller, 1851), but S. pyrrhodes was restored as a valid species by Ernst Arenberger in 2002.
