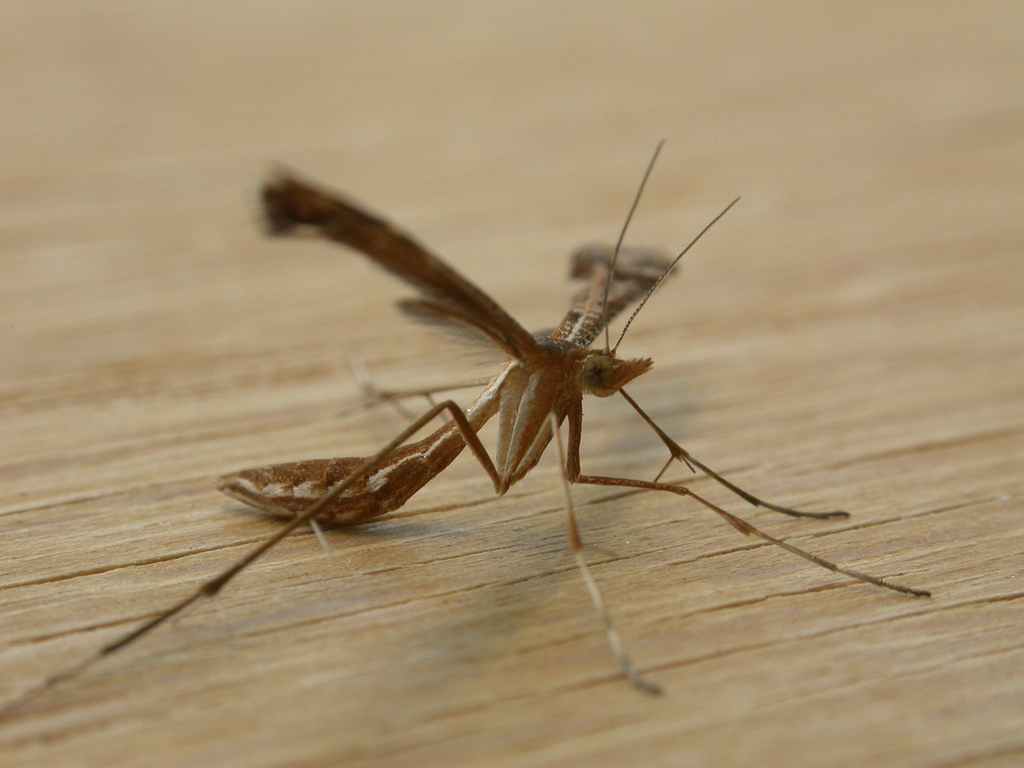

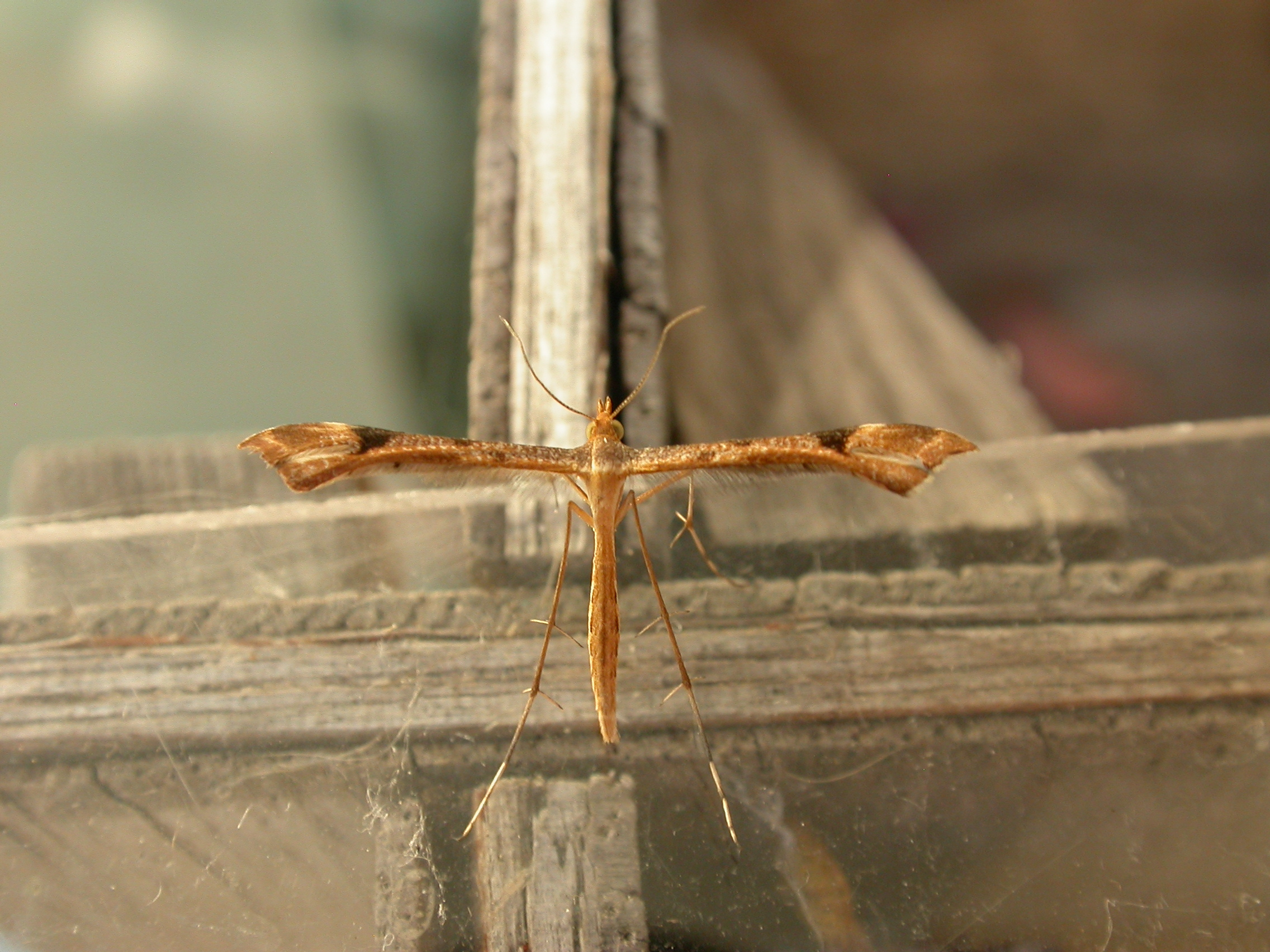

Scientific classification
- Kingdom: Animalia
- Phylum: Arthropoda
- Class: Insecta
- Order: Lepidoptera
- Family: Pterophoridae
- Genus: Sinpunctiptilia
- Species: S. emissalis

Binomial name
- Sinpunctiptilia emissalis Walker, 1864

Synonyms
- Platyptilus emissalis Walker 1864; Platyptilia emissalis Walker, 1864; Platyptilia omissalis T. B. Fletcher, 1926 (Note: May be considered either a synonym or a valid, separate species.); Gillmeria omissalis (T. B. Fletcher, 1926) (Note: Considered synonymous to P. omissalis; synonymity to S. emissalis thus depends on taxonomical status of P. omissalis); Paraplatyptilia omissalis (T. B. Fletcher, 1926) (Note: See G. omissalis)

= Sinpunctiptilia emissalis =

Species of plume moth

Sinpunctiptilia emissalis is a moth of the family Pterophoridae. It is found in Australia, including Tasmania.

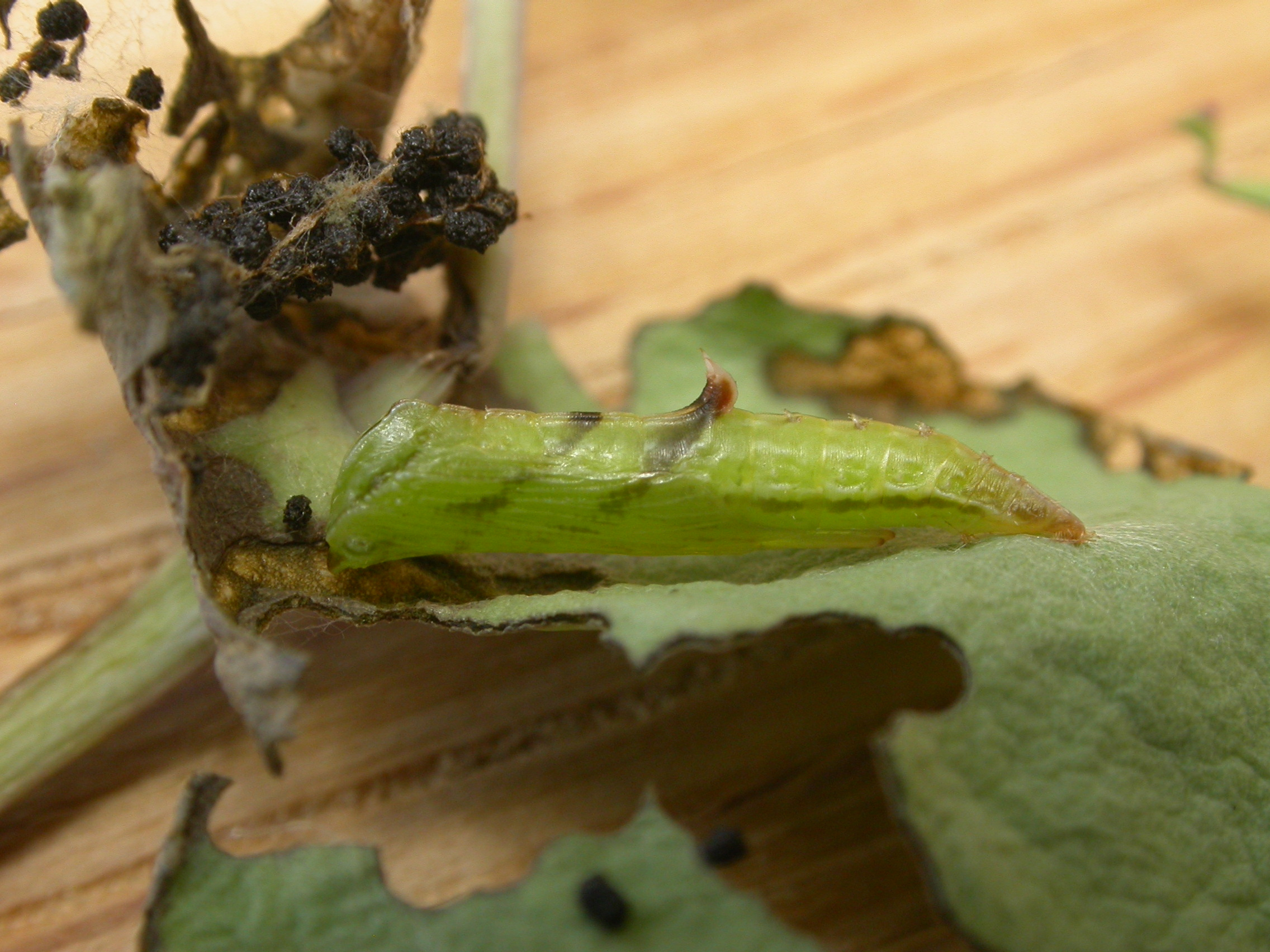
Pupa on Derwentia perfoliata

The larvae feed on the leaves of Derwentia perfoliata.
