= Xyroptila elegans =

Scientific classification
- Kingdom: Animalia
- Phylum: Arthropoda
- Clade: Pancrustacea
- Class: Insecta
- Order: Lepidoptera
- Family: Pterophoridae
- Genus: Xyroptila
- Species: X. elegans

Binomial name
- Xyroptila elegans Kovtunovich & Ustjuzhanin, 2006

Species of plume moth

Xyroptila elegans is a moth of the family Pterophoridae. It is found in north-eastern New Guinea and Australia.
