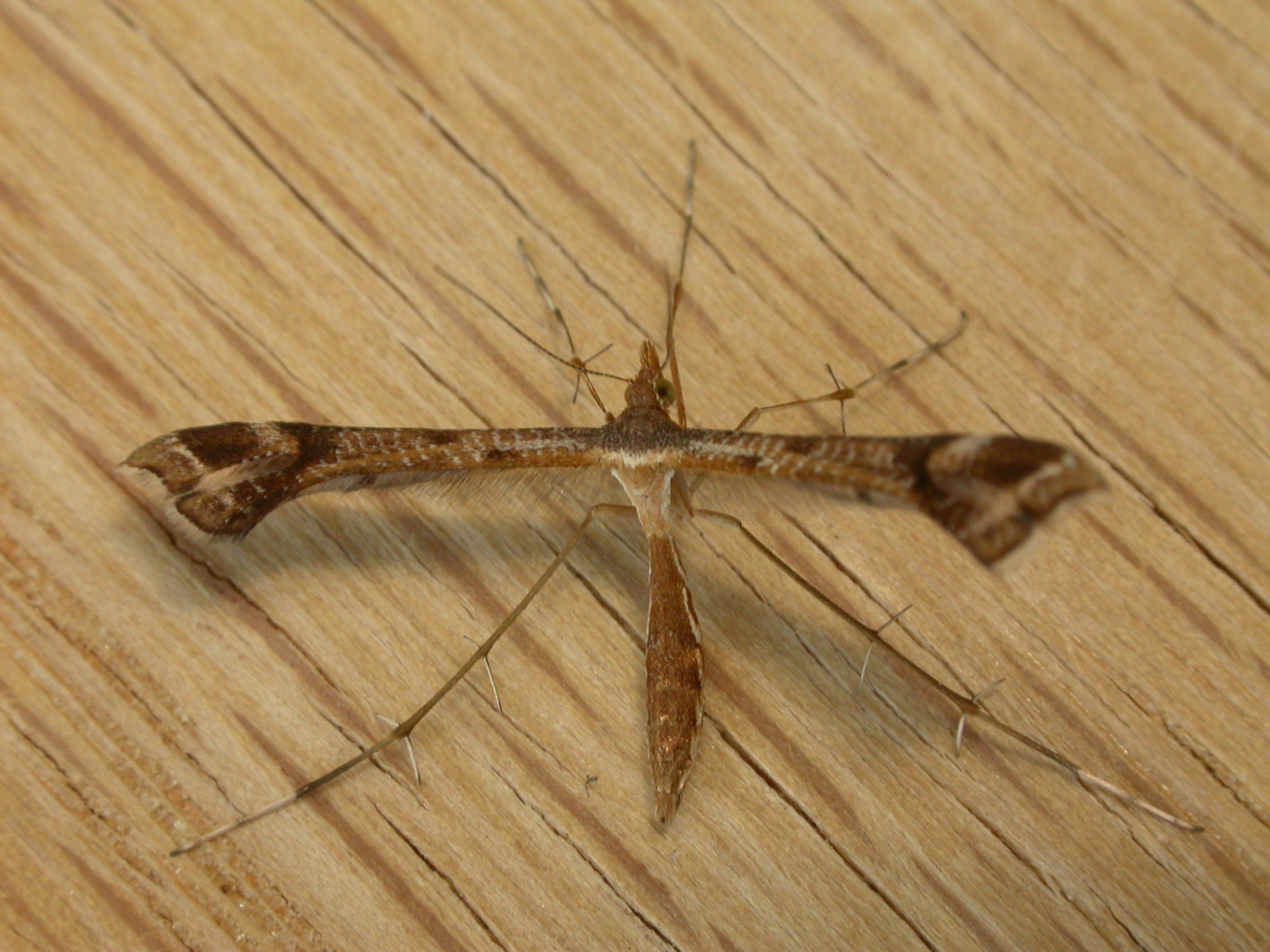

Scientific classification
- Kingdom: Animalia
- Phylum: Arthropoda
- Clade: Pancrustacea
- Class: Insecta
- Order: Lepidoptera
- Family: Pterophoridae
- Genus: Platyptilia
- Species: P. omissalis

Binomial name
- Platyptilia omissalis T. B. Fletcher, 1926

Synonyms
- Gillmeria omissalis (T. B. Fletcher, 1926)

= Platyptilia omissalis =

Species of plume moth

Platyptilia omissalis is a moth of the family Pterophoridae. The species was described by Thomas Bainbrigge Fletcher in 1926. It is found in Australia from southern Queensland to Victoria, south-western Australia and Tasmania.

Some authors consider it a synonym of Sinpunctiptilia emissalis.

Adults have a weak, almost hovering flight.

The larvae feed on the leaves of Parahebe species, including Parahebe perfoliata.
