= List of moths of India (Alucitidae) =

This article is an incomplete list of moths of the family Alucitidae that are found in India. It also acts as an index to the species articles and forms part of the full List of moths of India.

== Alucitidae ==
- Alucita anemolia (Meyrick, 1929)
- Alucita magadis (Meyrick, 1907)
- Alucita mesolychna (Meyrick, 1907)
- Alucita trachyptera (Meyrick, 1906)
- Alucita triscausta (Meyrick, 1907)
- Alucita pygmaea Meyrick, 1890
- Alucita rhymotoma (Meyrick, 1921)
- Alucita sikkima (Moore, 1887)
- Pterotopteryx spilodesma (Meyrick, 1907)
