= List of moths of Australia (Alucitidae) =

Partial list of Australian moths

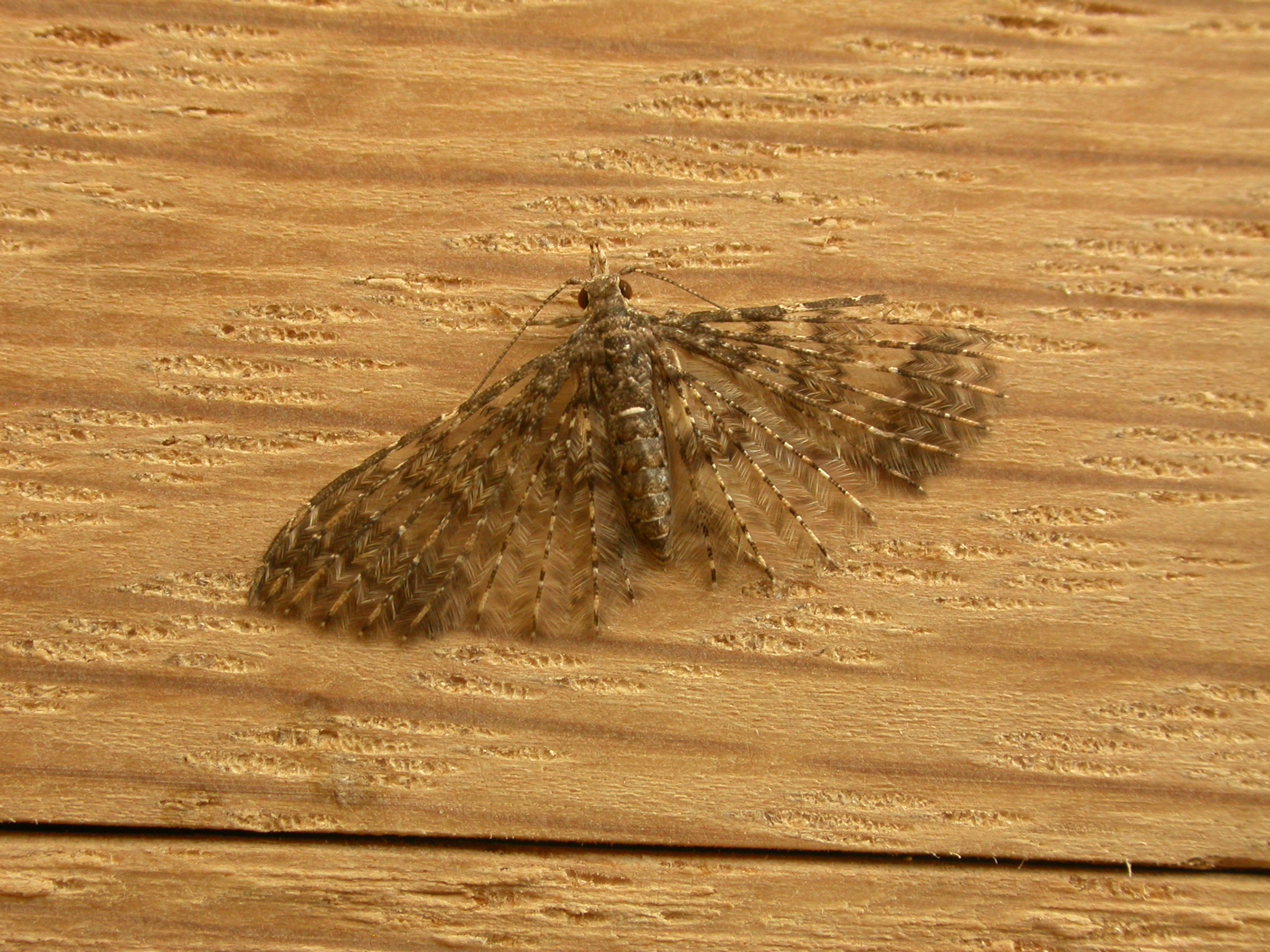
Alucita phricodes

The family Alucitidae, consists of the moths known as the many-plumed moths. This is a list of the Australian members of Alucitidae. It also acts as an index to the species articles and forms part of the full List of moths of Australia.

- Alucita acascaea (Turner, 1913)
- Alucita agapeta (Turner, 1913)
- Alucita phricodes Meyrick, 1886
- Alucita pygmaea Meyrick, 1890
- Alucita xanthodes Meyrick, 1890
- Alucita xanthosticta (Turner, 1923)
