= Alucita xanthozona =

Alucita xanthozona may refer to any one of two species of moths in the genus Alucita of the family Alucitidae:

- Alucita xanthozona (Diakonoff, 1954)
- Alucita xanthozona (Clarke, 1986)
