= Alucita nubifera =

Scientific classification
- Kingdom: Animalia
- Phylum: Arthropoda
- Class: Insecta
- Order: Lepidoptera
- Family: Alucitidae
- Genus: Alucita
- Species: A. nubifera

Binomial name
- Alucita nubifera (Meyrick, 1921)

Synonyms
- Orneodes nubifera Meyrick, 1921

Species of many-plumed moth in genus Alucita

Alucita nubifera is a moth of the family Alucitidae. It is found in Colombia.
