= Alucita brunnea =

Scientific classification
- Kingdom: Animalia
- Phylum: Arthropoda
- Class: Insecta
- Order: Lepidoptera
- Family: Alucitidae
- Genus: Alucita
- Species: A. brunnea

Binomial name
- Alucita brunnea (T. B. Fletcher, 1925)

Synonyms
- Orneodes brunnea T. B. Fletcher, 1925

Species of many-plumed moth in genus Alucita

Alucita brunnea is a moth of the family Alucitidae. It is found in the Amazon basin.
