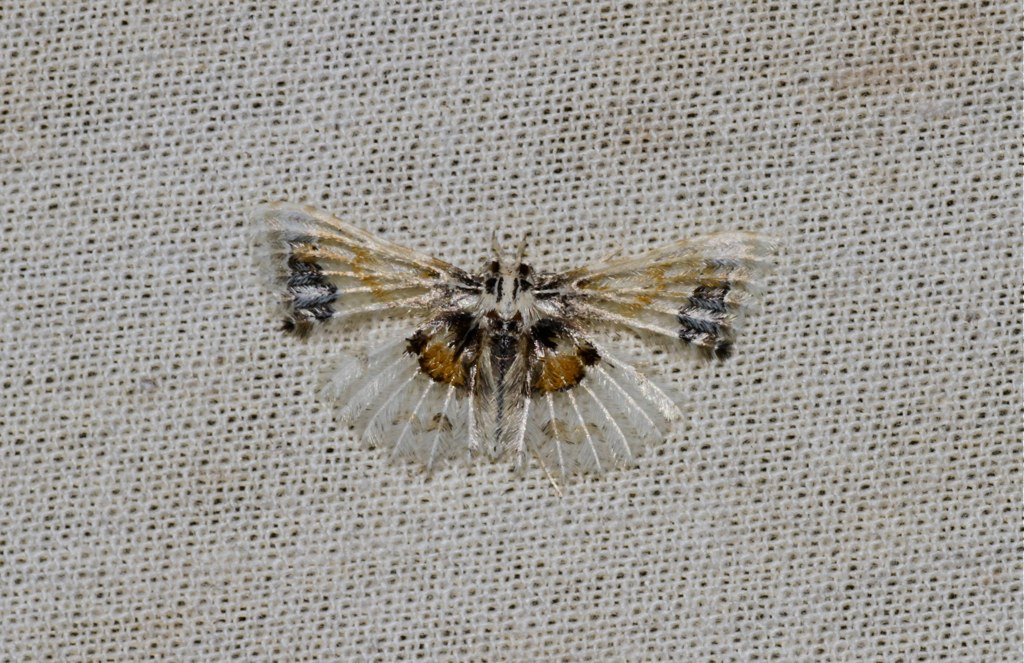

Scientific classification
- Kingdom: Animalia
- Phylum: Arthropoda
- Clade: Pancrustacea
- Class: Insecta
- Order: Lepidoptera
- Family: Alucitidae
- Genus: Alucita
- Species: A. habrophila

Binomial name
- Alucita habrophila (Meyrick, 1920)

Synonyms
- Orneodes habrophila Meyrick, 1920

= Alucita habrophila =

Species of many-plumed moth in genus Alucita

Alucita habrophila is a species of moth of the family Alucitidae. It is known from South Africa.
