= Alucita helena =

Scientific classification
- Kingdom: Animalia
- Phylum: Arthropoda
- Class: Insecta
- Order: Lepidoptera
- Family: Alucitidae
- Genus: Alucita
- Species: A. helena

Binomial name
- Alucita helena Ustjuzhanin, 1993

Species of many-plumed moth in genus Alucita

Alucita helena is a moth of the family Alucitidae. It is found in Russia (the South Siberian Mountains).
