= Alucita brachyzona =

Scientific classification
- Kingdom: Animalia
- Phylum: Arthropoda
- Class: Insecta
- Order: Lepidoptera
- Family: Alucitidae
- Genus: Alucita
- Species: A. brachyzona

Binomial name
- Alucita brachyzona (Meyrick, 1920)

Synonyms
- Orneodes brachyzona Meyrick, 1920

Species of many-plumed moth in genus Alucita

Alucita brachyzona is a species of moth of the family Alucitidae. It is known from South Africa.
