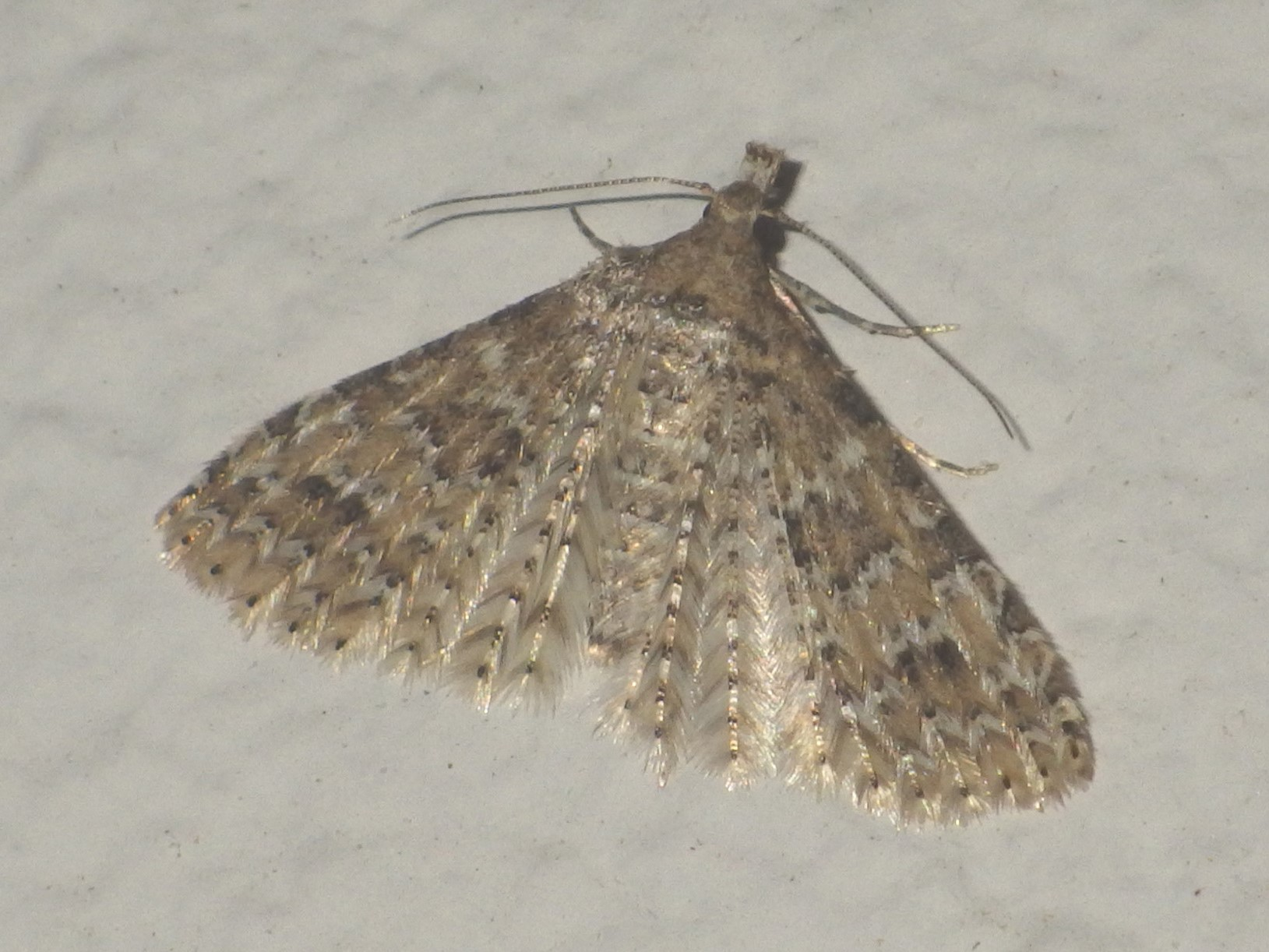

Scientific classification
- Kingdom: Animalia
- Phylum: Arthropoda
- Clade: Pancrustacea
- Class: Insecta
- Order: Lepidoptera
- Family: Alucitidae
- Genus: Alucita
- Species: A. pectinata

Binomial name
- Alucita pectinata Scholz & Jackh, 1994

= Alucita pectinata =

Species of many-plumed moth in genus Alucita

Alucita pectinata is a species of moth in the family Alucitidae. It is found in Greece.
