= Alucita imbrifera =

Scientific classification
- Kingdom: Animalia
- Phylum: Arthropoda
- Class: Insecta
- Order: Lepidoptera
- Family: Alucitidae
- Genus: Alucita
- Species: A. imbrifera

Binomial name
- Alucita imbrifera (Meyrick, 1929)

Synonyms
- Orneodes imbrifera Meyrick, 1929

Species of many-plumed moth in genus Alucita

Alucita imbrifera is a species of moth of the family Alucitidae. It is known from the Republic of Congo.
