= Alucita abenahoensis =

Scientific classification
- Kingdom: Animalia
- Phylum: Arthropoda
- Class: Insecta
- Order: Lepidoptera
- Family: Alucitidae
- Genus: Alucita
- Species: A. abenahoensis

Binomial name
- Alucita abenahoensis Gielis, 2009

Many-plumed moth species of genus Alucita

Alucita abenahoensis is a moth in the family Alucitidae. It is found in Irian Jaya, Indonesia.
