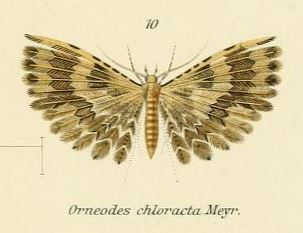

Scientific classification
- Kingdom: Animalia
- Phylum: Arthropoda
- Class: Insecta
- Order: Lepidoptera
- Family: Alucitidae
- Genus: Alucita
- Species: A. chloracta

Binomial name
- Alucita chloracta (Meyrick, 1908)

Synonyms
- Orneodes chloracta Meyrick, 1908

= Alucita chloracta =

Species of many-plumed moth in genus Alucita

Alucita chloracta is a species of moth of the family Alucitidae. It is known from Benin.
