= Alucita panolbia =

Scientific classification
- Kingdom: Animalia
- Phylum: Arthropoda
- Class: Insecta
- Order: Lepidoptera
- Family: Alucitidae
- Genus: Alucita
- Species: A. panolbia

Binomial name
- Alucita panolbia (Walsingham, 1915)

Synonyms
- Orneodes panolbia Walsingham, 1915

Species of many-plumed moth in genus Alucita

Alucita panolbia is a moth in the family Alucitidae. It is found in Guatemala.

The wingspan is about 19 mm.
