= Alucita ancalopa =

Scientific classification
- Kingdom: Animalia
- Phylum: Arthropoda
- Class: Insecta
- Order: Lepidoptera
- Family: Alucitidae
- Genus: Alucita
- Species: A. ancalopa

Binomial name
- Alucita ancalopa (Meyrick, 1922)

Synonyms
- Orneodes ancalopa Meyrick, 1922

Species of many-plumed moth in genus Alucita

Alucita ancalopa is a moth of the family Alucitidae. It is found in Brazil and French Guiana.
