= Alucita iranensis =

Scientific classification
- Kingdom: Animalia
- Phylum: Arthropoda
- Class: Insecta
- Order: Lepidoptera
- Family: Alucitidae
- Genus: Alucita
- Species: A. iranensis

Binomial name
- Alucita iranensis Scholz & Jäckh, 1994

Species of many-plumed moth in genus Alucita

Alucita iranensis is a moth of the family Alucitidae. It is found in Iran.
