= Alucita brachyphinus =

Scientific classification
- Kingdom: Animalia
- Phylum: Arthropoda
- Class: Insecta
- Order: Lepidoptera
- Family: Alucitidae
- Genus: Alucita
- Species: A. brachyphinus

Binomial name
- Alucita brachyphinus (Hering, 1917)

Synonyms
- Orneodes brachyphinus Diakonoff, 1954

Species of many-plumed moth in genus Alucita

Alucita brachyphinus is a moth of the family Alucitidae. It was described by Erich Martin Hering in 1917. It is found in New Guinea.
