= Alucita tridentata =

Scientific classification
- Kingdom: Animalia
- Phylum: Arthropoda
- Clade: Pancrustacea
- Class: Insecta
- Order: Lepidoptera
- Family: Alucitidae
- Genus: Alucita
- Species: A. tridentata

Binomial name
- Alucita tridentata Scholz & Jackh, 1994

Species of many-plumed moth in genus Alucita

Alucita tridentata is a moth of the family Alucitidae. It is found in France, Italy, Turkey and on Corsica and Sicily.
