= Alucita kosterini =

Scientific classification
- Kingdom: Animalia
- Phylum: Arthropoda
- Clade: Pancrustacea
- Class: Insecta
- Order: Lepidoptera
- Family: Alucitidae
- Genus: Alucita
- Species: A. kosterini

Binomial name
- Alucita kosterini Ustjuzhanin, 1999

Species of many-plumed moth in genus Alucita

Alucita kosterini is a moth of the family Alucitidae. It is found on the highlands of the Zeravshanskii Ridge in Tajikistan.

The wingspan is 13–14 mm. The ground colour of the adults is grey, with a vague, very uncontrasted pattern. Adults have been recorded in May.
