= Alucita punctiferella =

Scientific classification
- Kingdom: Animalia
- Phylum: Arthropoda
- Class: Insecta
- Order: Lepidoptera
- Family: Alucitidae
- Genus: Alucita
- Species: A. punctiferella

Binomial name
- Alucita punctiferella Walker, 1866

Synonyms
- Orneodes punctiferella (Walker, 1866)

Species of many-plumed moth in genus Alucita

Alucita punctiferella is a moth in the family Alucitidae. It is found in Honduras.
