= Alucita klimeschi =

Scientific classification
- Kingdom: Animalia
- Phylum: Arthropoda
- Clade: Pancrustacea
- Class: Insecta
- Order: Lepidoptera
- Family: Alucitidae
- Genus: Alucita
- Species: A. klimeschi

Binomial name
- Alucita klimeschi Scholz & Jackh, 1997

Species of many-plumed moth in genus Alucita

Alucita klimeschi is a moth of the family Alucitidae. It is found on Cyprus. It has also been recorded from Turkey and Russia.
