= Alucita cymatodactyla =

Scientific classification
- Kingdom: Animalia
- Phylum: Arthropoda
- Clade: Pancrustacea
- Class: Insecta
- Order: Lepidoptera
- Family: Alucitidae
- Genus: Alucita
- Species: A. cymatodactyla

Binomial name
- Alucita cymatodactyla Zeller, 1852

Synonyms
- Alucita baldizzonella Nel, 2001

Species of many-plumed moth in genus Alucita

Alucita cymatodactyla is a moth of the family Alucitidae. It is found in France, Spain, Italy, Slovenia, Hungary, Croatia, Bosnia and Herzegovina, Albania, Bulgaria, the Republic of Macedonia, Iran, Israel, Lebanon, and Turkey. The habitat consists of dry and semi-dry closed grasslands and riverine ash-alder woodlands.

In Hungary, adults emerge in September, overwinter, and are active again in spring, from April to early July.
