= Alucita deboeri =

Scientific classification
- Kingdom: Animalia
- Phylum: Arthropoda
- Class: Insecta
- Order: Lepidoptera
- Family: Alucitidae
- Genus: Alucita
- Species: A. deboeri

Binomial name
- Alucita deboeri Gielis, 2009

Species of many-plumed moth in genus Alucita

Alucita deboeri is a moth of the family Alucitidae. It was described by Cees Gielis in 2009. It is found in Papua New Guinea.

This species belongs to a group of species with white forewings and has a wingspan of 15 mm.
