= Alucita proseni =

Scientific classification
- Kingdom: Animalia
- Phylum: Arthropoda
- Class: Insecta
- Order: Lepidoptera
- Family: Alucitidae
- Genus: Alucita
- Species: A. proseni

Binomial name
- Alucita proseni (Pastrana, 1951)

Synonyms
- Orneodes proseni Pastrana, 1951

Species of many-plumed moth in genus Alucita

Alucita proseni is a moth of the family Alucitidae. It is found in Argentina, specifically the province of Jujuy.

The larvae possibly feed on the Tecoma species of shrub.
