= Alucita xanthozona (Clarke, 1986) =

Scientific classification
- Kingdom: Animalia
- Phylum: Arthropoda
- Class: Insecta
- Order: Lepidoptera
- Family: Alucitidae
- Genus: Alucita
- Species: A. xanthozona

Binomial name
- Alucita xanthozona (Clarke, 1986)

Synonyms
- Orneodes xanthozona Clarke, 1986

Species of many-plumed moth in genus Alucita

Alucita xanthozona is a moth of the family Alucitidae. It was described by Clarke in 1986. It is found on the Marquesas Archipelago.

== Taxonomy ==
The name xanthozona is preoccupied by Diakonoff's species Alucita xanthozona and in need of renaming.
