= Alucita patria =

Scientific classification
- Kingdom: Animalia
- Phylum: Arthropoda
- Class: Insecta
- Order: Lepidoptera
- Family: Alucitidae
- Genus: Alucita
- Species: A. patria

Binomial name
- Alucita patria (Meyrick, 1922)

Synonyms
- Orneodes patria Meyrick, 1922

Species of many-plumed moth in genus Alucita

Alucita patria is a moth of the family Alucitidae. It is found in Guyana.
