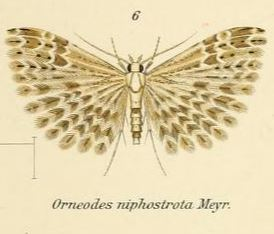

Scientific classification
- Kingdom: Animalia
- Phylum: Arthropoda
- Class: Insecta
- Order: Lepidoptera
- Family: Alucitidae
- Genus: Alucita
- Species: A. niphostrota

Binomial name
- Alucita niphostrota (Meyrick, 1907)

Synonyms
- Orneodes niphostrota Meyrick, 1907

= Alucita niphostrota =

Species of many-plumed moth in genus Alucita

Alucita niphostrota is a moth of the family Alucitidae. It is found in Sri Lanka.
