= Alucita araxella =

Scientific classification
- Kingdom: Animalia
- Phylum: Arthropoda
- Class: Insecta
- Order: Lepidoptera
- Family: Alucitidae
- Genus: Alucita
- Species: A. araxella

Binomial name
- Alucita araxella Zagulajev, 2000

Species of many-plumed moth in genus Alucita

Alucita araxella is a moth of the family Alucitidae. It is found in south-eastern Armenia.
