= Alucita flaviserta =

Scientific classification
- Kingdom: Animalia
- Phylum: Arthropoda
- Class: Insecta
- Order: Lepidoptera
- Family: Alucitidae
- Genus: Alucita
- Species: A. flaviserta

Binomial name
- Alucita flaviserta (Meyrick, 1921)

Synonyms
- Orneodes flaviserta Meyrick, 1921

Species of many-plumed moth in genus Alucita

Alucita flaviserta is a species of moth of the family Alucitidae. It is known from Mozambique.

The male of this species has a wingspan of 14 mm. The head is white with few dark fuscous specks. Thorax is white, with the anterior half irrorated (speckled) with dark grey and two small greyish spots posteriorly. Abdomen whitish. Forewings are white with a blackish semioval spot at costa near the base. Markings are ochreous-yellow.

The holotype was found in Magude in southern Mozambique.
