= Alucita certifica =

Scientific classification
- Kingdom: Animalia
- Phylum: Arthropoda
- Class: Insecta
- Order: Lepidoptera
- Family: Alucitidae
- Genus: Alucita
- Species: A. certifica

Binomial name
- Alucita certifica (Meyrick, 1909)

Synonyms
- Orneodes certifica Meyrick, 1909

Species of many-plumed moth in genus Alucita

Alucita certifica is a species of moth of the family Alucitidae. It is known from South Africa.
