= Alucita megaphimus =

Scientific classification
- Kingdom: Animalia
- Phylum: Arthropoda
- Class: Insecta
- Order: Lepidoptera
- Family: Alucitidae
- Genus: Alucita
- Species: A. megaphimus

Binomial name
- Alucita megaphimus (Hering, 1917)

Synonyms
- Orneodes megaphimus Hering, 1917

Species of many-plumed moth in genus Alucita

Alucita megaphimus is a species of moth of the family Alucitidae. It is known from Cameroon.
