= Alucita pterochroma =

Scientific classification
- Kingdom: Animalia
- Phylum: Arthropoda
- Class: Insecta
- Order: Lepidoptera
- Family: Alucitidae
- Genus: Alucita
- Species: A. pterochroma

Binomial name
- Alucita pterochroma (J. F. G. Clarke, 1986)

Synonyms
- Orneodes pterochroma J. F. G. Clarke, 1986

Species of many-plumed moth in genus Alucita

Alucita pterochroma is a moth of the family Alucitidae. It was described by John Frederick Gates Clarke in 1986. It is found on the Marquesas Archipelago in French Polynesia.
