= Alucita coffeina =

Scientific classification
- Kingdom: Animalia
- Phylum: Arthropoda
- Class: Insecta
- Order: Lepidoptera
- Family: Alucitidae
- Genus: Alucita
- Species: A. coffeina

Binomial name
- Alucita coffeina (Viette, 1958)

Synonyms
- Orneodes coffeina Viette, 1958

Species of many-plumed moth in genus Alucita

Alucita coffeina is a species of moth in the family Alucitidae, known from Gabon.
