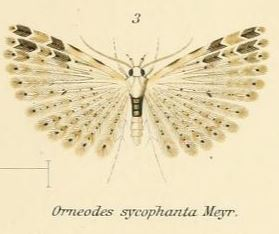

Scientific classification
- Kingdom: Animalia
- Phylum: Arthropoda
- Class: Insecta
- Order: Lepidoptera
- Family: Alucitidae
- Genus: Alucita
- Species: A. sycophanta

Binomial name
- Alucita sycophanta (Meyrick, 1906)

Synonyms
- Orneodes sycophanta Meyrick, 1906

= Alucita sycophanta =

Species of many-plumed moth in genus Alucita

Alucita sycophanta is a moth of the family Alucitidae. It is found in Sri Lanka.
