= Alucita adzharica =

Scientific classification
- Kingdom: Animalia
- Phylum: Arthropoda
- Clade: Pancrustacea
- Class: Insecta
- Order: Lepidoptera
- Family: Alucitidae
- Genus: Alucita
- Species: A. adzharica

Binomial name
- Alucita adzharica Zagulajev, 1994

Species of many-plumed moth in genus Alucita

Alucita adzharica is a moth of the family Alucitidae.
