= Alucita longipalpella =

Scientific classification
- Kingdom: Animalia
- Phylum: Arthropoda
- Class: Insecta
- Order: Lepidoptera
- Family: Alucitidae
- Genus: Alucita
- Species: A. longipalpella

Binomial name
- Alucita longipalpella (Caradja, 1939)

Synonyms
- Orneodes longipalpella Caradja, 1939

Species of many-plumed moth in genus Alucita

Alucita longipalpella is a moth of the family Alucitidae. It is found in China (the Yangtze Valley).
