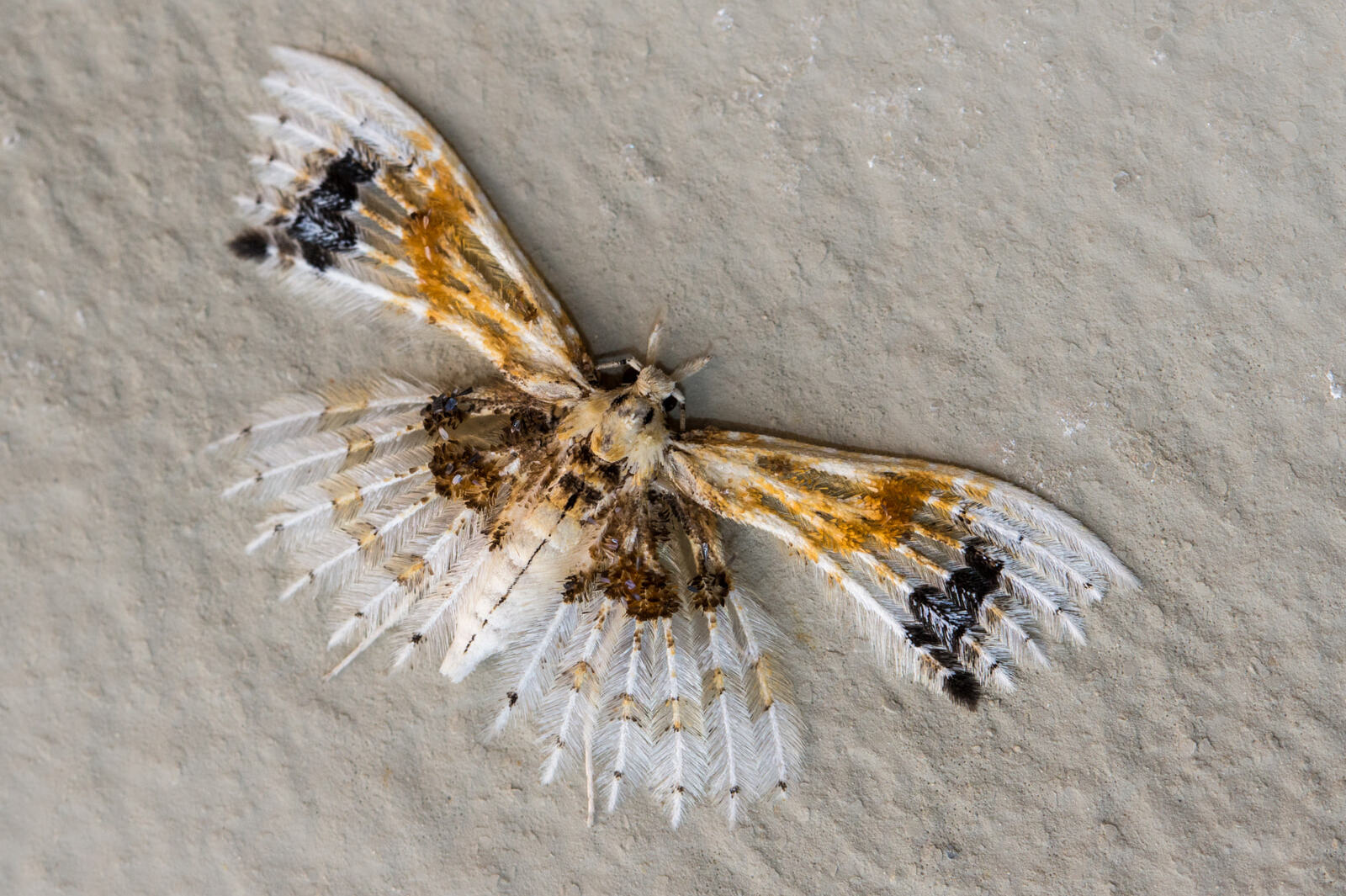

Scientific classification
- Kingdom: Animalia
- Phylum: Arthropoda
- Class: Insecta
- Order: Lepidoptera
- Family: Alucitidae
- Genus: Alucita
- Species: A. phanerarcha

Binomial name
- Alucita phanerarcha (Meyrick, 1924)

Synonyms
- Orneodes phanerarcha Meyrick, 1924

= Alucita phanerarcha =

Species of many-plumed moth in genus Alucita

Alucita phanerarcha is a species of moth of the family Alucitidae. It is known from South Africa.
