= Alucita sakhalinica =

Scientific classification
- Kingdom: Animalia
- Phylum: Arthropoda
- Clade: Pancrustacea
- Class: Insecta
- Order: Lepidoptera
- Family: Alucitidae
- Genus: Alucita
- Species: A. sakhalinica

Binomial name
- Alucita sakhalinica Zagulajev, 1995

Species of many-plumed moth in genus Alucita

Alucita sakhalinica is a moth of the family Alucitidae. It is found in Sakhalin, Russia.
