= Alucita ussurica =

Scientific classification
- Kingdom: Animalia
- Phylum: Arthropoda
- Clade: Pancrustacea
- Class: Insecta
- Order: Lepidoptera
- Family: Alucitidae
- Genus: Alucita
- Species: A. ussurica

Binomial name
- Alucita ussurica Ustjuzhanin, 1999

Species of many-plumed moth in genus Alucita

Alucita ussurica is a moth of the family Alucitidae. It is found in Russia (southern Primorie). The habitat consists of broad-leaved forests.

The wingspan is 10–13 mm. The ground colour of the adults is light-grey, with a pattern which is not contrasted. Adults have been recorded in June and July.
