= Alucita illuminatrix =

Scientific classification
- Kingdom: Animalia
- Phylum: Arthropoda
- Class: Insecta
- Order: Lepidoptera
- Family: Alucitidae
- Genus: Alucita
- Species: A. illuminatrix

Binomial name
- Alucita illuminatrix (Meyrick, 1929)

Synonyms
- Orneodes illuminatrix Meyrick, 1929

Species of many-plumed moth in genus Alucita

Alucita illuminatrix is a species of moth of the family Alucitidae. It is known from Cameroon.
