= Alucita ochriprota =

Scientific classification
- Kingdom: Animalia
- Phylum: Arthropoda
- Class: Insecta
- Order: Lepidoptera
- Family: Alucitidae
- Genus: Alucita
- Species: A. ochriprota

Binomial name
- Alucita ochriprota (Hering, 1917)

Synonyms
- Orneodes ochriprota Hering, 1917

Species of many-plumed moth in genus Alucita

Alucita ochriprota is a species of moth of the family Alucitidae. It is known from South Africa.
