= Alucita jujuyensis =

Scientific classification
- Kingdom: Animalia
- Phylum: Arthropoda
- Class: Insecta
- Order: Lepidoptera
- Family: Alucitidae
- Genus: Alucita
- Species: A. jujuyensis

Binomial name
- Alucita jujuyensis (Pastrana, 1954)

Synonyms
- Orneodes jujuyensis Pastrana, 1954

Species of many-plumed moth in genus Alucita

Alucita jujuyensis is a moth of the family Alucitidae. It is found in Argentina.
