= Alucita trachydesma =

Scientific classification
- Kingdom: Animalia
- Phylum: Arthropoda
- Class: Insecta
- Order: Lepidoptera
- Family: Alucitidae
- Genus: Alucita
- Species: A. trachydesma

Binomial name
- Alucita trachydesma (Meyrick, 1929)

Synonyms
- Orneodes trachydesma Meyrick, 1929

Species of many-plumed moth in genus Alucita

Alucita trachydesma is a moth of the family Alucitidae. It is found in Bolivia.
