= Alucita ordubadi =

Scientific classification
- Kingdom: Animalia
- Phylum: Arthropoda
- Class: Insecta
- Order: Lepidoptera
- Family: Alucitidae
- Genus: Alucita
- Species: A. ordubadi

Binomial name
- Alucita ordubadi Zagulajev, 2000

Species of many-plumed moth in genus Alucita

Alucita ordubadi is a moth of the family Alucitidae. It is found in Azerbaijan.
