= Alucita karadagica =

Scientific classification
- Kingdom: Animalia
- Phylum: Arthropoda
- Clade: Pancrustacea
- Class: Insecta
- Order: Lepidoptera
- Family: Alucitidae
- Genus: Alucita
- Species: A. karadagica

Binomial name
- Alucita karadagica Zagulajev, 2000

Species of many-plumed moth in genus Alucita

Alucita karadagica is a moth of the family Alucitidae. It is found in Ukraine.
