= Alucita semophantis =

Scientific classification
- Kingdom: Animalia
- Phylum: Arthropoda
- Class: Insecta
- Order: Lepidoptera
- Family: Alucitidae
- Genus: Alucita
- Species: A. semophantis

Binomial name
- Alucita semophantis (Meyrick, 1929)

Synonyms
- Orneodes semophantis Meyrick, 1929

Species of many-plumed moth in genus Alucita

Alucita semophantis is a moth of the family Alucitidae. It was described by Edward Meyrick in 1929. It is found in New Guinea.
