= Alucita philomela =

Scientific classification
- Kingdom: Animalia
- Phylum: Arthropoda
- Class: Insecta
- Order: Lepidoptera
- Family: Alucitidae
- Genus: Alucita
- Species: A. philomela

Binomial name
- Alucita philomela (Meyrick, 1937)

Synonyms
- Orneodes philomela Meyrick, 1937

Species of many-plumed moth in genus Alucita

Alucita philomela is a moth of the family Alucitidae. It is found in China (Yunnan).
