= Alucita ithycypha =

Scientific classification
- Kingdom: Animalia
- Phylum: Arthropoda
- Class: Insecta
- Order: Lepidoptera
- Family: Alucitidae
- Genus: Alucita
- Species: A. ithycypha

Binomial name
- Alucita ithycypha (Meyrick, 1927)

Synonyms
- Orneodes ithycypha Meyrick, 1927

Species of many-plumed moth in genus Alucita

Alucita ithycypha is a species of moth of the family Alucitidae. It is known from South Africa.
