= Alucita micrographa =

Scientific classification
- Kingdom: Animalia
- Phylum: Arthropoda
- Class: Insecta
- Order: Lepidoptera
- Family: Alucitidae
- Genus: Alucita
- Species: A. micrographa

Binomial name
- Alucita micrographa (Diakonoff, 1954)

Synonyms
- Orneodes micrographa Diakonoff, 1954

Species of many-plumed moth in genus Alucita

Alucita micrographa is a moth of the family Alucitidae. It was described by Alexey Diakonoff in 1954. It is found in New Guinea.
