= Alucita dohertyi =

Scientific classification
- Kingdom: Animalia
- Phylum: Arthropoda
- Class: Insecta
- Order: Lepidoptera
- Family: Alucitidae
- Genus: Alucita
- Species: A. dohertyi

Binomial name
- Alucita dohertyi (Walsingham, 1909)

Synonyms
- Orneodes dohertyi Walsingham, 1909; Alucita decaryella (Viette, 1956); Orneodes decaryella Viette, 1956

Species of many-plumed moth in genus Alucita

Alucita dohertyi is a species of moth of the family Alucitidae. It is known from Kenya, Madagascar, South Africa and Uganda.
