= Alucita major =

Scientific classification
- Kingdom: Animalia
- Phylum: Arthropoda
- Clade: Pancrustacea
- Class: Insecta
- Order: Lepidoptera
- Family: Alucitidae
- Genus: Alucita
- Species: A. major

Binomial name
- Alucita major (Rebel, 1906)

Synonyms
- Orneodes major Rebel, 1906

Species of many-plumed moth in genus Alucita

Alucita major is a moth of the family Alucitidae. It is found in Italy, Croatia, Romania, Bulgaria, North Macedonia, Greece and on Sardinia, Sicily and Crete. It has also been recorded from Turkey.
