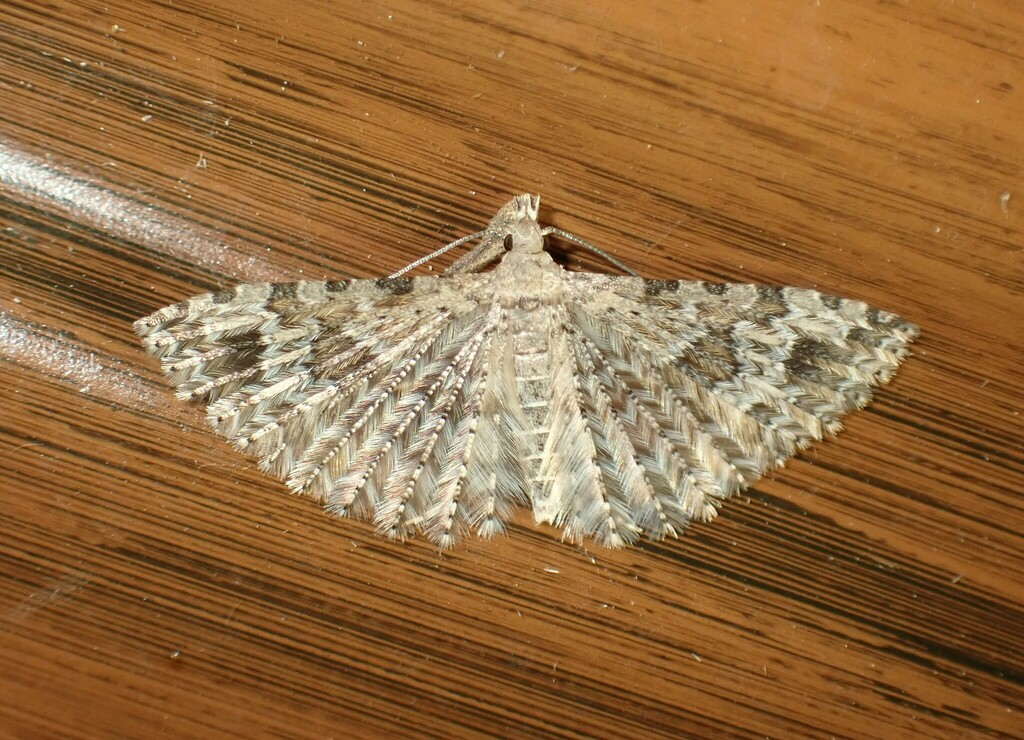

Scientific classification
- Kingdom: Animalia
- Phylum: Arthropoda
- Clade: Pancrustacea
- Class: Insecta
- Order: Lepidoptera
- Family: Alucitidae
- Genus: Alucita
- Species: A. adriendenisi

Binomial name
- Alucita adriendenisi B. Landry & J.-F. Landry, 2004

= Alucita adriendenisi =

Species of many-plumed moth in genus Alucita

Alucita adriendenisi is a moth of the family Alucitidae. It was described by Bernard Landry and Jean-François Landry in 2004. It is found in North America from New York west across Canada (including Alberta and British Columbia) with disjunct populations in western Texas and Arizona.

The length of the forewings 6.5–8 mm.

The larvae feed on Lonicera dioca.
