= Mulciber =

Mulciber may refer to:

- An alternate name for the Roman god Vulcan
- A fallen angel in John Milton's Paradise Lost
- Mulciber (beetle), a genus of longhorn beetles
- Mulciber (volcano), an extinct volcano in the Dutch part of the North Sea
- Alucita mulciber, a species of moth
- Euploea mulciber, a species of butterfly
