= Alucita riggii =

Scientific classification
- Kingdom: Animalia
- Phylum: Arthropoda
- Class: Insecta
- Order: Lepidoptera
- Family: Alucitidae
- Genus: Alucita
- Species: A. riggii

Binomial name
- Alucita riggii (Orfila, 1949)

Synonyms
- Orneodes riggii Orfila, 1949

Species of many-plumed moth in genus Alucita

Alucita riggii is a moth of the family Alucitidae. It is found in Argentina.
