= Alucita hofmanni =

Scientific classification
- Kingdom: Animalia
- Phylum: Arthropoda
- Class: Insecta
- Order: Lepidoptera
- Family: Alucitidae
- Genus: Alucita
- Species: A. hofmanni

Binomial name
- Alucita hofmanni (Pagenstecher, 1900)

Synonyms
- Orneodes hofmanni Pagenstecher, 1900

Species of many-plumed moth in genus Alucita

Alucita hofmanni is a moth of the family Alucitidae.

== Distribution ==
It is found on the Bismarck Archipelago.
