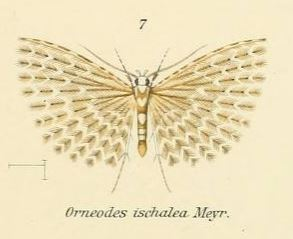

Scientific classification
- Kingdom: Animalia
- Phylum: Arthropoda
- Class: Insecta
- Order: Lepidoptera
- Family: Alucitidae
- Genus: Alucita
- Species: A. ischalea

Binomial name
- Alucita ischalea (Meyrick, 1905)

Synonyms
- Orneodes ischalea Meyrick, 1905

= Alucita ischalea =

Species of many-plumed moth in genus Alucita

Alucita ischalea is a moth of the family Alucitidae. It is found in Sri Lanka.

This species has a wingspan of 13mm.
