= Alucita fletcheriana =

Scientific classification
- Kingdom: Animalia
- Phylum: Arthropoda
- Class: Insecta
- Order: Lepidoptera
- Family: Alucitidae
- Genus: Alucita
- Species: A. fletcheriana

Binomial name
- Alucita fletcheriana (Ghesquière, 1940)

Synonyms
- Orneodes fletcheriana Ghesquière, 1940

Species of many-plumed moth in genus Alucita

Alucita fletcheriana is a species of moth of the family Alucitidae. It is known from the Democratic Republic of Congo.
