= Alucita zonodactyla =

Scientific classification
- Kingdom: Animalia
- Phylum: Arthropoda
- Clade: Pancrustacea
- Class: Insecta
- Order: Lepidoptera
- Family: Alucitidae
- Genus: Alucita
- Species: A. zonodactyla

Binomial name
- Alucita zonodactyla Zeller, 1847

Synonyms
- Orneodes zonodactyla var. eumorphodactyla Caradja, 1920

Species of many-plumed moth in genus Alucita

Alucita zonodactyla is a moth of the family Alucitidae. It is found in France, Spain, Italy, Croatia and Greece. It has also been recorded from Turkey and Russia.

The wingspan is 15–18 mm. Adults are on wing from late July to October in one generation per year.
