= Alucita cinnerethella =

Scientific classification
- Kingdom: Animalia
- Phylum: Arthropoda
- Class: Insecta
- Order: Lepidoptera
- Family: Alucitidae
- Genus: Alucita
- Species: A. cinnerethella

Binomial name
- Alucita cinnerethella (Amsel, 1935)

Synonyms
- Orneodes cinnerethella Amsel, 1935

Species of many-plumed moth in genus Alucita

Alucita cinnerethella is a moth of the family Alucitidae. It is found in Palestine.
