= Alucita zumkehri =

Scientific classification
- Kingdom: Animalia
- Phylum: Arthropoda
- Class: Insecta
- Order: Lepidoptera
- Family: Alucitidae
- Genus: Alucita
- Species: A. zumkehri

Binomial name
- Alucita zumkehri Gielis, 2009

Species of many-plumed moth in genus Alucita

Alucita zumkehri is a moth of the family Alucitidae. It was described by Cees Gielis in 2009. It is endemic to Papua New Guinea.
