= Alucita desmodactyla =

Scientific classification
- Kingdom: Animalia
- Phylum: Arthropoda
- Clade: Pancrustacea
- Class: Insecta
- Order: Lepidoptera
- Family: Alucitidae
- Genus: Alucita
- Species: A. desmodactyla

Binomial name
- Alucita desmodactyla Zeller, 1847

Synonyms
- Orneodes flavidactyla Toll, 1936

Species of many-plumed moth in genus Alucita

Alucita desmodactyla is a moth of the family Alucitidae. It is found in most of Europe, except Ireland, Great Britain, the Benelux, Portugal, Denmark, Fennoscandia, the Baltic region and most of the Balkan Peninsula. It has also been recorded from Armenia and Tunisia. The habitat ranges from slope steppes to fresh deciduous woodlands on altitudes between 90 and 600 meters.

Adults are on wing from the end July to early December and (after hibernation) from March to June.

The larvae feed on Stachys recta, the flowers of Stachys alpina and Stachys sylvatica.
