= Alucita atomoclasta =

Scientific classification
- Kingdom: Animalia
- Phylum: Arthropoda
- Class: Insecta
- Order: Lepidoptera
- Family: Alucitidae
- Genus: Alucita
- Species: A. atomoclasta

Binomial name
- Alucita atomoclasta (Meyrick, 1934)

Synonyms
- Orneodes atomoclasta Meyrick, 1934

Species of many-plumed moth in genus Alucita

Alucita atomoclasta is a species of moth of the family Alucitidae. It is known from São Tomé and Príncipe off the western equatorial coast of Central Africa.
