= Alucita compsoxantha =

Scientific classification
- Kingdom: Animalia
- Phylum: Arthropoda
- Class: Insecta
- Order: Lepidoptera
- Family: Alucitidae
- Genus: Alucita
- Species: A. compsoxantha

Binomial name
- Alucita compsoxantha (Meyrick, 1924)

Synonyms
- Orneodes compsoxantha Meyrick, 1924

Species of many-plumed moth in genus Alucita

Alucita compsoxantha is a species of moth of the family Alucitidae. It is found in Zimbabwe.
