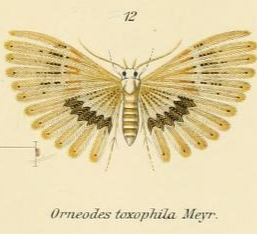

Scientific classification
- Kingdom: Animalia
- Phylum: Arthropoda
- Class: Insecta
- Order: Lepidoptera
- Family: Alucitidae
- Genus: Alucita
- Species: A. toxophila

Binomial name
- Alucita toxophila (Meyrick, 1906)

Synonyms
- Orneodes toxophila Meyrick, 1906

= Alucita toxophila =

Species of many-plumed moth in genus Alucita

Alucita toxophila is a moth of the family Alucitidae. It is found in Sri Lanka.
