= Alucita nephelotoxa =

Scientific classification
- Kingdom: Animalia
- Phylum: Arthropoda
- Class: Insecta
- Order: Lepidoptera
- Family: Alucitidae
- Genus: Alucita
- Species: A. nephelotoxa

Binomial name
- Alucita nephelotoxa (Meyrick, 1907)

Synonyms
- Orneodes nephelotoxa Meyrick, 1907

Species of many-plumed moth in genus Alucita

Alucita nephelotoxa is a moth of the family Alucitidae, which is found in India (Assam).
