= Alucita pepperella =

Scientific classification
- Kingdom: Animalia
- Phylum: Arthropoda
- Class: Insecta
- Order: Lepidoptera
- Family: Alucitidae
- Genus: Alucita
- Species: A. pepperella

Binomial name
- Alucita pepperella Whalley, 1962

Species of many-plumed moth in genus Alucita

Alucita pepperella is a moth of the family Alucitidae. It is found on Rennell Island.

It was first described by Paul Whalley in 1962.
