= Alucita acalles =

Scientific classification
- Kingdom: Animalia
- Phylum: Arthropoda
- Class: Insecta
- Order: Lepidoptera
- Family: Alucitidae
- Genus: Alucita
- Species: A. acalles

Binomial name
- Alucita acalles (Walsingham, 1915)

Synonyms
- Orneodes acalles Walsingham, 1915

Many-plumed moth species of genus Alucita

Alucita acalles is a moth in the family Alucitidae. It is found in Costa Rica.

The wingspan is about 16 mm. The antennae are pale whitish ochreous, slightly barred with brown toward the base. The head and thorax are whitish ochreous, sprinkled with brownish. The forewings are pale yellowish ochreous, dotted with white, and banded with dark brown fading into golden brown. The hindwings are paler than the forewings, the yellowish ochreous colour being reduced and the brownish bands almost faded-out.
