= Alucita capensis =

Scientific classification
- Kingdom: Animalia
- Phylum: Arthropoda
- Class: Insecta
- Order: Lepidoptera
- Family: Alucitidae
- Genus: Alucita
- Species: A. capensis

Binomial name
- Alucita capensis Felder & Rogenhofer, 1875

Species of many-plumed moth in genus Alucita

Alucita capensis is a species of moth of the family Alucitidae. It is known from South Africa.
