= Alucita homotrocha =

Scientific classification
- Kingdom: Animalia
- Phylum: Arthropoda
- Class: Insecta
- Order: Lepidoptera
- Family: Alucitidae
- Genus: Alucita
- Species: A. homotrocha

Binomial name
- Alucita homotrocha (Meyrick, 1921)

Synonyms
- Orneodes homotrocha Meyrick, 1921

Species of many-plumed moth in genus Alucita

Alucita homotrocha is a species of moth of the family Alucitidae. It is known from Zimbabwe.
