= Alucita libraria =

Scientific classification
- Kingdom: Animalia
- Phylum: Arthropoda
- Class: Insecta
- Order: Lepidoptera
- Family: Alucitidae
- Genus: Alucita
- Species: A. libraria

Binomial name
- Alucita libraria (Meyrick, 1911)

Synonyms
- Orneodes libraria Meyrick, 1911

Species of many-plumed moth in genus Alucita

Alucita libraria is a species of moth of the family Alucitidae. It is known from South Africa.
