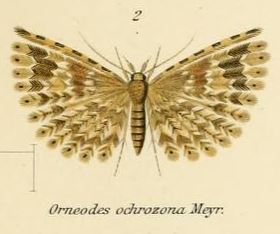

Scientific classification
- Kingdom: Animalia
- Phylum: Arthropoda
- Class: Insecta
- Order: Lepidoptera
- Family: Alucitidae
- Genus: Alucita
- Species: A. ochrozona

Binomial name
- Alucita ochrozona (Meyrick, 1910)

Synonyms
- Orneodes ochrozona Meyrick, 1910

= Alucita ochrozona =

Species of many-plumed moth in genus Alucita

Alucita ochrozona is a moth of the family Alucitidae. It is found in Bhutan.
