= Alucita idiocrossa =

Scientific classification
- Kingdom: Animalia
- Phylum: Arthropoda
- Class: Insecta
- Order: Lepidoptera
- Family: Alucitidae
- Genus: Alucita
- Species: A. idiocrossa

Binomial name
- Alucita idiocrossa (Meyrick, 1936)

Synonyms
- Orneodes idiocrossa Meyrick, 1936

Species of many-plumed moth in genus Alucita

Alucita idiocrossa is a moth of the family Alucitidae. It is found on Java.
