= Alucita kazachstanica =

Scientific classification
- Kingdom: Animalia
- Phylum: Arthropoda
- Clade: Pancrustacea
- Class: Insecta
- Order: Lepidoptera
- Family: Alucitidae
- Genus: Alucita
- Species: A. kazachstanica

Binomial name
- Alucita kazachstanica Gielis, 2003

Species of many-plumed moth in genus Alucita

Alucita kazachstanica is a moth of the family Alucitidae that is endemic to Kazakhstan.
