= Alucita bridarollii =

Scientific classification
- Kingdom: Animalia
- Phylum: Arthropoda
- Clade: Pancrustacea
- Class: Insecta
- Order: Lepidoptera
- Family: Alucitidae
- Genus: Alucita
- Species: A. bridarollii

Binomial name
- Alucita bridarollii (Pastrana, 1951)

Synonyms
- Orneodes bridarollii Pastrana, 1951

Species of many-plumed moth in genus Alucita

Alucita bridarollii is a moth of the family Alucitidae. It is found in Paraguay.
