= Alucita fumosa =

Scientific classification
- Kingdom: Animalia
- Phylum: Arthropoda
- Class: Insecta
- Order: Lepidoptera
- Family: Alucitidae
- Genus: Alucita
- Species: A. fumosa

Binomial name
- Alucita fumosa (Diakonoff, 1948)

Synonyms
- Orneodes fumosa Diakonoff, 1948

Species of many-plumed moth in genus Alucita

Alucita fumosa is a moth of the family Alucitidae. It is found on Buru.
