= Alucita nasuta =

Scientific classification
- Kingdom: Animalia
- Phylum: Arthropoda
- Class: Insecta
- Order: Lepidoptera
- Family: Alucitidae
- Genus: Alucita
- Species: A. nasuta

Binomial name
- Alucita nasuta Zeller, 1877

Synonyms
- Orneodes nasuta (Zeller, 1877)

Species of many-plumed moth in genus Alucita

Alucita nasuta is a moth in the family Alucitidae. It is found from Colombia north to Mexico.
