= Alucita danunciae =

Scientific classification
- Kingdom: Animalia
- Phylum: Arthropoda
- Class: Insecta
- Order: Lepidoptera
- Family: Alucitidae
- Genus: Alucita
- Species: A. danunciae

Binomial name
- Alucita danunciae Vargas, 2011

Species of many-plumed moth in genus Alucita

Alucita danunciae is a moth of the family Alucitidae. It was described by Héctor Vargas in 2011. It has been found in Chile and Peru.

The larvae feed on the seeds and fruit of Tecoma fulva fulva.
