= Alucita amalopis =

Scientific classification
- Kingdom: Animalia
- Phylum: Arthropoda
- Class: Insecta
- Order: Lepidoptera
- Family: Alucitidae
- Genus: Alucita
- Species: A. amalopis

Binomial name
- Alucita amalopis (Meyrick, 1927)

Synonyms
- Orneodes amalopis Meyrick, 1927

Species of many-plumed moth in genus Alucita

Alucita amalopis is a moth of the family Alucitidae. It is found on Samoa.
