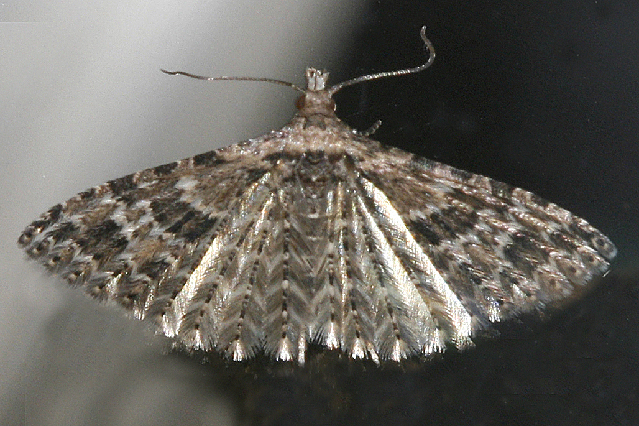

Scientific classification
- Kingdom: Animalia
- Phylum: Arthropoda
- Class: Insecta
- Order: Lepidoptera
- Family: Alucitidae
- Genus: Alucita
- Species: A. montana

Binomial name
- Alucita montana Barnes & Lindsey, 1921

Synonyms
- Alucita montana Cockerell, 1889 (nomen nudum); Orneodes montana Cockerell, 1889 (nomen nudum)

= Alucita montana =

Species of many-plumed moth in genus Alucita

Alucita montana, the Montana six-plume moth, is a moth of the family Alucitidae. It was described by William Barnes and Arthur Ward Lindsey in 1921. It is found in North America from south-western Quebec and Vermont, west to British Columbia and south to Arizona, California and Texas.

The wingspan is 11–16 mm (0.43–0.63 in). The forewings are crossed by a wide median band, margined narrowly with white, which forks on the first two lobes. There is another band nearer the base on the first lobe which is not distinctly marked elsewhere, and an additional subterminal band which is narrower on the first two lobes. Between this and the median band there is a heavy costal spot which does not reach the inner margin of the first lobe. All of these marks are margined with white. The ground color is grayish tawny and the marks are very dark brown, as are the tips of the lobes. The hindwings are checkered with dark brown, tawny and white.

The larvae feed on Symphoricarpos species in the northern part of the range and Lonicera species in California.
