= Alucita tandilensis =

Scientific classification
- Kingdom: Animalia
- Phylum: Arthropoda
- Class: Insecta
- Order: Lepidoptera
- Family: Alucitidae
- Genus: Alucita
- Species: A. tandilensis

Binomial name
- Alucita tandilensis (Pastrana, 1960)

Synonyms
- Orneodes tandilensis Pastrana, 1960

Species of many-plumed moth in genus Alucita

Alucita tandilensis is a moth of the family Alucitidae. It is found in Argentina.
