= Alucita beinongdai =

Scientific classification
- Kingdom: Animalia
- Phylum: Arthropoda
- Class: Insecta
- Order: Lepidoptera
- Family: Alucitidae
- Genus: Alucita
- Species: A. beinongdai

Binomial name
- Alucita beinongdai (Yang, 1977)

Synonyms
- Orneodes beinongdai Yang, 1977

Species of many-plumed moth in genus Alucita

Alucita beinongdai is a moth of the family Alucitidae. It is found in China.
