= Alucita panduris =

Scientific classification
- Kingdom: Animalia
- Phylum: Arthropoda
- Class: Insecta
- Order: Lepidoptera
- Family: Alucitidae
- Genus: Alucita
- Species: A. panduris

Binomial name
- Alucita panduris (Meyrick, 1911)

Synonyms
- Orneodes panduris Meyrick, 1911

Species of many-plumed moth in genus Alucita

Alucita panduris is a moth of the family Alucitidae. It is found in southern India.
