= Alucita nannodactyla =

Scientific classification
- Kingdom: Animalia
- Phylum: Arthropoda
- Clade: Pancrustacea
- Class: Insecta
- Order: Lepidoptera
- Family: Alucitidae
- Genus: Alucita
- Species: A. nannodactyla

Binomial name
- Alucita nannodactyla (Rebel, 1907)

Synonyms
- Orneodes nannodactyla Rebel, 1907

Species of many-plumed moth in genus Alucita

Alucita nannodactyla is a species of moth of the family Alucitidae. It is known from Socotra, Yemen.
