= Alucita microscopica =

Scientific classification
- Kingdom: Animalia
- Phylum: Arthropoda
- Class: Insecta
- Order: Lepidoptera
- Family: Alucitidae
- Genus: Alucita
- Species: A. microscopica

Binomial name
- Alucita microscopica (T. B. Fletcher, 1910)

Synonyms
- Orneodes microscopica T. B. Fletcher, 1910

Species of many-plumed moth in genus Alucita

Alucita microscopica is a moth of the family Alucitidae. It was first described by Thomas Bainbrigge Fletcher in 1910 and is found in Sri Lanka.
