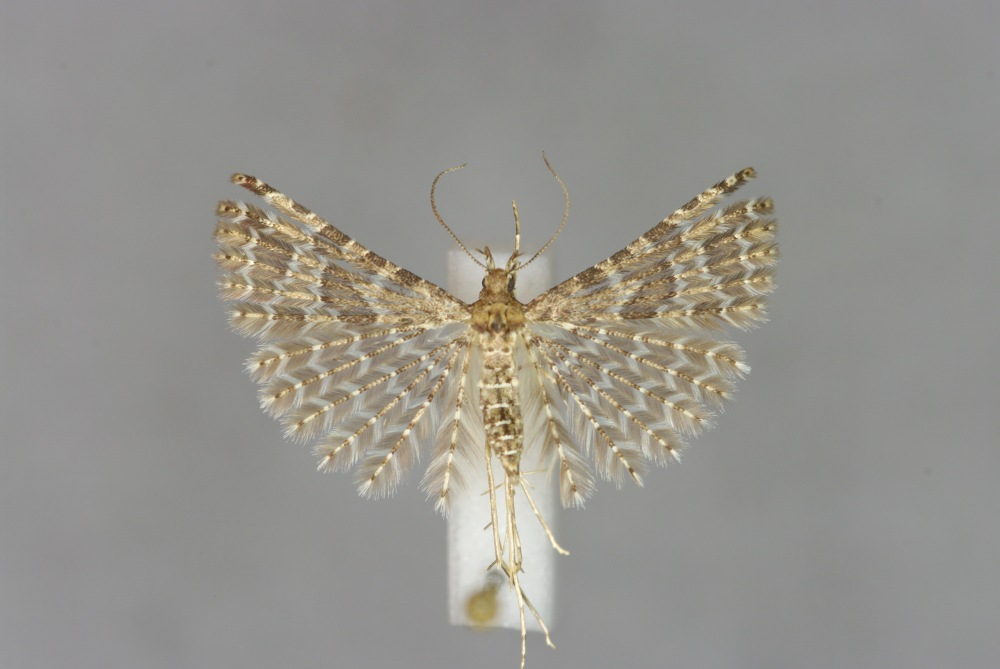

Scientific classification
- Kingdom: Animalia
- Phylum: Arthropoda
- Clade: Pancrustacea
- Class: Insecta
- Order: Lepidoptera
- Family: Alucitidae
- Genus: Alucita
- Species: A. huebneri

Binomial name
- Alucita huebneri Wallengren, 1859

Synonyms
- Alucita caucasica Zagulajev, 1986

= Alucita huebneri =

Species of many-plumed moth in genus Alucita

Alucita huebneri is a moth of the family Alucitidae. It is found in most of Europe, except Ireland, Great Britain, the Benelux, Fennoscandia, Latvia, the Baltic region, Ukraine and Slovenia. The habitat consists of mesotrophic meadows, colline and montane hay meadows on altitudes between 200 and 400 metres.

The wingspan is about 15 mm. Adults are on wing from May to June and in September.

The larvae feed on Scabiosa, Centaurea and Knautia species. They live within the flowers and on seeds of their host plant.
