= Alucita bidentata =

Scientific classification
- Kingdom: Animalia
- Phylum: Arthropoda
- Clade: Pancrustacea
- Class: Insecta
- Order: Lepidoptera
- Family: Alucitidae
- Genus: Alucita
- Species: A. bidentata

Binomial name
- Alucita bidentata Scholz & Jackh, 1994

Species of many-plumed moth in genus Alucita

Alucita bidentata is a moth of the family Alucitidae. It is found in France, Italy, Croatia, Bosnia and Herzegovina, North Macedonia and on Sardinia.
