= Alucita cancellata =

Scientific classification
- Kingdom: Animalia
- Phylum: Arthropoda
- Clade: Pancrustacea
- Class: Insecta
- Order: Lepidoptera
- Family: Alucitidae
- Genus: Alucita
- Species: A. cancellata

Binomial name
- Alucita cancellata (Meyrick, 1908)

Synonyms
- Orneodes cancellata Meyrick, 1908

Species of many-plumed moth in genus Alucita

Alucita cancellata is a moth of the family Alucitidae. It is found in France, Spain, Italy, Croatia, Romania and the Republic of Macedonia. It was first described from Syria and is further known from Iran, Israel, Turkey and Russia.

The wingspan is 15–16 mm. The forewings are white, with four subquadrate fuscous spots edged with black on the anterior half of the costa. The hindwings are white, the basal area ochreous tinged and spotted with dark fuscous.
