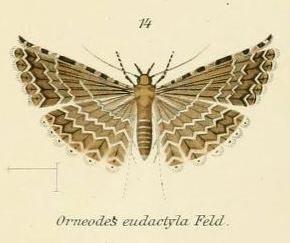

Scientific classification
- Kingdom: Animalia
- Phylum: Arthropoda
- Class: Insecta
- Order: Lepidoptera
- Family: Alucitidae
- Genus: Alucita
- Species: A. eudactyla

Binomial name
- Alucita eudactyla (Felder, 1875)

Synonyms
- Orneodes eudactyla Felder, 1875

= Alucita eudactyla =

Species of many-plumed moth in genus Alucita

Alucita eudactyla is a moth of the family Alucitidae. It is found in Colombia, Brazil and the Antilles.
