= Alucita flavicincta =

Scientific classification
- Kingdom: Animalia
- Phylum: Arthropoda
- Class: Insecta
- Order: Lepidoptera
- Family: Alucitidae
- Genus: Alucita
- Species: A. flavicincta

Binomial name
- Alucita flavicincta (Walsingham, 1915)

Synonyms
- Orneodes flavicincta Walsingham, 1915

Species of many-plumed moth in genus Alucita

Alucita flavicincta is a moth in the family Alucitidae. It is found in Mexico and has also been recorded from Jamaica in the West Indies.

The wingspan is 10–11 mm. The antennae are pale cinereous (ash-grey), barred with greyish fuscous above. The head is pale cinereous, with two narrow transverse fuscous bars and the thorax is pale cinereous, speckled with fuscous. The fore- and hindwings are pale cinereous, with fuscous and some blackish speckling. The wings are marked with greyish fuscous bands, more or less outlined with whitish cinereous specks, but between them the intermediate space is occupied by a pale yellow ochreous band, more clearly defined on the fore- than on the hindwings. There is also a narrower stripe of the same colour beyond the outer fuscous band.
