= Alucita anticoma =

Scientific classification
- Kingdom: Animalia
- Phylum: Arthropoda
- Class: Insecta
- Order: Lepidoptera
- Family: Alucitidae
- Genus: Alucita
- Species: A. anticoma

Binomial name
- Alucita anticoma (Meyrick, 1929)

Synonyms
- Orneodes anticoma Meyrick, 1929

Species of many-plumed moth in genus Alucita

Alucita anticoma is a moth in the family Alucitidae. It is found in New Guinea.

This species belongs to a group of species with white forewings and has a wingspan of 17mm.
