= Alucita flavofascia =

Scientific classification
- Kingdom: Animalia
- Phylum: Arthropoda
- Class: Insecta
- Order: Lepidoptera
- Family: Alucitidae
- Genus: Alucita
- Species: A. flavofascia

Binomial name
- Alucita flavofascia (Inoue, 1956)

Synonyms
- Orneodes flavofascia Inoue, 1956

Species of many-plumed moth in genus Alucita

Alucita flavofascia is a moth of the family Alucitidae. It is found in Japan.
