= Alucita loxoschista =

Scientific classification
- Kingdom: Animalia
- Phylum: Arthropoda
- Class: Insecta
- Order: Lepidoptera
- Family: Alucitidae
- Genus: Alucita
- Species: A. loxoschista

Binomial name
- Alucita loxoschista (Meyrick, 1931)

Synonyms
- Orneodes loxoschista Meyrick, 1931

Species of many-plumed moth in genus Alucita

Alucita loxoschista is a species of moth of the family Alucitidae. It is known from Uganda.
