= Alucita sertifera =

Scientific classification
- Kingdom: Animalia
- Phylum: Arthropoda
- Class: Insecta
- Order: Lepidoptera
- Family: Alucitidae
- Genus: Alucita
- Species: A. sertifera

Binomial name
- Alucita sertifera (Meyrick, 1921)

Synonyms
- Orneodes sertifera Meyrick, 1921

Species of many-plumed moth in genus Alucita

Alucita sertifera is a species of moth of the family Alucitidae. It is known from the Republic of Congo.
