= A. maxima =

A. maxima may refer to:

- Aerodramus maxima, a cave-nesting swift
- Alcadia maxima, a land snail
- Alucita maxima, a Libyan moth
- Anatoma maxima, a sea snail
- Apamea maxima, a moth native to western North America
- Architectonica maxima, a staircase shell
- Archontophoenix maxima, a palm endemic to Queensland
- Argonauta maxima, a pelagic octopus
- Aristolochia maxima, a New World plant
- Arthrospira maxima, a filamentous cyanobacterion
- Astrantia maxima, a perennial plant
- Atoposea maxima, a Colombian moth
