= Alucita straminea =

Scientific classification
- Kingdom: Animalia
- Phylum: Arthropoda
- Class: Insecta
- Order: Lepidoptera
- Family: Alucitidae
- Genus: Alucita
- Species: A. straminea

Binomial name
- Alucita straminea Hashimoto, 1984

Species of many-plumed moth in genus Alucita

Alucita straminea is a moth of the family Alucitidae. It is found in Japan.
