= Alucita synnephodactyla =

Scientific classification
- Kingdom: Animalia
- Phylum: Arthropoda
- Class: Insecta
- Order: Lepidoptera
- Family: Alucitidae
- Genus: Alucita
- Species: A. synnephodactyla

Binomial name
- Alucita synnephodactyla (Alphéraky, 1876)

Synonyms
- Orneodes synnephodactyla Alphéraky, 1876

Species of many-plumed moth in genus Alucita

Alucita synnephodactyla is a moth of the family Alucitidae. It is found in the Caucasus.
