= Alucita ectomesa =

Scientific classification
- Kingdom: Animalia
- Phylum: Arthropoda
- Clade: Pancrustacea
- Class: Insecta
- Order: Lepidoptera
- Family: Alucitidae
- Genus: Alucita
- Species: A. ectomesa

Binomial name
- Alucita ectomesa (Hering, 1917)

Synonyms
- Orneodes ectomesa Hering, 1917

Species of many-plumed moth in genus Alucita

Alucita ectomesa is a species of moth of the family Alucitidae. It is native to Tanzania.
