= Alucita baihua =

Scientific classification
- Kingdom: Animalia
- Phylum: Arthropoda
- Class: Insecta
- Order: Lepidoptera
- Family: Alucitidae
- Genus: Alucita
- Species: A. baihua

Binomial name
- Alucita baihua (Yang, 1977)

Synonyms
- Orneodes baihua Yang, 1977

Species of many-plumed moth in genus Alucita

Alucita baihua is a moth of the family Alucitidae. It is found in China.
