= Alucita palodactyla =

Scientific classification
- Kingdom: Animalia
- Phylum: Arthropoda
- Clade: Pancrustacea
- Class: Insecta
- Order: Lepidoptera
- Family: Alucitidae
- Genus: Alucita
- Species: A. palodactyla

Binomial name
- Alucita palodactyla Zeller, 1847

Synonyms
- Orneodes parthenodactyla Chretien, 1915; Alucita perritodactyla Staudinger, 1859

Species of many-plumed moth in genus Alucita

Alucita palodactyla is a moth of the family Alucitidae. It is found in Germany, France, Spain, Portugal, Italy, the Republic of Macedonia, Turkey, Hungary and Iran.

Adults are on wing adults in May and from July to September, probably in two generations per year.

The larvae feed on Scabiosa rutaefolia. They live within the flowers and on seeds of their host plant.
