= Alucita seychellensis =

Scientific classification
- Kingdom: Animalia
- Phylum: Arthropoda
- Class: Insecta
- Order: Lepidoptera
- Family: Alucitidae
- Genus: Alucita
- Species: A. seychellensis

Binomial name
- Alucita seychellensis (T. B. Fletcher, 1910)

Synonyms
- Orneodes seychellensis T. B. Fletcher, 1910

Species of many-plumed moth in genus Alucita

Alucita seychellensis is a species of moth of the family Alucitidae described by Thomas Bainbrigge Fletcher in 1910. It is known from the Seychelles in the Indian Ocean.
