= Alucita photaula =

Scientific classification
- Kingdom: Animalia
- Phylum: Arthropoda
- Class: Insecta
- Order: Lepidoptera
- Family: Alucitidae
- Genus: Alucita
- Species: A. photaula

Binomial name
- Alucita photaula (Meyrick, 1918)

Synonyms
- Orneodes photaula Meyrick, 1918

Species of many-plumed moth in genus Alucita

Alucita photaula is a species of moth of the family Alucitidae. It is known from South Africa.
