= Alucita pseudohuebneri =

Scientific classification
- Kingdom: Animalia
- Phylum: Arthropoda
- Class: Insecta
- Order: Lepidoptera
- Family: Alucitidae
- Genus: Alucita
- Species: A. pseudohuebneri

Binomial name
- Alucita pseudohuebneri Scholz, 1997

Species of many-plumed moth in genus Alucita

Alucita pseudohuebneri is a moth of the family Alucitidae. It is found in Turkey and Iran.
