= Alucita lalannei =

Scientific classification
- Kingdom: Animalia
- Phylum: Arthropoda
- Clade: Pancrustacea
- Class: Insecta
- Order: Lepidoptera
- Family: Alucitidae
- Genus: Alucita
- Species: A. lalannei

Binomial name
- Alucita lalannei B. Landry & J.-F. Landry, 2004

Species of many-plumed moth in genus Alucita

Alucita lalannei is a moth of the family Alucitidae. It was described by Bernard Landry and Jean-François Landry in 2004. It is found in the Canadian provinces of Ontario, Manitoba and Alberta.
