= Alucita isodina =

Scientific classification
- Kingdom: Animalia
- Phylum: Arthropoda
- Class: Insecta
- Order: Lepidoptera
- Family: Alucitidae
- Genus: Alucita
- Species: A. isodina

Binomial name
- Alucita isodina (Meyrick, 1920)

Synonyms
- Orneodes isodina Meyrick, 1920

Species of many-plumed moth in genus Alucita

Alucita isodina is a species of moth of the family Alucitidae. It is known from Tanzania.
