= Alucita melanodactyla =

Scientific classification
- Kingdom: Animalia
- Phylum: Arthropoda
- Class: Insecta
- Order: Lepidoptera
- Family: Alucitidae
- Genus: Alucita
- Species: A. melanodactyla

Binomial name
- Alucita melanodactyla Legrand, 1966

Species of many-plumed moth in genus Alucita

Alucita melanodactyla is a species of moth of the family Alucitidae. It is known from the Seychelles.
