= Alucita dejongi =

Scientific classification
- Kingdom: Animalia
- Phylum: Arthropoda
- Class: Insecta
- Order: Lepidoptera
- Family: Alucitidae
- Genus: Alucita
- Species: A. dejongi

Binomial name
- Alucita dejongi Gielis, 2009

Species of many-plumed moth in genus Alucita

Alucita dejongi is a moth of the family Alucitidae. It was described by Cees Gielis in 2009. It is found in Papua New Guinea.

This species belongs to a group of species with white forewings and has a wingspan of 9 mm.
