= Alucita japonica =

Scientific classification
- Kingdom: Animalia
- Phylum: Arthropoda
- Class: Insecta
- Order: Lepidoptera
- Family: Alucitidae
- Genus: Alucita
- Species: A. japonica

Binomial name
- Alucita japonica (Matsumura, 1931)

Synonyms
- Orneodes japonica Matsumura, 1931

Species of many-plumed moth in genus Alucita

Alucita japonica is a moth of the family Alucitidae. It is found in Japan.
