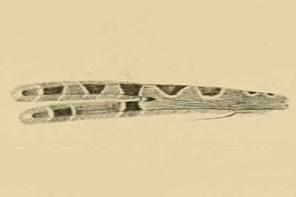
- Detail of a "plume" of the wing

Scientific classification
- Kingdom: Animalia
- Phylum: Arthropoda
- Clade: Pancrustacea
- Class: Insecta
- Order: Lepidoptera
- Family: Alucitidae
- Genus: Alucita
- Species: A. grammodactyla

Binomial name
- Alucita grammodactyla Zeller, 1841

= Alucita grammodactyla =

Species of many-plumed moth in genus Alucita

Alucita grammodactyla is a moth of the family Alucitidae. It is found in most of Europe, except Ireland, Great Britain, Portugal, Norway, Finland, Latvia, Lithuania, Ukraine, Slovenia and Greece. It is also present in Turkey.

The wingspan 14–17 mm for males and females. Adults are on wing from April to September. Adults are on wing from July to early September and again (after hibernation) until early June.
