= Alucita hypocosma =

Scientific classification
- Kingdom: Animalia
- Phylum: Arthropoda
- Class: Insecta
- Order: Lepidoptera
- Family: Alucitidae
- Genus: Alucita
- Species: A. hypocosma

Binomial name
- Alucita hypocosma (Meyrick, 1934)

Synonyms
- Orneodes hypocosma Meyrick, 1934

Species of many-plumed moth in genus Alucita

Alucita hypocosma is a moth of the family Alucitidae. It is found in north-eastern China.
