= Alucita montigena =

Scientific classification
- Kingdom: Animalia
- Phylum: Arthropoda
- Class: Insecta
- Order: Lepidoptera
- Family: Alucitidae
- Genus: Alucita
- Species: A. montigena

Binomial name
- Alucita montigena (T. B. Fletcher, 1910)

Synonyms
- Orneodes montigena T. B. Fletcher, 1910

Species of many-plumed moth in genus Alucita

Alucita montigena is a moth of the family Alucitidae. It was described by Thomas Bainbrigge Fletcher in 1910 and is found in Sri Lanka.
