= Alucita postfasciata =

Scientific classification
- Kingdom: Animalia
- Phylum: Arthropoda
- Class: Insecta
- Order: Lepidoptera
- Family: Alucitidae
- Genus: Alucita
- Species: A. postfasciata

Binomial name
- Alucita postfasciata T. B. Fletcher, 1910

Species of many-plumed moth in genus Alucita

Alucita postfasciata is a moth of the family Alucitidae. It is found in Sri Lanka.
