= Alucita molliflua =

Scientific classification
- Kingdom: Animalia
- Phylum: Arthropoda
- Clade: Pancrustacea
- Class: Insecta
- Order: Lepidoptera
- Family: Alucitidae
- Genus: Alucita
- Species: A. molliflua

Binomial name
- Alucita molliflua (Meyrick, 1927)

Synonyms
- Orneodes molliflua Meyrick, 1927

Species of many-plumed moth in genus Alucita

Alucita molliflua is a species of moth of the family Alucitidae. It is known from Uganda.
