= Alucita rhaptica =

Scientific classification
- Kingdom: Animalia
- Phylum: Arthropoda
- Class: Insecta
- Order: Lepidoptera
- Family: Alucitidae
- Genus: Alucita
- Species: A. rhaptica

Binomial name
- Alucita rhaptica (Meyrick, 1920)

Synonyms
- Orneodes rhaptica Meyrick, 1920

Species of many-plumed moth in genus Alucita

Alucita rhaptica is a moth of the family Alucitidae. It is found in eastern Africa.
