= Alinguata =

Scientific classification
- Kingdom: Animalia
- Phylum: Arthropoda
- Class: Insecta
- Order: Lepidoptera
- Family: Alucitidae
- Genus: Alinguata; Fleming, 1948
- Species: A. neblina

Binomial name
- Alinguata neblina Fleming, 1948

Genus of moths

Alinguata is a genus of moths in the family Alucitidae containing only one species Alinguata neblina, which is found in Venezuela.
