= Phalaena =

Obsolete name for a genus of moths

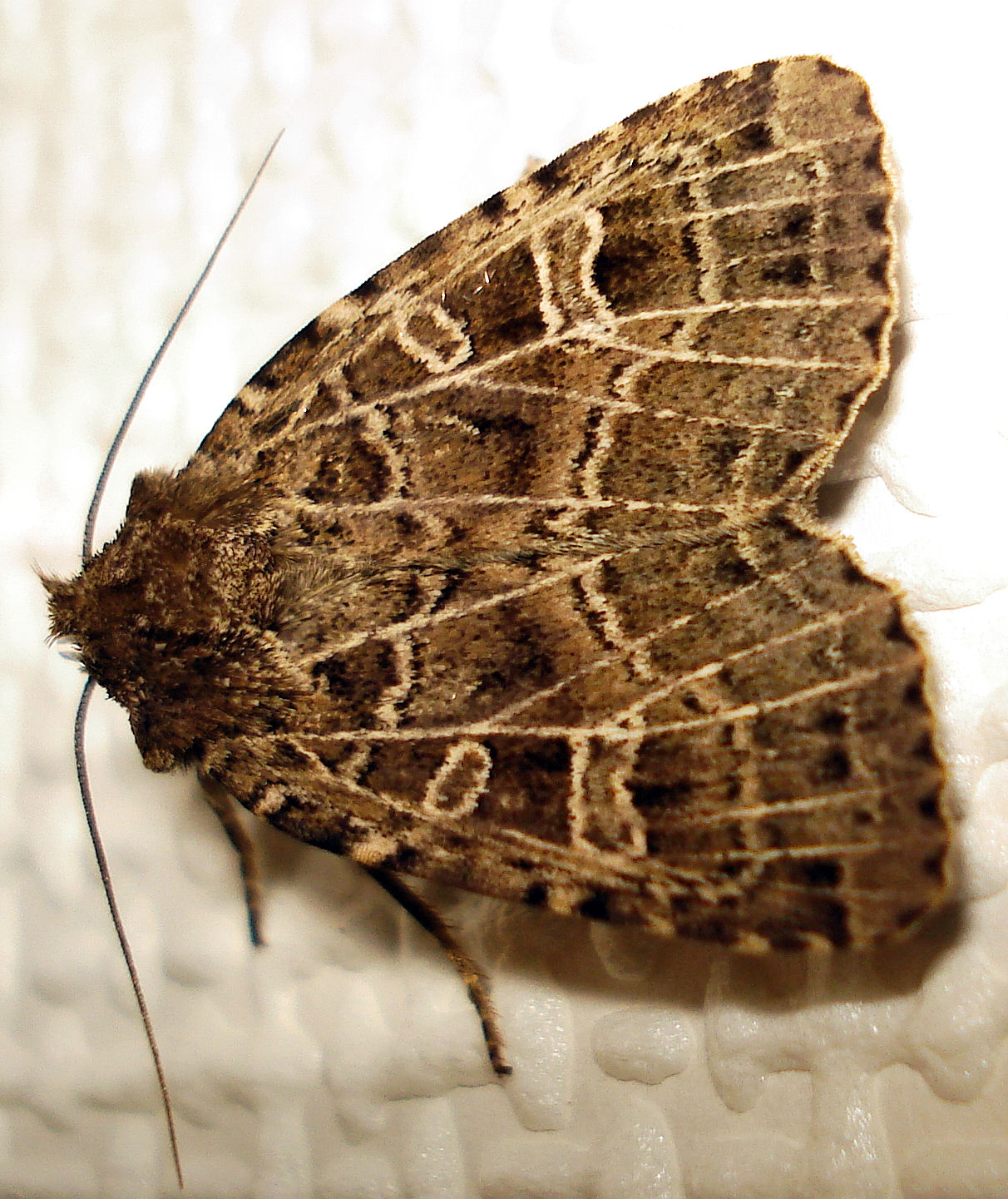
The Gothic moth, Naenia typica (formerly Phalaena typica) was the type species of Linnaeus' genus Phalaena.

Phalaena is an obsolete genus of Lepidoptera used by Carl Linnaeus to house most moths.

Phalaena was one of three genera used by Linnaeus to cover all Lepidoptera. Papilio included all butterflies at that time, Sphinx included all hawk moths, and Phalaena included all the remaining moths. The type species was Phalaena typica (now Naenia typica in the family Noctuidae).

Phalaena has been declared a nomen rejiciendum by the International Commission on Zoological Nomenclature, for the purposes of priority, but not homonymy. Seven subgenera were raised to the rank of genus as follows:

- Alucita Linnaeus, 1767 – Alucitidae
- Attacus Linnaeus, 1767 – Saturniidae
- Bombyx Linnaeus, 1758 – Bombycidae
- Geometra Linnaeus, 1758 – Geometridae
- Noctua Linnaeus, 1758 – Noctuidae
- Pyralis Linnaeus, 1758 – Pyralidae
- Tinea Linnaeus, 1758 – Tineidae
- Tortrix Linnaeus, 1758 – Tortricidae
