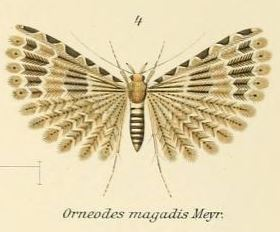

Scientific classification
- Kingdom: Animalia
- Phylum: Arthropoda
- Class: Insecta
- Order: Lepidoptera
- Family: Alucitidae
- Genus: Alucita
- Species: A. magadis

Binomial name
- Alucita magadis (Meyrick, 1907)

Synonyms
- Orneodes magadis Meyrick, 1907

= Alucita magadis =

Species of many-plumed moth in genus Alucita

Alucita magadis is a moth of the family Alucitidae. It is found in India (Assam).
