= Alucita anemolia =

Scientific classification
- Kingdom: Animalia
- Phylum: Arthropoda
- Class: Insecta
- Order: Lepidoptera
- Family: Alucitidae
- Genus: Alucita
- Species: A. anemolia

Binomial name
- Alucita anemolia (Meyrick, 1929)

Synonyms
- Orneodes anemolia Meyrick, 1929

Species of many-plumed moth in genus Alucita

Alucita anemolia is a moth of the family Alucitidae. It is found in India (Madras).
