= Hebdomactis =

Scientific classification
- Kingdom: Animalia
- Phylum: Arthropoda
- Class: Insecta
- Order: Lepidoptera
- Family: Alucitidae
- Genus: Hebdomactis; Meyrick, 1929
- Species: H. crystallodes

Binomial name
- Hebdomactis crystallodes Meyrick, 1929

Genus of moths

Hebdomactis is a genus of moths in the family Alucitidae. It was described by Edward Meyrick in 1929, and contains the single species Hebdomactis crystallodes. It is found in New Guinea.
