= Alucita mulciber =

Scientific classification
- Kingdom: Animalia
- Phylum: Arthropoda
- Class: Insecta
- Order: Lepidoptera
- Family: Alucitidae
- Genus: Alucita
- Species: A. mulciber

Binomial name
- Alucita mulciber (Meyrick, 1932)

Synonyms
- Orneodes mulciber Meyrick, 1932

Species of many-plumed moth in genus Alucita

Alucita mulciber is a moth of the family Alucitidae. It is found in Costa Rica.
