= Alucita maxima =

Scientific classification
- Kingdom: Animalia
- Phylum: Arthropoda
- Class: Insecta
- Order: Lepidoptera
- Family: Alucitidae
- Genus: Alucita
- Species: A. maxima

Binomial name
- Alucita maxima (Turati, 1924)

Synonyms
- Orneodes maxima Turati, 1924

Species of many-plumed moth in genus Alucita

Alucita maxima is a moth of the family Alucitidae. It is found in Libya.
