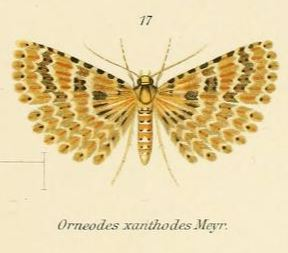

Scientific classification
- Kingdom: Animalia
- Phylum: Arthropoda
- Class: Insecta
- Order: Lepidoptera
- Family: Alucitidae
- Genus: Alucita
- Species: A. xanthodes

Binomial name
- Alucita xanthodes Meyrick, 1890

Synonyms
- Orneodes xanthodes Meyrick

= Alucita xanthodes =

Species of many-plumed moth in genus Alucita

Alucita xanthodes is a species of moth of the family Alucitidae. It is found in Queensland, Australia.
