= Prymnotomis =

Scientific classification
- Kingdom: Animalia
- Phylum: Arthropoda
- Clade: Pancrustacea
- Class: Insecta
- Order: Lepidoptera
- Family: Alucitidae
- Genus: Prymnotomis; Meyrick, 1931

Genus of moths

Prymnotomis is a genus of moths in the family Alucitidae. It was described by Edward Meyrick in 1931, and for many years only contained one species Prymnotomis crypsicroca found in Brazil described from specimens collected in Espirito Santo.

== Species ==
- Prymnotomis cecidicola Moreira et al, 2019
- Prymnotomis crypsicroca Meyrick, 1931
- Prymnotomis saopauloana Heppner, Kovtunovich & Ustjuzhanin, 2024
