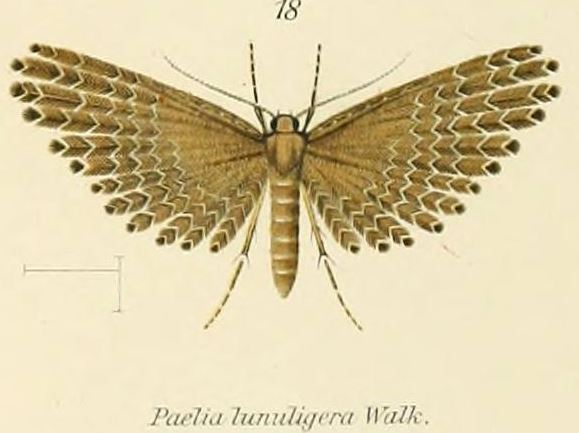

Scientific classification
- Kingdom: Animalia
- Phylum: Arthropoda
- Class: Insecta
- Order: Lepidoptera
- Family: Alucitidae
- Genus: Paelia; Walker, 1866
- Species: P. lunuligera

Binomial name
- Paelia lunuligera Walker, 1866

= Paelia =

Genus of moths

Paelia is a monotypic moth genus in the family Alucitidae described by Francis Walker in 1866. Its single species, Paelia lunuligera, described by the same author in the same year, is found in Brazil and Guyana.
