= Alucita agapeta =

Scientific classification
- Kingdom: Animalia
- Phylum: Arthropoda
- Class: Insecta
- Order: Lepidoptera
- Family: Alucitidae
- Genus: Alucita
- Species: A. agapeta

Binomial name
- Alucita agapeta (Turner, 1913)

Synonyms
- Orneodes agapeta Turner, 1913

Species of many-plumed moth in genus Alucita

Alucita agapeta is a species of moth of the family Alucitidae. It is found in Australia.
