= Alucita triscausta =

Scientific classification
- Kingdom: Animalia
- Phylum: Arthropoda
- Class: Insecta
- Order: Lepidoptera
- Family: Alucitidae
- Genus: Alucita
- Species: A. triscausta

Binomial name
- Alucita triscausta (Meyrick, 1907)

Synonyms
- Orneodes triscausta Meyrick, 1907

Species of many-plumed moth in genus Alucita

Alucita triscausta is a moth of the family Alucitidae. It is found in India (Assam).
