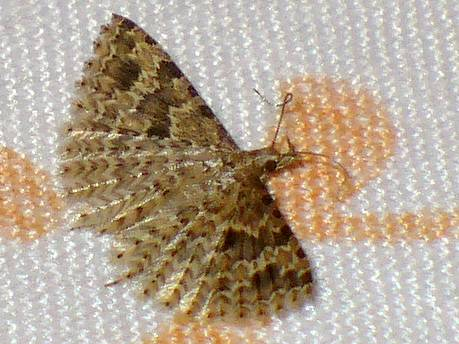
- Twenty-plume moth (A. hexadactyla) imago

Scientific classification
- Kingdom: Animalia
- Phylum: Arthropoda
- Clade: Pancrustacea
- Class: Insecta
- Order: Lepidoptera
- Family: Alucitidae
- Genus: Alucita; Linnaeus, 1758

Type species
- Alucita hexadactyla Linnaeus, 1758

Synonyms
- Aleucita (lapsus); Allucita (lapsus); Alucitina Heydenreich, 1851 (Note: Some cite Zeller, 1841 as author; this is incorrect, as Zeller's "Alucitina" is a junior synonym of the family Alucitidae, not the genus Alucita.); Euchiradia Hübner, 1826; Orneodes Latreille, 1796; Orneodus (lapsus); Rhipidophora Hübner, 1822

= Alucita =

Largest genus of the many-plumed moths (Alucitidae)

Alucita is the largest genus of many-plumed moths (family Alucitidae); it is also the type genus of its family and the disputed superfamily Alucitoidea. This genus occurs almost worldwide and contains about 180 species as of 2011; new species are still being described and discovered regularly. Formerly, many similar moths of superfamilies Alucitoidea, Copromorphoidea and Pterophoroidea were also placed in Alucita.

The genus Alucita was established by Carl Linnaeus in the 1758 10th edition of Systema Naturae as a subgenus of Phalaena, Linné's "wastebin genus" for moths. Johan Christian Fabricius in 1775 seems to have been the first author to consider Alucita a genus in its own right, and it remains so until today. However, some subsequent authors believed Linnaeus' name to be invalid, and established alternative names for this genus, but, while the oldest of these, Pierre André Latreille's Orneodes, was used instead of Alucita for a long time, all these subsequent names are today recognized as junior synonyms.

== Species ==
The species of Alucita include:

- Alucita abenahoensis
- Alucita acalles
- Alucita acalyptra
- Alucita acascaea
- Alucita acutata Scholz & Jackh, 1994
- Alucita adriendenisi B.Landry & J.-F.Landry, 2004
- Alucita adzharica
- Alucita agapeta
- Alucita amalopis
- Alucita ancalopa
- Alucita anemolia
- Alucita angustestriata
- Alucita anticoma
- Alucita aramsolkiensis Gielis, 2009
- Alucita araxella
- Alucita argyrospodia (Diakonoff, 1954)
- Alucita arriguttii
- Alucita atomoclasta
- Alucita baihua
- Alucita baliochlora (Meyrick, 1929)
- Alucita balioxantha
- Alucita beinongdai
- Alucita bidentata Scholz & Jackh, 1994
- Alucita brachyphimus (Hering, 1917)
- Alucita brachyzona
- Alucita bridarollii
- Alucita brunnea
- Alucita budashkini Zagulajev, 2000
- Alucita bulgaria Zagulajev, 2000
- Alucita butleri
- Alucita canariensis Scholz & Jackh, 1994
- Alucita cancellata (Meyrick, 1908)
- Alucita capensis
- Alucita caucasica
- Alucita certifica
- Alucita chloracta
- Alucita cinnerethella
- Alucita coffeina
- Alucita compsoxantha
- Alucita crococyma
- Alucita cyanophanes
- Alucita cymatodactyla Zeller, 1852
- Alucita cymographa (Meyrick, 1929)
- Alucita danunciae Vargas, 2011
- Alucita debilella Scholz & Jackh, 1994
- Alucita deboeri Gielis, 2009
- Alucita decaryella
- Alucita dejongi Gielis, 2009
- Alucita desmodactyla Zeller, 1847
- Alucita devosi Gielis, 2009
- Alucita dohertyi
- Alucita ectomesa
- Alucita entoprocta
- Alucita erzayi Ustjuzhanin & Kovtunovich, 2024
- Alucita eteoxantha (Meyrick, 1929)
- Alucita eudactyla
- Alucita eudasys (Diakonoff, 1954)
- Alucita eumorphodactyla
- Alucita eurynephela (Meyrick, 1929)
- Alucita euscripta
- Alucita fako Ustjuzhanin & Kovtunovich, 2024
- Alucita ferruginea
- Alucita flavicincta
- Alucita flaviserta
- Alucita flavofascia
- Alucita fletcheriana
- Alucita fumosa
- Alucita grammodactyla Zeller, 1841
- Alucita granata
- Alucita habrophila
- Alucita helena
- Alucita hemicyclus
- Alucita hexadactyla – twenty-plume moth
- Alucita hirsuta Ustjuzhanin & Kovtunovich, 2024
- Alucita hofmanni
- Alucita homotrocha
- Alucita huebneri Wallengren, 1859
- Alucita hypocosma
- Alucita iberica Scholz & Jackh, 1994
- Alucita idiocrossa
- Alucita illuminatrix
- Alucita imbrifera
- Alucita iranensis
- Alucita ischalea
- Alucita isodina
- Alucita ithycypha
- Alucita japonica
- Alucita jujuyensis
- Alucita karadagica Zagulajev, 2000
- Alucita kazachstanica
- Alucita klimeschi Scholz & Jackh, 1997
- Alucita kosterini Ustjuzhanin, 1999
- Alucita lackneri Gielis, 2009
- Alucita lalannei B.Landry & J.-F.Landry, 2004
- Alucita libraria
- Alucita longipalpella
- Alucita loxoschista
- Alucita lyristis
- Alucita mabilabolensis Gielis, 2009
- Alucita magadis
- Alucita major (Rebel, 1906)
- Alucita manneringi Gielis, 2009
- Alucita maxima
- Alucita megaphimus
- Alucita melanodactyla
- Alucita mesolychna
- Alucita microdesma (Meyrick, 1929)
- Alucita micrographa (Diakonoff, 1954)
- Alucita microscopica
- Alucita molliflua
- Alucita montana Barnes & Lindsey, 1921 – Montana six-plume moth
- Alucita montigena
- Alucita mulciber
- Alucita myriodesma
- Alucita nannodactyla
- Alucita nasuta
- Alucita nephelotoxa
- Alucita niphadosema (Diakonoff, 1954)
- Alucita niphostrota
- Alucita nipsana Gielis, 2009
- Alucita nubifera
- Alucita ochraspis (Meyrick, 1929)
- Alucita ochriprota
- Alucita ochrobasalis van Mastrigt & Gielis, 2009
- Alucita ochrozona
- Alucita ordubadi
- Alucita palodactyla Zeller, 1847
- Alucita panduris
- Alucita panolbia
- Alucita papuaensis Gielis, 2009
- Alucita patria
- Alucita pectinata Scholz & Jackh, 1994
- Alucita pepperella
- Alucita phanerarcha
- Alucita philomela
- Alucita photaula
- Alucita phricodes
- Alucita pinalea
- Alucita pliginskii Zagulajev, 2000
- Alucita plumigera
- Alucita pluvialis
- Alucita poecilodactyla
- Alucita postfasciata
- Alucita potockyi Ustjuzhanin & Kovtunovich, 2024
- Alucita proseni
- Alucita pselioxantha
- Alucita pseudohuebneri
- Alucita pterochroma (J.F.G.Clarke, 1986)
- Alucita punctiferella
- Alucita pusilla
- Alucita pygmaea
- Alucita pyrczi Ustjuzhanin & Kovtunovich, 2024
- Alucita rhaptica
- Alucita rhymotoma
- Alucita riggii
- Alucita ruens
- Alucita rutteni Gielis, 2009
- Alucita sakhalinica
- Alucita sailtavica

+ Alucita sedlaceki Ustjuzhanin & Kovtunovich, 2024

- Alucita semophantis (Meyrick, 1929)
- Alucita sertifera
- Alucita seychellensis
- Alucita sikkima
- Alucita sokolovi Ustjuzhanin & Kovtunovich, 2024
- Alucita spicifera
- Alucita sroczki Ustjuzhanin & Kovtunovich, 2024
- Alucita stephanopis
- Alucita straminea
- Alucita syncophanta
- Alucita synnephodactyla
- Alucita tandilensis
- Alucita tesserata
- Alucita thapsina
- Alucita tonda Ustjuzhanin & Kovtunovich, 2024
- Alucita toxophila
- Alucita trachydesma
- Alucita trachyptera
- Alucita tricausta
- Alucita tridentata Scholz & Jackh, 1994
- Alucita ussurica Ustjuzhanin, 1999
- Alucita vanmastrigti Gielis, 2009
- Alucita walmakensis Gielis, 2009
- Alucita wamenaensis Gielis, 2009
- Alucita withaari Gielis, 2009
- Alucita xanthodes
- Alucita xanthosticta
- Alucita xanthozona (Diakonoff, 1954)
- Alucita "xanthozona" (J.F.G.Clarke, 1986) (Note: Preoccupied by Diakonoff's species and in need of renaming.)
- Alucita zonodactyla Zeller, 1847
- Alucita zumkehri Gielis, 2009
- Alucita zwieri Gielis, 2009
