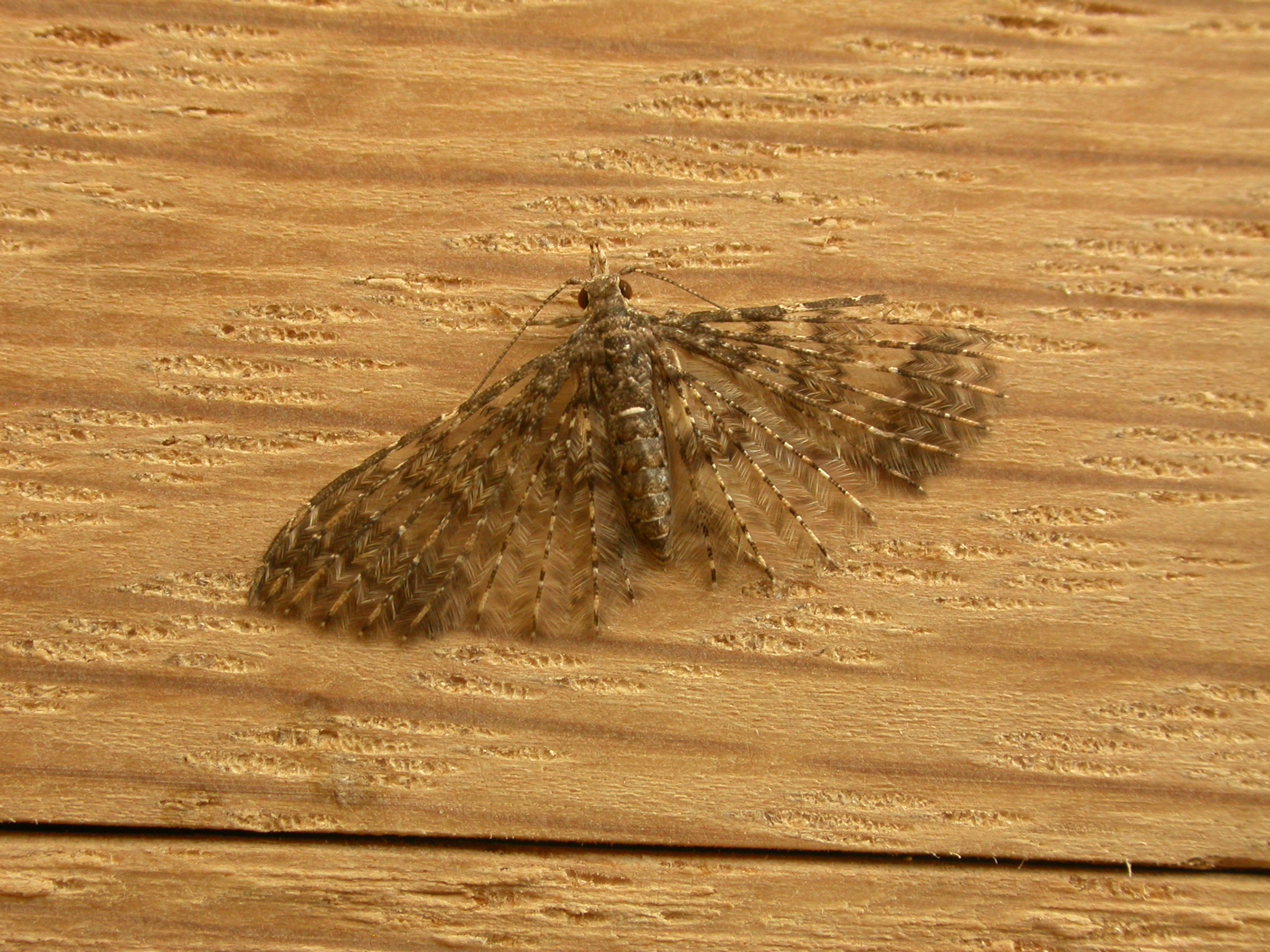

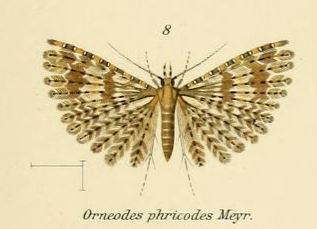

Scientific classification
- Kingdom: Animalia
- Phylum: Arthropoda
- Class: Insecta
- Order: Lepidoptera
- Family: Alucitidae
- Genus: Alucita
- Species: A. phricodes

Binomial name
- Alucita phricodes Meyrick, 1886

= Alucita phricodes =

Species of many-plumed moth in genus Alucita

Alucita phricodes is a species of moth of the family Alucitidae. It is found from the Atherton Tableland in Queensland to Batemans Bay in New South Wales.

The wingspan is about 10 mm.

The larvae feed on the buds and flowers of Pandorea jasminoides and Pandorea pandorana.
