= Alucita xanthosticta =

Scientific classification
- Kingdom: Animalia
- Phylum: Arthropoda
- Class: Insecta
- Order: Lepidoptera
- Family: Alucitidae
- Genus: Alucita
- Species: A. xanthosticta

Binomial name
- Alucita xanthosticta (Turner, 1923)

Synonyms
- Orneodes xanthosticta Turner, 1923

Species of many-plumed moth in genus Alucita

Alucita xanthosticta is a species of moth of the family Alucitidae. It is found in Australia.
