= Alucita sikkima =

Scientific classification
- Kingdom: Animalia
- Phylum: Arthropoda
- Class: Insecta
- Order: Lepidoptera
- Family: Alucitidae
- Genus: Alucita
- Species: A. sikkima

Binomial name
- Alucita sikkima (Moore, 1887)

Synonyms
- Orneodes sikkima Moore, 1887

Species of many-plumed moth in genus Alucita

Alucita sikkima is a moth of the family Alucitidae. It is found in India (Sikkim).
