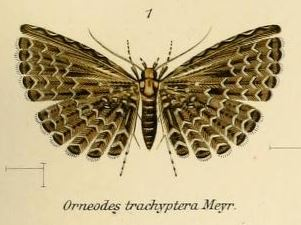

Scientific classification
- Kingdom: Animalia
- Phylum: Arthropoda
- Class: Insecta
- Order: Lepidoptera
- Family: Alucitidae
- Genus: Alucita
- Species: A. trachyptera

Binomial name
- Alucita trachyptera (Meyrick, 1906)

Synonyms
- Orneodes trachyptera Meyrick, 1906

= Alucita trachyptera =

Species of many-plumed moth in genus Alucita

Alucita trachyptera is a moth of the family Alucitidae. It is found in southern India and Sri Lanka.
