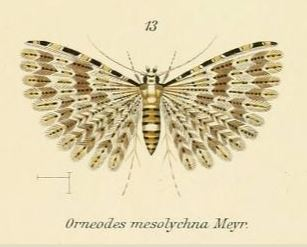

Scientific classification
- Kingdom: Animalia
- Phylum: Arthropoda
- Class: Insecta
- Order: Lepidoptera
- Family: Alucitidae
- Genus: Alucita
- Species: A. mesolychna

Binomial name
- Alucita mesolychna (Meyrick, 1907)

Synonyms
- Orneodes mesolychna Meyrick, 1907

= Alucita mesolychna =

Species of many-plumed moth in genus Alucita

Alucita mesolychna is a moth of the family Alucitidae. It is found in Sri Lanka and India (Assam).
