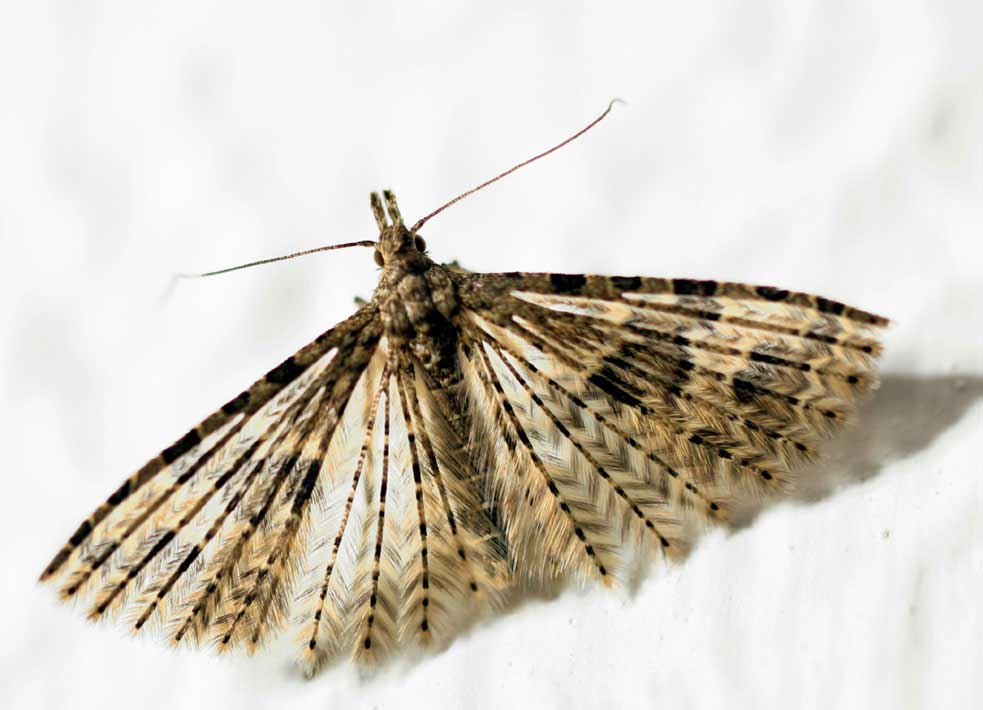

Scientific classification
- Kingdom: Animalia
- Phylum: Arthropoda
- Clade: Pancrustacea
- Class: Insecta
- Order: Lepidoptera
- Family: Alucitidae
- Genus: Alucita
- Species: A. hexadactyla

Binomial name
- Alucita hexadactyla Linnaeus, 1758

Synonyms
- List: Orneodes hexadactyla (Linnaeus, 1758); Phalaena hexadactyla Linnaeus, 1758; Phalaena (Alucita) hexadactyla Linnaeus, 1758; Alucita poecilodactyla Stephens, 1835; Alucita polydactyla Hubner, 1813

= Alucita hexadactyla =

Twenty-plume moth

Species of many-plumed moth in genus Alucita

Alucita hexadactyla (twenty-plume moth) is a "micromoth" of the many-plumed moth family (Alucitidae). It is found in Eurasia. It was previously thought to also occur in North America, but a 2004 study showed that the North American species are distinct.

== Description ==
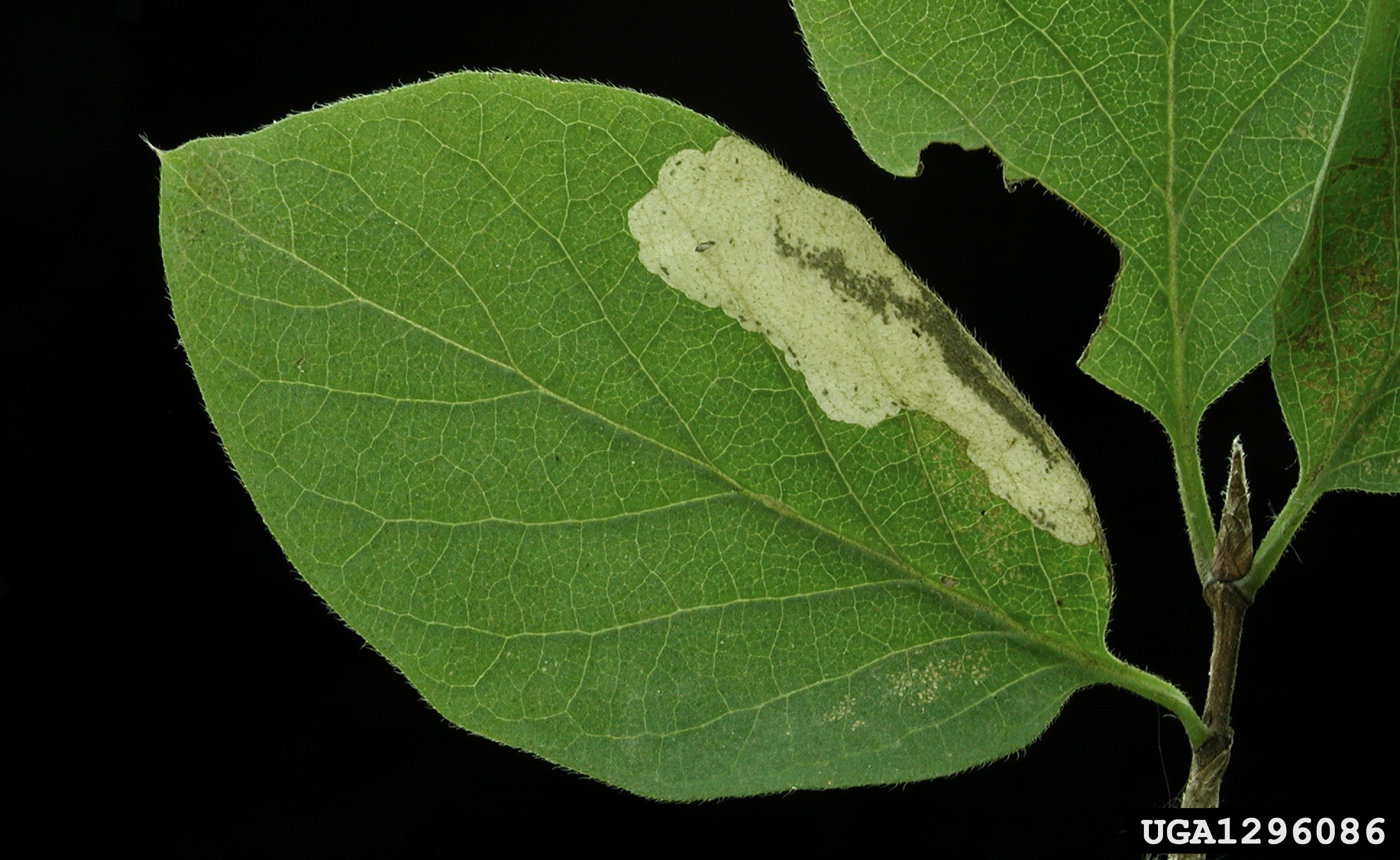
Feeding signs of a larva

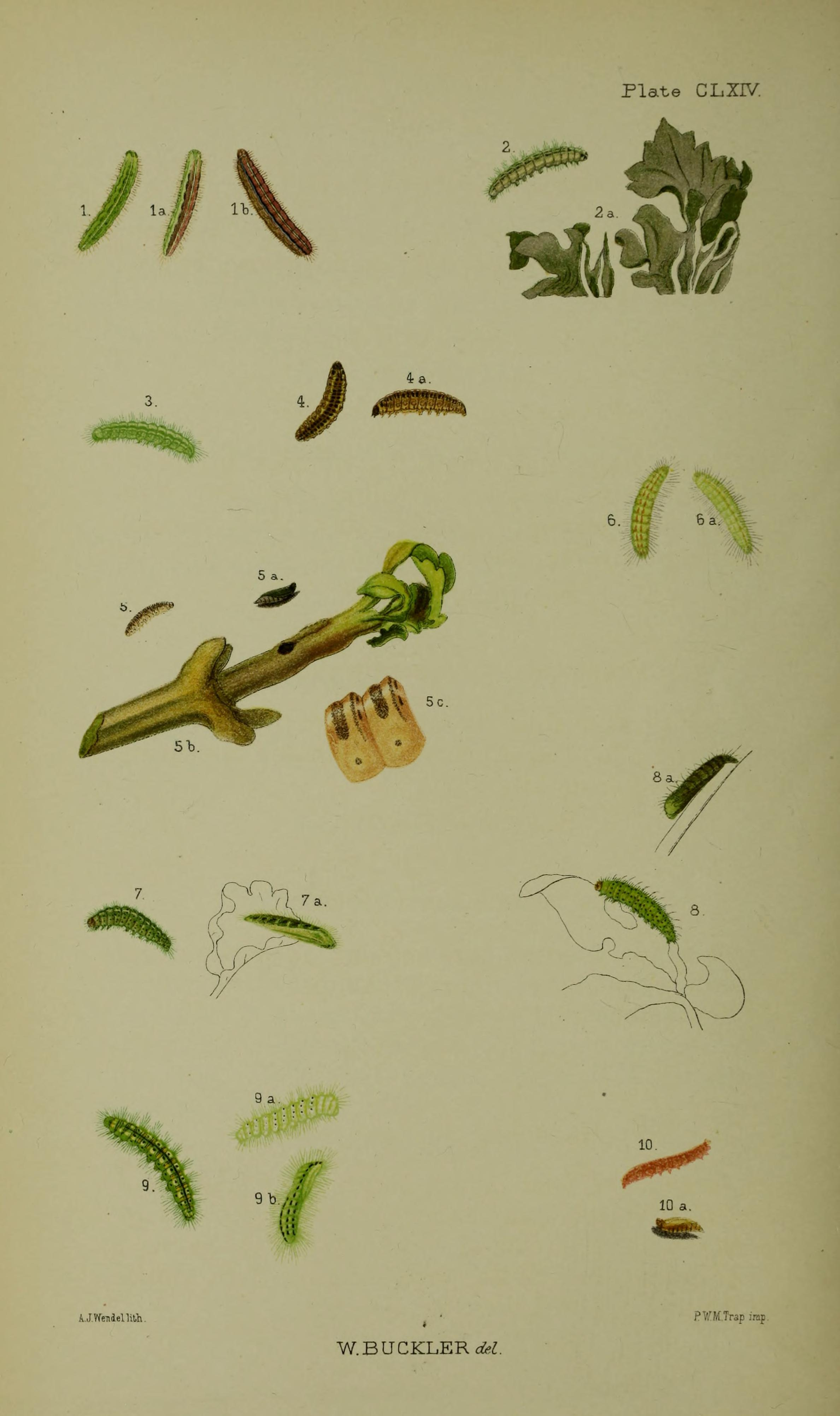
Figs. 10 larva after final moult, 10a pupa

The wingspan is 14–16 mm. Unlike a typical moth, which has two pairs of scaly wings, Alucita has about twenty thin feathery plumes (with scales on the supporting ribs). It perches with the wings outspread like a fan. The wings have a bold zigzag pattern in white, black and brown, which together with the shiny backward-pointing hairs on each plume make the adult moth distinctive. It is also popularly known as the many-plumed moth, while the specific name hexadactyla comes from the Greek for six-fingered. Single brooded, it can be found at any time of the year. It is common and often found in gardens, but is readily overlooked because of its small size.

The larvae feed on honeysuckle (Lonicera species) tunnelling in the flower buds and leaves. Holes and darkening of the buds indicate larval feeding. There is disagreement as to whether the larvae are leaf miners or gall causers.
