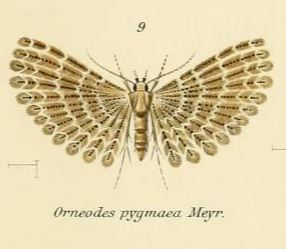

Scientific classification
- Kingdom: Animalia
- Phylum: Arthropoda
- Class: Insecta
- Order: Lepidoptera
- Family: Alucitidae
- Genus: Alucita
- Species: A. pygmaea

Binomial name
- Alucita pygmaea Meyrick, 1890

Synonyms
- Orneodes pygmaea Meyrick

= Alucita pygmaea =

Species of many-plumed moth in genus Alucita

Alucita pygmaea is a species of moth of the family Alucitidae. It is found in the northern half of Australia, as well as Fiji.

The wingspan is about 8 mm.

The larvae feed on Canthium oleifolium.
