= Many-plumed moth =

Many-plumed moths
- Twenty-plume moth (Alucita hexadactyla: Alucitidae)

Scientific classification
- Kingdom: Animalia
- Phylum: Arthropoda
- Clade: Pancrustacea
- Class: Insecta
- Order: Lepidoptera
- Superfamily: Alucitoidea
- Family: Alucitidae; Leach, 1815

Type species
- Alucita hexadactyla Linnaeus, 1758

Diversity
- 9 genera, about 210 species

Synonyms
- Alucitina Zeller, 1841; Orneodidae

Family of moths

The Alucitidae or many-plumed moths are a family of moths with unusually modified wings. Both fore- and hind-wings consist of about six rigid spines, from which radiate flexible bristles creating a structure similar to a bird's feather.

This is a small family, with about a global total of 210 species described to date (though it is likely that some undescribed species remain to be discovered). They are found mostly in temperate to subtropical (but not tropical) regions.

== Systematics and taxonomy ==
The taxonomy of this family is somewhat disputed. Here, they are united in superfamily Alucitoidea with the Tineodidae, a diverse group of numerous small genera with about 20 species all together. However, the two supposed Alucitoidea families may be polyphyletic with regard to each other, and Tineodidae better included in Alucitidae. In any case, the similar-looking plume moths (Pterophoroidea) are widely held to be very close, if not the closest living relatives of the Alucitoidea.

Earlier, many authors assumed that the fruitworm moths (Copromorphoidea) were also very closely related to the Alucitidae (and the fringe-tufted moths, Epermeniidae) – according to some, closer in fact than the Pterophoroidea and even the Tineodidae. In this Alucitoidea do not exist; Alucitidae and Tineodidae are assigned to different (but still most closely related) superfamilies. In the treatment here, the Copromorphoidea are presumed to be the most advanced of these lineages of small but fairly "modern" moths, while the Alucitoidea and Pterophoroidea are more primitive.

== Genera ==
The genera presently placed here, sorted alphabetically, are:

- Alinguata
- Alucita
- Hebdomactis
- Hexeretmis
- Microschismus
- Paelia
- Prymnotomis
- Pterotopteryx
- Triscaedecia

== Bibliography ==
- Data related to Alucitidae at Wikispecies. Version of 2010-AUG-10.
- Minet, Joel (1991). "Tentative reconstruction of the ditrysian phylogeny (Lepidoptera: Glossata)". Insect Systematics & Evolution. 22 (1): 69–95. doi:10.1163/187631291X00327. ISSN 1399-560X.
- Tree of Life Web Project (ToL) (2003): Alucitoidea. Version of 2003-JAN-01. Retrieved 2011-SEP-24.
