= List of moths of Russia (Choreutoidea-Thyridoidea) =

This is a list of the Russian moth species of the superfamilies Choreutoidea, Urodoidea, Schreckensteinioidea, Epermenioidea, Alucitoidea, Pterophoroidea, Copromorphoidea and Thyridoidea. It also acts as an index to the species articles and forms part of the full List of moths of Russia.

== Choreutoidea ==
=== Choreutidae ===
- Anthophila abhasica Danilevsky, 1969
- Anthophila armata Danilevsky, 1969
- Anthophila bidzilyai Budashkin, 1997
- Anthophila colchica Danilevsky, 1969
- Anthophila decolorana Danilevsky, 1969
- Anthophila fabriciana (Linnaeus, 1767)
- Anthophila filipjevi Danilevsky, 1969
- Choreutis atrosignata (Christoph, 1888)
- Choreutis diana (Hübner, 1822)
- Choreutis nemorana (Hübner, 1799)
- Choreutis pariana (Clerck, 1759)
- Choreutis vinosa (Diakonoff, 1978)
- Millieria dolosalis (Heydenreich, 1851)
- Prochoreutis alpina (Arita, 1976)
- Prochoreutis anikini Budashkin, 2006
- Prochoreutis hadrogastra (Diakonoff, 1978)
- Prochoreutis holotoxa (Meyrick, 1903)
- Prochoreutis monognoma (Diakonoff, 1978)
- Prochoreutis myllerana (Fabricius, 1794)
- Prochoreutis sachalinensis (Danilevsky, 1969)
- Prochoreutis sehestediana (Fabricius, 1776)
- Prochoreutis solaris (Erschoff, 1877)
- Prochoreutis stellaris (Zeller, 1847)
- Prochoreutis subdelicata Arita, 1987
- Prochoreutis ultimana (Krulikowsky, 1909)
- Prochoreutis ussurica (Danilevsky, 1969)
- Tebenna bjerkandrella (Thunberg, 1784)
- Tebenna chingana Danilevsky, 1969
- Tebenna submicalis Danilevsky, 1969

== Urodoidea ==
=== Urodidae ===
- Wockia asperipunctella (Bruand, 1851)

== Schreckensteinioidea ==
=== Schreckensteiniidae ===
- Schreckensteinia festaliella (Hübner, [1819])

== Epermenioidea ==
=== Epermeniidae ===
- Epermenia aequidentella (Hofmann, 1867)
- Epermenia chaerophyllella (Goeze, 1783)
- Epermenia devotella (Heyden, 1863)
- Epermenia falciformis (Haworth, 1828)
- Epermenia farreni (Walsingham, 1894)
- Epermenia illigerella (Hübner, [1813])
- Epermenia iniquella (Wocke, 1867)
- Epermenia insecurella (Stainton, 1849)
- Epermenia ochreomaculella ochreomaculella (Milliere, 1854)
- Epermenia ochreomaculella asiatica Gaedike, 1979
- Epermenia petrusella (Heylaerts, 1883)
- Epermenia pontificella (Hübner, 1796)
- Epermenia profugella (Stainton, 1856)
- Epermenia scurella (Stainton, 1851)
- Epermenia sergei Budashkin, 1996
- Epermenia sinjovi Gaedike, 1993
- Epermenia strictella (Wocke, 1867)
- Epermenia thailandica Gaedike, 1987
- Ochromolopis kaszabi Gaedike, 1973
- Ochromolopis zagulajevi Budashkin & Satschkov, 1991
- Phaulernis chasanica Gaedike, 1993
- Phaulernis dentella (Zeller, 1839)
- Phaulernis fulviguttella (Zeller, 1839)
- Phaulernis pulchra Gaedike, 1993

== Alucitoidea ==
=== Alucitidae ===
- Alucita cancellata (Meyrick, 1908)
- Alucita desmodactyla Zeller, 1847
- Alucita eumorphodactyla (Caradja, 1920)
- Alucita grammodactyla Zeller, 1841
- Alucita helena Ustjuzhanin, 1991
- Alucita hexadactyla Linnaeus, 1758
- Alucita huebneri Wallengren, 1859
- Alucita klimeschi Scholz, 1997
- Alucita palodactyla Zeller, 1847
- Alucita poecilodactyla Alphéraky, 1876
- Alucita sakhalinica Zagulajev, 1995
- Alucita ussurica Ustjuzhanin, 1999
- Alucita zonodactyla Zeller, 1847
- Pterotopteryx dodecadactyla (Hübner, [1813])
- Pterotopteryx lonicericola Kuznetzov, 1978
- Pterotopteryx monticola Zagulajev, 1992
- Pterotopteryx synaphodactyla (Alphéraky, 1876)

== Pterophoroidea ==
=== Pterophoridae ===
- Adaina microdactyla (Hübner, [1813])
- Agdistis adactyla (Hübner, [1823])
- Agdistis caradjai Arenberger, 1975
- Agdistis dahurica Zagulajev, 1994
- Agdistis falkovitshi Zagulajev, 1986
- Agdistis frankeniae (Zeller, 1847)
- Agdistis ingens Christoph, 1887
- Agdistis intermedia Caradja, 1920
- Agdistis kulunda Ustjuzhanin, 1991
- Agdistis manicata Staudinger, 1859
- Agdistis mevlaniella Arenberger, 1972
- Agdistis paralia (Zeller, 1847)
- Agdistis rubasiensis Zagulajev, 1985
- Agdistis tamaricis (Zeller, 1847)
- Amblyptilia acanthadactyla (Hübner, [1813])
- Amblyptilia grisea Gibeaux, 1997
- Amblyptilia punctidactyla (Haworth, 1811)
- Buckleria paludum (Zeller, 1839)
- Buszkoiana capnodactylus (Zeller, 1841)
- Calyciphora albodactyla (Fabricius, 1794)
- Calyciphora homoiodactyla (Kasy, 1960)
- Calyciphora nephelodactyla (Eversmann, 1844)
- Calyciphora xanthodactyla (Treitschke, 1833)
- Capperia celeusi (Frey, 1886)
- Capperia fusca (Hofmann, 1898)
- Capperia maratonica Adamczewski, 1951
- Capperia trichodactyla ([Denis & Schiffermüller], 1775)
- Cnaemidophorus rhododactyla ([Denis & Schiffermüller], 1775)
- Crombrugghia distans (Zeller, 1847)
- Crombrugghia kollari (Stainton, 1851)
- Crombrugghia laetus (Zeller, 1847)
- Crombrugghia tristis (Zeller, 1841)
- Emmelina argoteles (Meyrick, 1922)
- Emmelina monodactyla (Linnaeus, 1758)
- Emmelina pseudojezonica Derra, 1987
- Fuscoptilia emarginata (Snellen, 1884)
- Geina didactyla (Linnaeus, 1758)
- Gillmeria macrornis (Meyrick, 1930)
- Gillmeria melanoschista (T. B. Fletcher, 1940)
- Gillmeria miantodactylus (Zeller, 1841)
- Gillmeria pallidactyla (Haworth, 1811)
- Gillmeria rhusiodactyla (Fuchs, 1903)
- Gillmeria stenoptiloides (Filipjev, 1927)
- Gillmeria tetradactyla (Linnaeus, 1758)
- Gillmeria vesta Ustjuzhanin, 1996
- Gypsochares baptodactylus (Zeller, 1850)
- Gypsochares kyraensis (Ustjuzhanin, 1996)
- Hellinsia albidactyla (Yano, 1963)
- Hellinsia carphodactyla (Hilbner, [1813])
- Hellinsia chrysocomae (Ragonot, 1875)
- Hellinsia didactylites (Strom, 1783)
- Hellinsia distinctus (Herrich-Schäffer, 1855)
- Hellinsia innocens (Snellen, 1884)
- Hellinsia inulae (Zeller, 1852)
- Hellinsia ishiyamana (Matsumura, 1931)
- Hellinsia kuwayamai (Matsumura, 1931)
- Hellinsia lienigianus (Zeller, 1852)
- Hellinsia mongolica (Zagulajev & Pentscukovskaja, 1972)
- Hellinsia nigridactyla (Yano, 1961)
- Hellinsia osteodactylus (Zeller, 1841)
- Hellinsia pectodactylus (Staudinger, 1859)
- Hellinsia tephradactyla (Hübner, [1813])
- Hellinsia trimmatodactylus (Christoph, 1872)
- Hellinsia wrangeliensis (Zagulajev, 1985)
- Marasmarcha cinnamomea (Staudinger, 1870)
- Marasmarcha colossa Caradja, 1920
- Marasmarcha lydia Ustjuzhanin, 1996
- Marasmarcha rhypodactyla (Staudinger, 1871)
- Merrifieldia baliodactylus (Zeller, 1841)
- Merrifieldia leucodactyla ([Denis & Schiffermüller], 1775)
- Merrifieldia malacodactylus (Zeller, 1847)
- Merrifieldia tridactyla (Linnaeus, 1758)
- Oidaematophorus iwatensis (Matsumura, 1931)
- Oidaematophorus lithodactyla (Treitschke, 1833)
- Oidaematophorus rogenhoferi (Mann, 1871)
- Oirata poculidactyla (Nupponen & Nupponen, 2001)
- Oirata volgensis (Moschler, 1862)
- Oxyptilus chrysodactyla ([Denis & Schiffermüller], 1775)
- Oxyptilus ericetorum (Stainton, 1851)
- Oxyptilus parvidactyla (Haworth, 1811)
- Oxyptilus pilosellae (Zeller, 1841)
- Paraplatyptilia hedemanni (Snellen, 1884)
- Paraplatyptilia metzneri (Zeller, 1841)
- Paraplatyptilia sahlbergi (Poppius, 1906)
- Paraplatyptilia sibirica (Zagulajev, 1983)
- Paraplatyptilia terminalis (Erschoff, 1877)
- Paraplatyptilia vacillans (Snellen, 1884)
- Platyptilia ainonis Matsumura, 1931
- Platyptilia ardua McDunnough, 1927
- Platyptilia calodactyla ([Denis & Schiffermüller], 1775)
- Platyptilia farfarellus Zeller, 1867
- Platyptilia gonodactyla ([Denis & Schiffermüller], 1775)
- Platyptilia lusi Ustjuzhanin, 1996
- Platyptilia naminga Ustjuzhanin, 1996
- Platyptilia nemoralis Zeller, 1841
- Platyptilia tesseradactyla (Linnaeus, 1761)
- Platyptilia tshukotka Ustjuzhanin, 1996
- Platyptilia ussuriensis (Caradja, 1920)
- Porrittia galactodactyla ([Denis & Schiffermüller], 1775)
- Procapperia kuldschaensis (Rebel, 1914)
- Procapperia linariae (Chretien, 1922)
- Procapperia maculatus (Constant, 1865)
- Pselnophorus heterodactyla (Muller, 1764)
- Pselnophorus poggei (Mann, 1862)
- Pselnophorus vilis (Butler, 1881)
- Pterophorus ischnodactyla (Treitschke, 1835)
- Pterophorus pentadactyla (Linnaeus, 1758)
- Septuaginta zagulajevi Ustjuzhanin, 1996
- Stenoptilia admiranda Yano, 1963
- Stenoptilia annadactyla Sutter, 1988
- Stenoptilia bipunctidactyla (Scopo1i, 1763)
- Stenoptilia convexa Arenberger, 1998
- Stenoptilia coprodactyla (Stainton, 1851)
- Stenoptilia eborinodactyla Zagulajev, 1986
- Stenoptilia graphodactyla (Treitschke, 1833)
- Stenoptilia islandicus (Staudinger, 1857)
- Stenoptilia jacutica Ustjuzhanin, 1996
- Stenoptilia kosterini Ustjuzhanin, 2001
- Stenoptilia kurushensis Kovtunovich, 2000
- Stenoptilia latistriga Rebel, 1916
- Stenoptilia luteocinerea (Snellen, 1884)
- Stenoptilia mannii (Zeller, 1852)
- Stenoptilia nolckeni (Tengstrom, 1869)
- Stenoptilia parnasia Arenberger, 1986
- Stenoptilia pelidnodactyla (Stein, 1837)
- Stenoptilia pinarodactyla (Erschoff, 1877)
- Stenoptilia pneumonanthes (Buttner, 1880)
- Stenoptilia poculi Arenberger, 1998
- Stenoptilia pterodactyla (Linnaeus, 1761)
- Stenoptilia stigmatodactylus (Zeller, 1852)
- Stenoptilia stigmatoides Sutter & Skyva, 1992
- Stenoptilia veronicae Karvonen, 1932
- Stenoptilia zophodactylus (Duponchel, 1840)
- Stenoptilodes taprobanes (R.Felder & Rogenhofer, 1875)
- Tabulaephorus decipiens (Lederer, 1870)
- Tabulaephorus marptys (Christoph, 1872)
- Tabulaephorus ussuriensis (Caradja, 1920)
- Wheeleria obsoletus (Zeller, 1841)
- Wheeleria phlomidis (Staudinger, 1871)
- Wheeleria spilodactylus (Curtis, 1827)

== Copromorphoidea ==
=== Carposinidae ===
- Carposina askoldana Diakonoff, 1989
- Carposina maritima Ponomarenko, 1999
- Carposina sasakii Matsumura, 1900
- Carposina viduana Caradja, 1916
- Meridarchis excisa (Walsingham, 1900)

== Thyridoidea ==
=== Thyrididae ===
- Pyrinioides aureus Butler, 1881
- Rhodoneura erecta (Leech, 1889)
- Rhodoneura shini Park & Byun, 1990
- Rhodoneura vittula Guenee, 1858
- Sericophara guttata Christoph, 1881
- Striglina cancellata (Christoph, 1881)
- Thyris fenestrella (Scopoli, 1763)
- Thyris usitata Butler, 1879
