= S. amseli =

S. amseli may refer to:

- Scopula amseli, a geometer moth
- Scrobipalpa amseli, a twirler moth
- Stagmatophora amseli, a cosmet moth
- Stenoptilia amseli, a plume moth
