= Stenoptilia tenuis =

Scientific classification
- Kingdom: Animalia
- Phylum: Arthropoda
- Clade: Pancrustacea
- Class: Insecta
- Order: Lepidoptera
- Family: Pterophoridae
- Genus: Stenoptilia
- Species: S. tenuis

Binomial name
- Stenoptilia tenuis (C. Felder, R. Felder & Rogenhofer, 1875)

Synonyms
- Mimeseoptilus tenuis Felder & Rogenhofer, 1875; Mimeseoptilus gilvidorsis Zeller, 1877

Species of plume moth

Stenoptilia tenuis is a moth of the family Pterophoridae. It is known from Bolivia, Colombia, Ecuador and Peru.

The wingspan is 18–23 mm. Adults are on wing from February to May.
