= Procapperia tadzhica =

Scientific classification
- Kingdom: Animalia
- Phylum: Arthropoda
- Class: Insecta
- Order: Lepidoptera
- Family: Pterophoridae
- Genus: Procapperia
- Species: P. tadzhica

Binomial name
- Procapperia tadzhica Zagulajev, 2002

Species of plume moth

Procapperia tadzhica is a moth of the family Pterophoridae that lives in Tajikistan.
