= Stenoptilia suprema =

Scientific classification
- Kingdom: Animalia
- Phylum: Arthropoda
- Clade: Pancrustacea
- Class: Insecta
- Order: Lepidoptera
- Family: Pterophoridae
- Genus: Stenoptilia
- Species: S. suprema

Binomial name
- Stenoptilia suprema Meyrick, 1926

Species of plume moth

Stenoptilia suprema is a moth of the family Pterophoridae. It is known from Colombia, Ecuador and Peru.

The wingspan is about 26 mm. Adults are active in January and August.
