= Stenoptilia albilimbata =

Scientific classification
- Kingdom: Animalia
- Phylum: Arthropoda
- Clade: Pancrustacea
- Class: Insecta
- Order: Lepidoptera
- Family: Pterophoridae
- Genus: Stenoptilia
- Species: S. albilimbata

Binomial name
- Stenoptilia albilimbata Yano, 1963

Species of plume moth

Stenoptilia albilimbata is a moth of the family Pterophoridae. It is known from Japan (Honshu).

The length of the forewings is 12–14 mm.
