= Stenoptilia etcetera =

Scientific classification
- Kingdom: Animalia
- Phylum: Arthropoda
- Clade: Pancrustacea
- Class: Insecta
- Order: Lepidoptera
- Family: Pterophoridae
- Genus: Stenoptilia
- Species: S. etcetera

Binomial name
- Stenoptilia etcetera Arenberger, 1998

Species of plume moth

Stenoptilia etcetera is a moth of the family Pterophoridae. It is found in Kyrgyzstan.
