= Stenoptilia platanodes =

Scientific classification
- Kingdom: Animalia
- Phylum: Arthropoda
- Clade: Pancrustacea
- Class: Insecta
- Order: Lepidoptera
- Family: Pterophoridae
- Genus: Stenoptilia
- Species: S. platanodes

Binomial name
- Stenoptilia platanodes Meyrick, 1914

Species of plume moth

Stenoptilia platanodes is a moth of the family Pterophoridae. It is found in Taiwan.
