= Stenoptilia atlanticola =

Scientific classification
- Kingdom: Animalia
- Phylum: Arthropoda
- Clade: Pancrustacea
- Class: Insecta
- Order: Lepidoptera
- Family: Pterophoridae
- Genus: Stenoptilia
- Species: S. atlanticola

Binomial name
- Stenoptilia atlanticola Zerny, 1936

Species of plume moth

Stenoptilia atlanticola is a moth of the family Pterophoridae. It is found in Morocco.

The wingspan is 25 mm. The forewings are brown and the hindwings are creamy brown.
