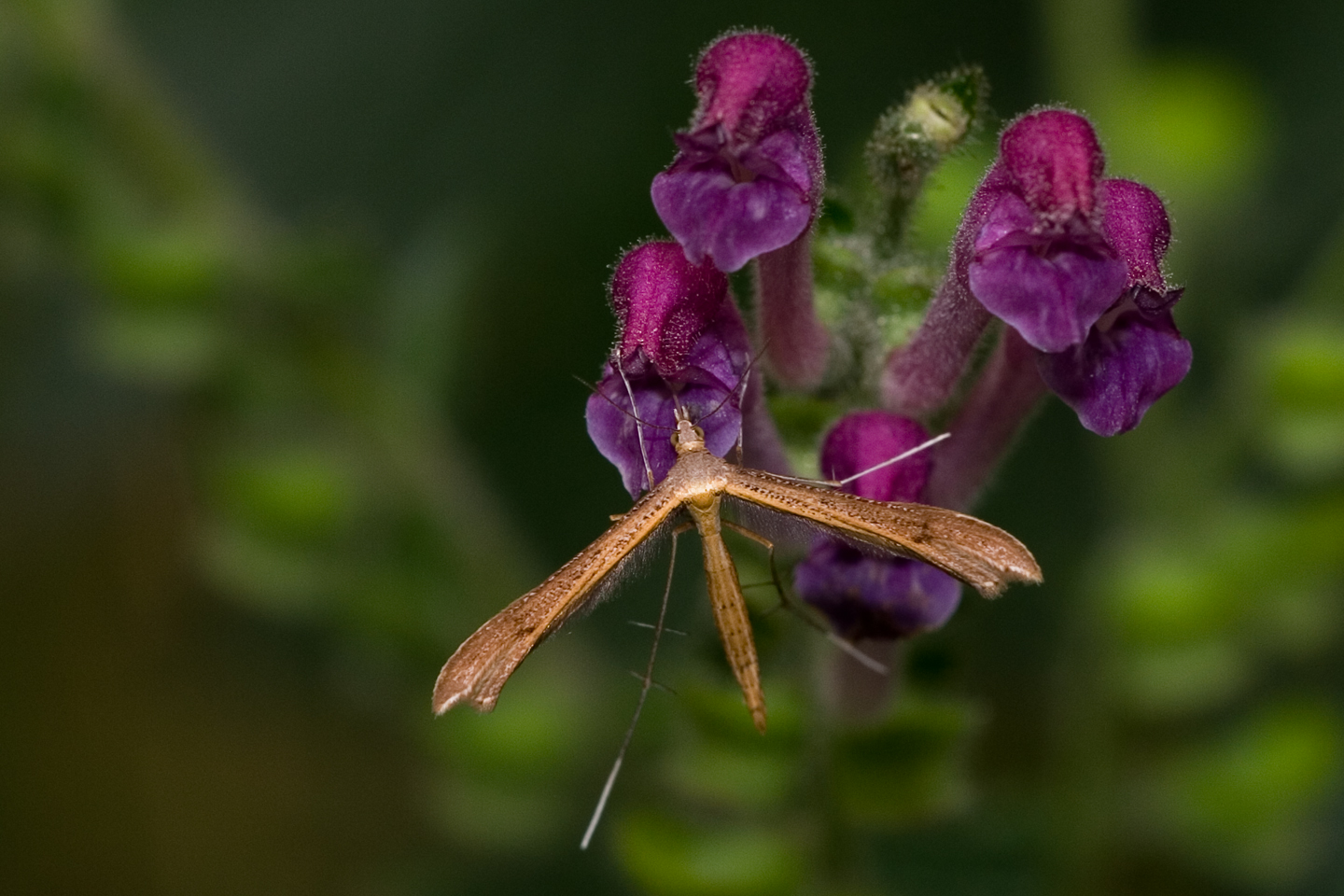

Scientific classification
- Kingdom: Animalia
- Phylum: Arthropoda
- Clade: Pancrustacea
- Class: Insecta
- Order: Lepidoptera
- Family: Pterophoridae
- Genus: Stenoptilia
- Species: S. pterodactyla

Binomial name
- Stenoptilia pterodactyla (Linnaeus, 1761)

Synonyms
- Alucita pterodactyla Linnaeus, 1761; Pterophorus fuscus Retzius, 1783; Alucita fuscodactyla Haworth, 1811; Alucita ptilodactyla Hübner, 1813

= Stenoptilia pterodactyla =

Species of plume moth

Stenoptilia pterodactyla, the brown plume is a moth of the family Pterophoroidea. It is found in Europe, North America, Anatolia, Iran and China. It was first described by the Swedish taxonomist, Carl Linnaeus in 1761.

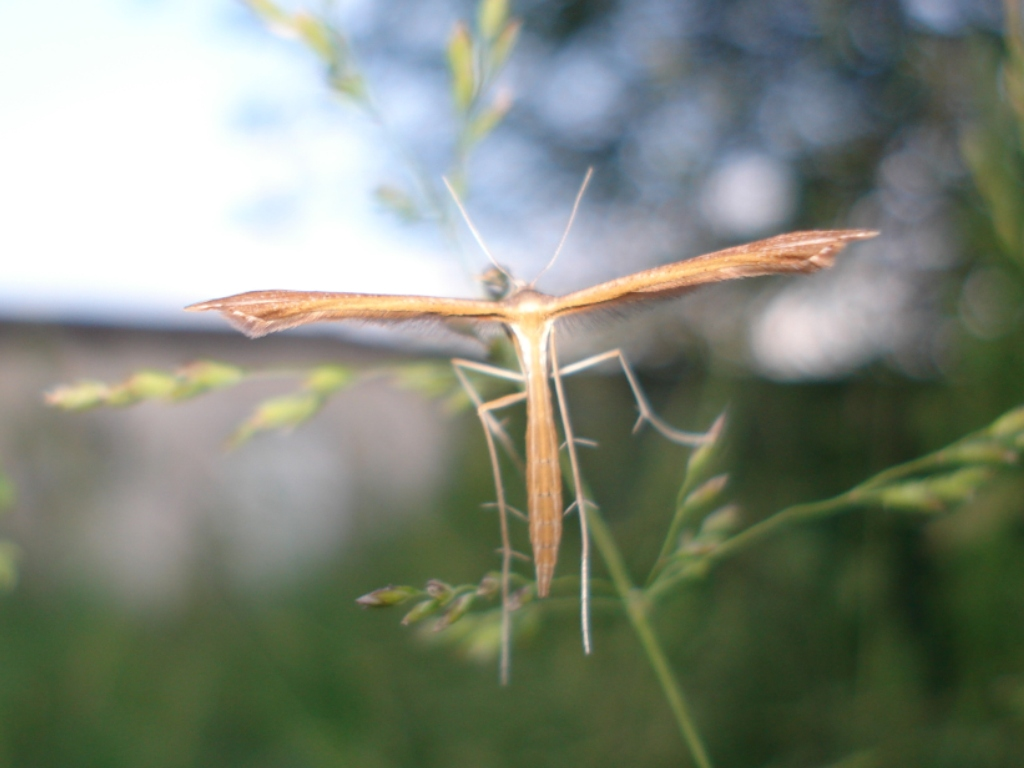

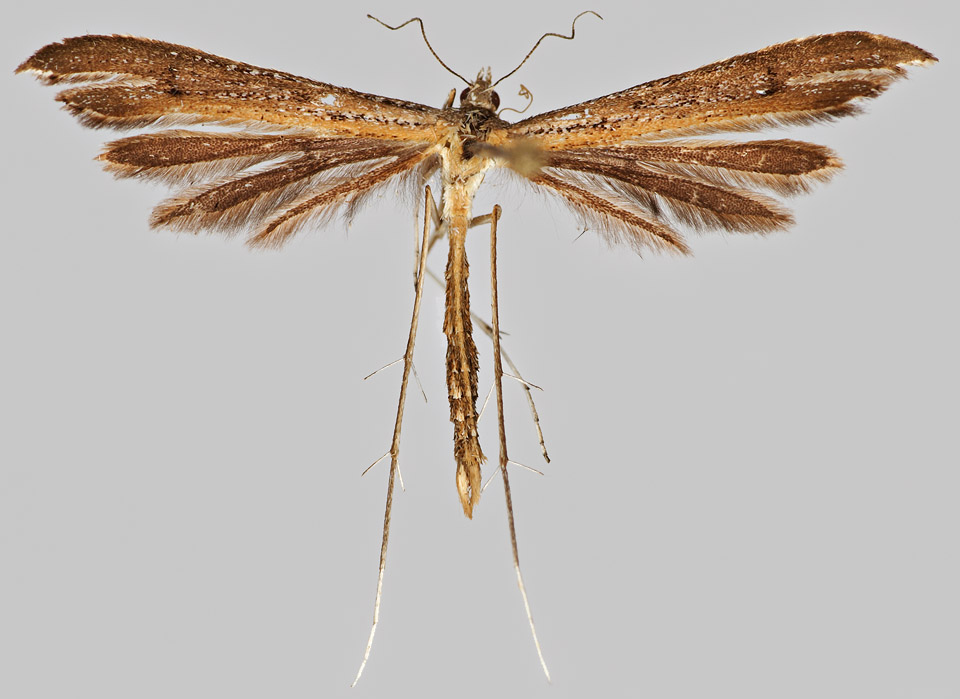

== Description ==
The moths have a wingspan is 20–26 mm, are single brooded, flying from late May to early August. They are easily disturbed during the day and will come to light at dusk. Care needs to be take when identifying the moths, as worn specimens look similar to the worn specimens of Stenoptilia bipunctidactyla. Fresh species of S. pterodactyla can be distinguished by the fine white hairs along the costa (i.e. the leading edge of the wing) and the wings orchreous colour; cf. the grey-brown wings of S. bipunctidactyla and the dark costal cilia. These differences may be less clear in worn specimens.

Larvae mine the stems and shoots of germander speedwell (Veronica chamaedrys) from August to March and feed on the flowers in April and May.
