= Stenoptilia johnistella =

Scientific classification
- Kingdom: Animalia
- Phylum: Arthropoda
- Clade: Pancrustacea
- Class: Insecta
- Order: Lepidoptera
- Family: Pterophoridae
- Genus: Stenoptilia
- Species: S. johnistella

Binomial name
- Stenoptilia johnistella Ustjuzhanin et Kovtunovich, 2010

Species of plume moth

Stenoptilia johnistella is a moth of the family Pterophoridae. It is known from South Africa.
