= Tabulaephorus afghanus =

Scientific classification
- Kingdom: Animalia
- Phylum: Arthropoda
- Class: Insecta
- Order: Lepidoptera
- Family: Pterophoridae
- Genus: Tabulaephorus
- Species: T. afghanus

Binomial name
- Tabulaephorus afghanus (Arenberger, 1981)

Synonyms
- Pterophorus afghanus Arenberger, 1981

Species of plume moth

Tabulaephorus afghanus is a moth of the family Pterophoridae. It was described by Ernst Arenberger in 1981 and is found in Afghanistan.

The wingspan is 25–27 mm.
