= Stenoptilia tyropiesta =

Scientific classification
- Kingdom: Animalia
- Phylum: Arthropoda
- Clade: Pancrustacea
- Class: Insecta
- Order: Lepidoptera
- Family: Pterophoridae
- Genus: Stenoptilia
- Species: S. tyropiesta

Binomial name
- Stenoptilia tyropiesta Meyrick, 1932

Species of plume moth

Stenoptilia tyropiesta is a moth of the family Pterophoridae. It is known from Ethiopia.
