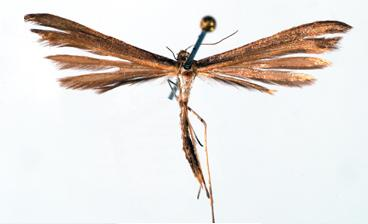

Scientific classification
- Kingdom: Animalia
- Phylum: Arthropoda
- Clade: Pancrustacea
- Class: Insecta
- Order: Lepidoptera
- Family: Pterophoridae
- Genus: Stenoptilia
- Species: S. kiitulo

Binomial name
- Stenoptilia kiitulo Gielis, 2008

= Stenoptilia kiitulo =

Species of plume moth

Stenoptilia kiitulo is a moth of the family Pterophoroidea. It is found in Tanzania on heights of 2600 to 2700 metres. The species is named after the region of occurrence, the Kiitulo Plateau.

The wingspan is 19–22 mm. The moth flies in November and December.
