= Stenoptilia murzini =

Scientific classification
- Kingdom: Animalia
- Phylum: Arthropoda
- Clade: Pancrustacea
- Class: Insecta
- Order: Lepidoptera
- Family: Pterophoridae
- Genus: Stenoptilia
- Species: S. murzini

Binomial name
- Stenoptilia murzini Gibeaux, 1995

Species of plume moth

Stenoptilia murzini is a moth of the family Pterophoridae.
