= List of moths of Russia =

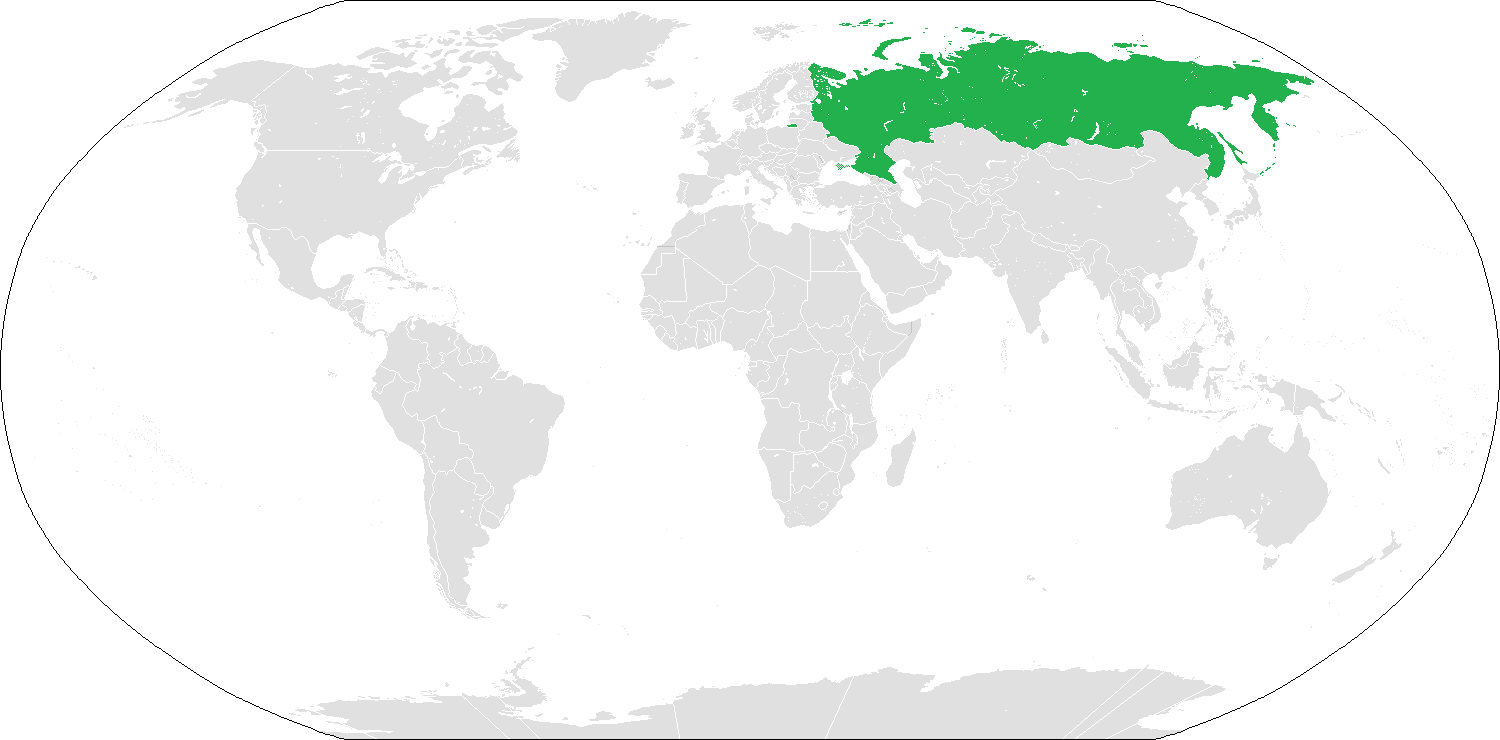
Location of Russia

Moths of Russia represent a large majority of the about 8,900 known Lepidoptera species of Russia. The moths (mostly nocturnal) and butterflies (mostly diurnal) together make up the taxonomic order Lepidoptera.

This page provides a link to detailed lists of moth species which have been recorded in Russia.

== Lists based on superfamilies ==
- List of moths of Russia (superfamilies Micropterigoidea to Yponomeutoidea): Micropterigoidea: Micropterigidae, Eriocraniidae, Hepialidae; Nepticuloidea: Nepticulidae, Opostegidae; Incurvarioidea: Heliozelidae, Adelidae, Prodoxidae, Incurvariidae; Tischerioidea: Tischeriidae; Tineoidea: Tineidae, Galacticidae, Eriocottidae, Lypusidae, Psychidae; Gracillarioidea: Douglasiidae, Bucculatricidae, Gracillariidae; Yponomeutoidea: Yponomeutidae, Ypsolophidae, Plutellidae, Acrolepiidae, Glyphipterigidae, Heliodinidae, Lyonetiidae, Bedelliidae.
- List of moths of Russia (superfamily Gelechioidea): Gelechioidea: Ethmiidae, Depressariidae, Peleopodidae, Elachistidae, Agonoxenidae, Scythrididae, Xyloryctidae, Chimabachidae, Oecophoridae, Lecithoceridae, Stathmopodidae, Batrachedridae, Coleophoridae, Momphidae, Blastobasidae, Autostichidae, Amphisbatidae, Cosmopterigidae, Chrysopeleiidae, Gelechiidae.
- List of moths of Russia (superfamilies Zygaenoidea to Tortricoidea): Zygaenoidea: Limacodidae, Zygaenidae; Sesioidea: Brachodidae, Sesiidae; Cossoidea: Cossidae; Tortricoidea: Tortricidae.
- List of moths of Russia (superfamilies Choreutoidea to Thyridoidea): Choreutoidea: Choreutidae; Urodoidea: Urodidae; Schreckensteinioidea: Schreckensteiniidae; Epermenioidea: Epermeniidae; Alucitoidea: Alucitidae; Pterophoroidea: Pterophoridae; Copromorphoidea: Carposinidae; Thyridoidea: Thyrididae.
- List of moths of Russia (superfamilies Pyraloidea to Drepanoidea): Pyraloidea: Pyralidae, Crambidae; Cimelioidea: Cimeliidae; Calliduloidae: Callidulidae; Drepanoidea: Epicopeiidae, Thyatiridae, Drepanidae.
- List of moths of Russia (superfamilies Geometroidea and Bombycoidea): Geometroidea: Uraniidae, Geometridae; Bombycoidea: Lasiocampidae, Bombycidae, Endromididae, Saturniidae, Lemoniidae, Brahmaeidae, Sphingidae.
- List of moths of Russia (superfamily Noctuoidea): Noctuoidea: Notodontidae, Lymantriidae, Noctuidae, Micronoctuidae, Arctiidae, Syntomidae.

== See also ==
- List of butterflies of Russia
- List of butterflies of Saint Petersburg and Leningrad Oblast
