= Stenoptilia saigusai =

Scientific classification
- Kingdom: Animalia
- Phylum: Arthropoda
- Clade: Pancrustacea
- Class: Insecta
- Order: Lepidoptera
- Family: Pterophoridae
- Genus: Stenoptilia
- Species: S. saigusai

Binomial name
- Stenoptilia saigusai Yano, 1963

Species of plume moth

Stenoptilia saigusai is a moth of the family Pterophoridae. It is found on the island of Honshu in Japan.

The length of the forewings is 9–10 mm.
