= Stenoptilia columbia =

Scientific classification
- Kingdom: Animalia
- Phylum: Arthropoda
- Clade: Pancrustacea
- Class: Insecta
- Order: Lepidoptera
- Family: Pterophoridae
- Genus: Stenoptilia
- Species: S. columbia

Binomial name
- Stenoptilia columbia McDunnough, 1927

Species of plume moth

Stenoptilia columbia is a moth of the family Pterophoridae. It is found in Alberta and British Columbia.
