= Stenoptilia balsami =

Scientific classification
- Kingdom: Animalia
- Phylum: Arthropoda
- Clade: Pancrustacea
- Class: Insecta
- Order: Lepidoptera
- Family: Pterophoridae
- Genus: Stenoptilia
- Species: S. balsami

Binomial name
- Stenoptilia balsami Arenberger, 2010

Species of plume moth

Stenoptilia balsami is a moth of the family Pterophoridae. It is known from Yemen.
