= Procapperia orientalis =

Scientific classification
- Kingdom: Animalia
- Phylum: Arthropoda
- Class: Insecta
- Order: Lepidoptera
- Family: Pterophoridae
- Genus: Procapperia
- Species: P. orientalis

Binomial name
- Procapperia orientalis Arenberger, 1988

Species of plume moth

Procapperia orientalis is a moth of the family Pterophoridae. It is found in India (Kashmir) and Kyrgyzstan.

The wingspan is 14–17 mm. The forewings and hindwings are brown. Adults have been recorded in July.
