= Tabulaephorus parthicus =

Scientific classification
- Kingdom: Animalia
- Phylum: Arthropoda
- Clade: Pancrustacea
- Class: Insecta
- Order: Lepidoptera
- Family: Pterophoridae
- Genus: Tabulaephorus
- Species: T. parthicus

Binomial name
- Tabulaephorus parthicus (Lederer, 1870)

Synonyms
- Pterophorus parthicus Lederer, 1870

Species of plume moth

Tabulaephorus parthicus is a moth of the family Pterophoridae. It is found in Asia Minor, Iran, Jordan, Syria and Afghanistan.

The wingspan is about 22 mm. The adults are on wing in August.
