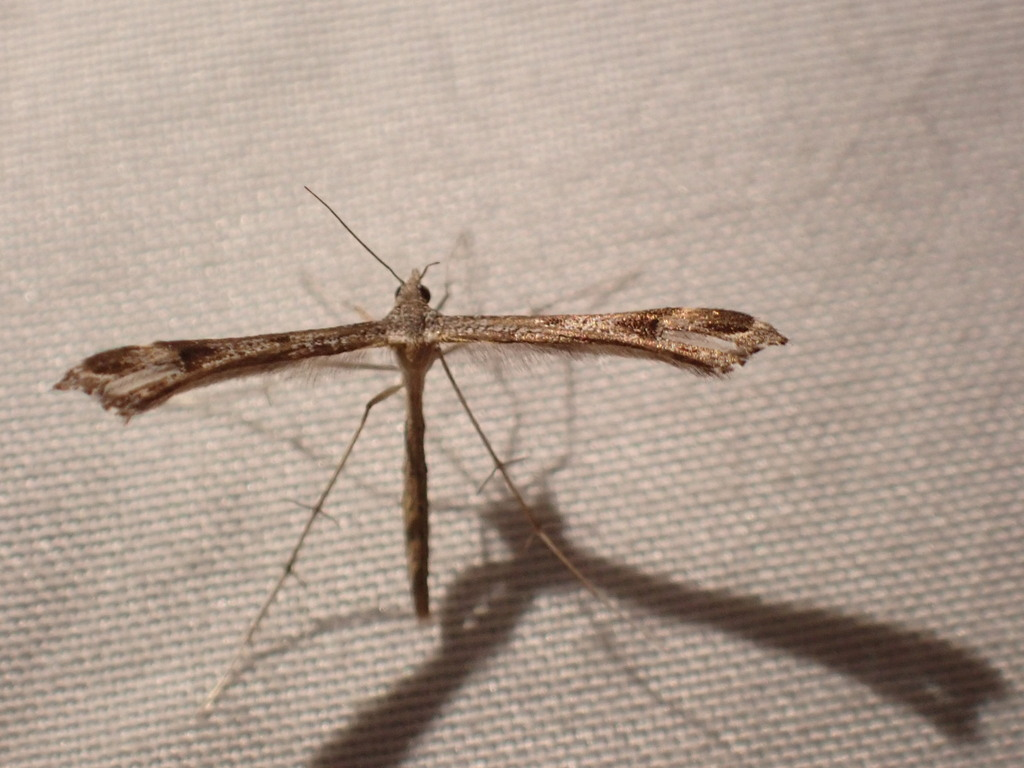

Scientific classification
- Kingdom: Animalia
- Phylum: Arthropoda
- Clade: Pancrustacea
- Class: Insecta
- Order: Lepidoptera
- Family: Pterophoridae
- Genus: Stenoptilia
- Species: S. exclamationis

Binomial name
- Stenoptilia exclamationis (Walsingham, 1880)

Synonyms
- Mimeseoptilus exclamationis Walsingham, 1880

= Stenoptilia exclamationis =

Species of plume moth

Stenoptilia exclamationis is a moth of the family Pterophoridae. It is found in the United States and the UnitedKingdom (including California and Oregon).

Its wingspan is about 22 mm. The head and palpi are gray, with brown scales on the sides and beneath the palpi. The thorax is gray, with a brown spot on the top, and the antennae are brownish gray. The abdomen is ocherous brown and the legs brownish are above and whitish beneath. The forewings are gray, sprinkled with fuscous. The costa is fuscous and there is a row of fuscous spots and a small fuscous dash under the costa before the middle. Two fuscous spots are located before the end of the fissure, and beyond them, on the first lobe, a fuscous dash, pointing toward the upper spot, both together forming an exclamation point. Above, the costa is spotted with fuscous. The fringes around the fissure are white. Along the outer margin they are cinereous (ash-gray), with a fuscous line at their base, but interrupted with white on the middle of the anterior and at the upper angle of the posterior lobe. The hindwings are fuscous, with brownish scales. The fringes are brownish.
