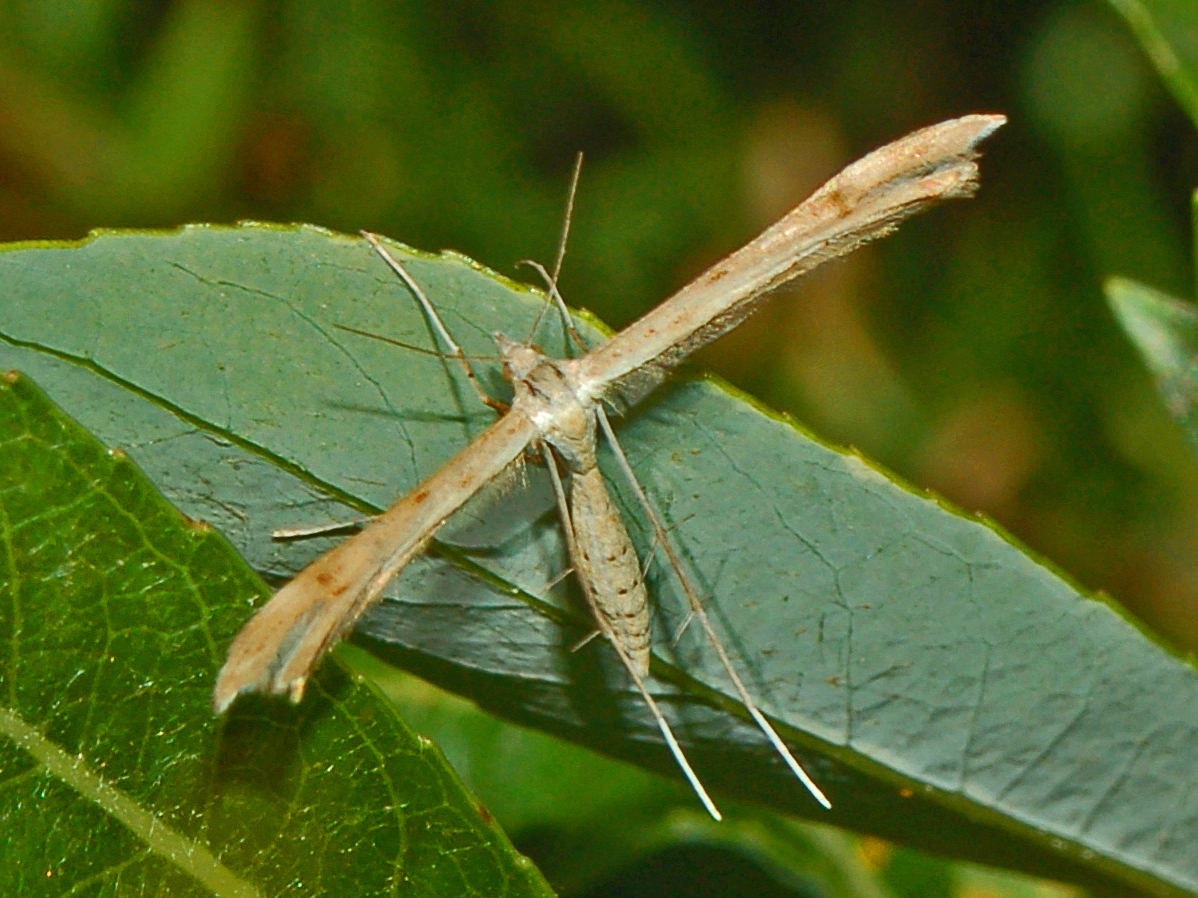
- Stenoptilia species

Scientific classification
- Kingdom: Animalia
- Phylum: Arthropoda
- Clade: Pancrustacea
- Class: Insecta
- Order: Lepidoptera
- Family: Pterophoridae
- Tribe: Platyptiliini
- Genus: Stenoptilia; Hübner, [1825]

Synonyms
- Mimaeseoptilus Wallengren, 1862; Mimeseoptilus Zeller, 1867; Adkinia Tutt, 1905; Mimaesoptilus Snellen, 1884 (missp.); Adkina Yano, 1963 (missp.)

= Stenoptilia =

Plume moth genus

Stenoptilia is a genus of moths in the family Pterophoridae.

== Species ==
The genus contains the following species:

- Stenoptilia admiranda Yano, 1963
- Stenoptilia aethiopica Gibeaux, 1994
- Stenoptilia aktashiensis Gibeaux, 1997
- Stenoptilia alaii Gibeaux, 1995
- Stenoptilia albilimbata Yano, 1963
- Stenoptilia amseli Arenberger, 1990
- Stenoptilia annadactyla Sutter, 1988
- Stenoptilia aridus (Zeller, 1847)
- Stenoptilia atlanticola Zerny, 1936
- Stenoptilia balsami Arenberger, 2010
- Stenoptilia bandamae Bigot, 1964
- Stenoptilia bassii Arenberger, 2002
- Stenoptilia bipunctidactyla (Scopoli, 1763)
- Stenoptilia caradjai Gibeaux, 1995
- Stenoptilia caroli Arenberger, 1988
- Stenoptilia cercelegica Fazekas, 2003
- Stenoptilia coenei Gielis, 2000
- Stenoptilia columbia McDunnough, 1927
- Stenoptilia coloradensis Fernald, 1898
- Stenoptilia conicephala Gielis, 1990
- Stenoptilia convexa Arenberger, 1998
- Stenoptilia coprodactylus (Stainton, 1851)
- Stenoptilia dolini Arenberger, 2007
- Stenoptilia dubatolovi Ustjuzhanin, 2001
- Stenoptilia eborinodactyla Zagulajev, 1986
- Stenoptilia elkefi Arenberger, 1984
- Stenoptilia etcetera Arenberger, 1998
- Stenoptilia exclamationis (Walsingham, 1880)
- Stenoptilia friedeli Arenberger, 1984
- Stenoptilia grandipuncta McDunnough, 1939
- Stenoptilia graphodactyla (Treitschke, 1833)
- Stenoptilia gratiolae Gibeaux & Nel, 1990
- Stenoptilia hahni Arenberger, 1989
- Stenoptilia harhorina Fazekas, 2003
- Stenoptilia himachala Arenberger, 1999
- Stenoptilia inexpectata Gibeaux, 1995
- Stenoptilia ionota Meyrick, 1920
- Stenoptilia islandicus (Staudinger, 1857)
- Stenoptilia jacutica Ustjuzhanin, 1996
- Stenoptilia johnistella Ustjuzhanin et Kovtunovich, 2010
- Stenoptilia karsholti Gielis, 1995
- Stenoptilia kiitulo Gielis, 2008
- Stenoptilia kirghizica Zagulajev, 2002
- Stenoptilia kosterini Ustjuzhanin, 2001
- Stenoptilia kurushensis Kovtunovich, 2001
- Stenoptilia latistriga Rebel, 1916
- Stenoptilia leuconephes (Meyrick, 1886)
- Stenoptilia lucasi Arenberger, 1990
- Stenoptilia lutescens (Herrich-Schäffer, 1855)
- Stenoptilia luteocinereus (Snellen, 1884)
- Stenoptilia madyana Arenberger, 1999
- Stenoptilia mannii (Zeller, 1852)
- Stenoptilia melanoloncha Meyrick, 1927
- Stenoptilia mengeli Fernald, 1898
- Stenoptilia meyeri Gielis, 1997
- Stenoptilia millieridactyla (Bruand, 1861)
- Stenoptilia mimula Gibeaux, 1985
- Stenoptilia molleti Gibeaux, 1991
- Stenoptilia murzini Gibeaux, 1995
- Stenoptilia naryna Arenberger & Buchsbaum, 2000
- Stenoptilia natalensis Ustjuzhanin et Kovtunovich, 2010
- Stenoptilia neblina Gielis, 1995
- Stenoptilia nepetellae Bigot & Picard, 1983
- Stenoptilia nolckeni (Tengström, 1869)
- Stenoptilia nurolhaki Amsel, 1967
- Stenoptilia orites (Meyrick, 1884)
- Stenoptilia pallistriga Barnes & McDunnough, 1913
- Stenoptilia parnasia Arenberger, 1986
- Stenoptilia pelidnodactyla (Stein, 1837)
- Stenoptilia petraea Meyrick, 1908
- Stenoptilia phaeonephes (Meyrick, 1886)
- Stenoptilia pinarodactyla (Erschoff, 1877)
- Stenoptilia pinkeri Arenberger, 1984
- Stenoptilia platanodes Meyrick, 1914
- Stenoptilia pneumonanthes (Büttner, 1880)
- Stenoptilia poculi Arenberger, 1998
- Stenoptilia pterodactyla (Linnaeus, 1761)
- Stenoptilia reisseri Rebel, 1935
- Stenoptilia rougeoti Gibeaux, 1994
- Stenoptilia saigusai Yano, 1963
- Stenoptilia sanaa Arenberger, 1999
- Stenoptilia scoprodactyla Zagulajev, 1986
- Stenoptilia stigmatodactylus (Zeller, 1852)
- Stenoptilia stigmatoides Sutter & Skyva, 1992
- Stenoptilia suprema Meyrick, 1926
- Stenoptilia tenuis (Felder & Rogenhofer, 1875)
- Stenoptilia transversata Gibeaux, 1995
- Stenoptilia tyropiesta Meyrick, 1932
- Stenoptilia veronicae Karvonen, 1932
- Stenoptilia viettei Gibeaux, 1994
- Stenoptilia wagneri Zerny, 1940
- Stenoptilia zophodactylus (Duponchel, 1840)

== Species of unknown status ==
- Stenoptilia nivea Sahlberg, 1912
- Stenoptilia stenodactyla Turati & Fiori, 1930, described from Greece.
