= Stenoptilia cercelegica =

Scientific classification
- Kingdom: Animalia
- Phylum: Arthropoda
- Clade: Pancrustacea
- Class: Insecta
- Order: Lepidoptera
- Family: Pterophoridae
- Genus: Stenoptilia
- Species: S. cercelegica

Binomial name
- Stenoptilia cercelegica Fazekas, 2003

Species of plume moth

Stenoptilia cercelegica is a moth of the family Pterophoridae. It is found in Mongolia (Arhangaj, Cerceleg).

The wingspan is 14–15 mm. The forewings are brown with some sprinkled white scales. Adults are on wing in August.
