= Stenoptilia bassii =

Scientific classification
- Kingdom: Animalia
- Phylum: Arthropoda
- Clade: Pancrustacea
- Class: Insecta
- Order: Lepidoptera
- Family: Pterophoridae
- Genus: Stenoptilia
- Species: S. bassii

Binomial name
- Stenoptilia bassii Arenberger, 2002

Species of plume moth

Stenoptilia bassii is a moth of the family Pterophoridae. It is found in Italy, where it was discovered in the Aosta Valley.
