= Stenoptilia mimula =

Scientific classification
- Kingdom: Animalia
- Phylum: Arthropoda
- Clade: Pancrustacea
- Class: Insecta
- Order: Lepidoptera
- Family: Pterophoridae
- Genus: Stenoptilia
- Species: S. mimula

Binomial name
- Stenoptilia mimula Gibeaux, 1985

Species of plume moth

Stenoptilia mimula is a moth of the family Pterophoridae. It is found in Spain, France and Italy.
