= Stenoptilia caroli =

Scientific classification
- Kingdom: Animalia
- Phylum: Arthropoda
- Clade: Pancrustacea
- Class: Insecta
- Order: Lepidoptera
- Family: Pterophoridae
- Genus: Stenoptilia
- Species: S. caroli

Binomial name
- Stenoptilia caroli Arenberger, 1988

Species of plume moth

Stenoptilia caroli is a moth of the family Pterophoridae. It is found in Nepal and China along with India (Kashmir).

The wingspan is 15–16 mm. Adults have been recorded in July.
