= Stenoptilia lucasi =

Scientific classification
- Kingdom: Animalia
- Phylum: Arthropoda
- Clade: Pancrustacea
- Class: Insecta
- Order: Lepidoptera
- Family: Pterophoridae
- Genus: Stenoptilia
- Species: S. lucasi

Binomial name
- Stenoptilia lucasi Arenberger, 1990

Species of plume moth

Stenoptilia lucasi is a moth of the family Pterophoridae. It is found in Greece, Cyprus, Turkey and Iran.
