= Stenoptilia dolini =

Scientific classification
- Kingdom: Animalia
- Phylum: Arthropoda
- Clade: Pancrustacea
- Class: Insecta
- Order: Lepidoptera
- Family: Pterophoridae
- Genus: Stenoptilia
- Species: S. dolini

Binomial name
- Stenoptilia dolini Arenberger, 2007

Species of plume moth

Stenoptilia dolini is a moth of the family Pterophoridae. It is found in Georgia (the Zikazskyj Pass).
