= Stenoptilia coenei =

Scientific classification
- Kingdom: Animalia
- Phylum: Arthropoda
- Clade: Pancrustacea
- Class: Insecta
- Order: Lepidoptera
- Family: Pterophoridae
- Genus: Stenoptilia
- Species: S. coenei

Binomial name
- Stenoptilia coenei Gielis, 2000

Species of plume moth

Stenoptilia coenei is a moth of the family Pterophoridae. It is found in Terskey Alatau, Kyrgyzstan.

Adults have been recorded in July at an altitude of 3,000 to 3,200 meters.
