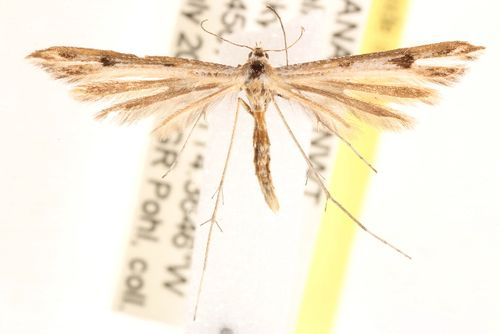

Scientific classification
- Kingdom: Animalia
- Phylum: Arthropoda
- Clade: Pancrustacea
- Class: Insecta
- Order: Lepidoptera
- Family: Pterophoridae
- Genus: Stenoptilia
- Species: S. mengeli

Binomial name
- Stenoptilia mengeli Fernald, 1898

= Stenoptilia mengeli =

Species of plume moth

Stenoptilia mengeli is a moth of the family Pterophoridae. It is found in Greenland and Nunavut, Canada.

The wingspan is about 20 mm. The head, palpi, thorax, abdomen and legs are dark ashy grey. A fine white line occurs over each eye. The forewings are ashy grey and glistening. There are a few dark fuscous scales on the first lobe, forming an ill-defined longitudinal stripe on the middle. There is also a fuscous spot at the end of the cleft and a less distinct one on the middle of the cell. The hindwings are ashy grey.

Among Stenoptilia species, the lowest interspecific divergence was between Stenoptilia mengeli and Stenoptilia islandicus.
