= Stenoptilia wagneri =

Scientific classification
- Kingdom: Animalia
- Phylum: Arthropoda
- Clade: Pancrustacea
- Class: Insecta
- Order: Lepidoptera
- Family: Pterophoridae
- Genus: Stenoptilia
- Species: S. wagneri

Binomial name
- Stenoptilia wagneri Zerny, 1940

Species of plume moth

Stenoptilia wagneri is a moth of the family Pterophoridae. It is found in Iran.
