= Tabulaephorus djebeli =

Scientific classification
- Kingdom: Animalia
- Phylum: Arthropoda
- Class: Insecta
- Order: Lepidoptera
- Family: Pterophoridae
- Genus: Tabulaephorus
- Species: T. djebeli

Binomial name
- Tabulaephorus djebeli (Arenberger, 1981)

Synonyms
- Pterophorus djebeli Arenberger, 1981

Species of plume moth

Tabulaephorus djebeli is a moth of the family Pterophoridae. It is found in Fars province in southern Iran.

The wingspan is about 25 mm. The forewings are creamy white.
