= Procapperia pelecyntes =

Scientific classification
- Kingdom: Animalia
- Phylum: Arthropoda
- Class: Insecta
- Order: Lepidoptera
- Family: Pterophoridae
- Genus: Procapperia
- Species: P. pelecyntes

Binomial name
- Procapperia pelecyntes (Meyrick, 1908)

Synonyms
- Oxyptilus pelecyntes Meyrick, 1908

Species of plume moth

Procapperia pelecyntes is a moth of the family Pterophoridae. It is known from Japan (Kyushu), China, India and Sri Lanka.

The length of the forewings is 7–8 mm. Adults emerge from May to November in Japan.

The larvae feed on Scutellaria indica.
