= Tabulaephorus narynus =

Scientific classification
- Kingdom: Animalia
- Phylum: Arthropoda
- Class: Insecta
- Order: Lepidoptera
- Family: Pterophoridae
- Subfamily: Pterophorinae
- Tribe: Pterophorini
- Genus: Tabulaephorus
- Species: T. narynus

Binomial name
- Tabulaephorus narynus Arenberger, 1993

Species of plume moth

Tabulaephorus narynus is a moth of the family Pterophoridae. It is found in Kyrgyzstan, Tajikistan, and Uzbekistan. It occurs at high altitudes. Specimens have been found in July and August.
