= Procapperia hackeri =

Scientific classification
- Kingdom: Animalia
- Phylum: Arthropoda
- Class: Insecta
- Order: Lepidoptera
- Family: Pterophoridae
- Genus: Procapperia
- Species: P. hackeri

Binomial name
- Procapperia hackeri Arenberger, 2002

Species of plume moth

Procapperia hackeri is a moth of the family Pterophoridae. It is known from Yemen.
