= Stenoptilia hahni =

Scientific classification
- Kingdom: Animalia
- Phylum: Arthropoda
- Clade: Pancrustacea
- Class: Insecta
- Order: Lepidoptera
- Family: Pterophoridae
- Genus: Stenoptilia
- Species: S. hahni

Binomial name
- Stenoptilia hahni Arenberger, 1989

Species of plume moth

Stenoptilia hahni is a moth of the family Pterophoridae. It is found in Spain.
