= Stenoptilia dubatolovi =

Scientific classification
- Kingdom: Animalia
- Phylum: Arthropoda
- Clade: Pancrustacea
- Class: Insecta
- Order: Lepidoptera
- Family: Pterophoridae
- Genus: Stenoptilia
- Species: S. dubatolovi

Binomial name
- Stenoptilia dubatolovi Ustjuzhanin, 2001

Species of plume moth

Stenoptilia dubatolovi is a moth belonging to the family of Pterophoridae. It is found in Turkmenistan.
