= Stenoptilia aktashiensis =

Scientific classification
- Kingdom: Animalia
- Phylum: Arthropoda
- Clade: Pancrustacea
- Class: Insecta
- Order: Lepidoptera
- Family: Pterophoridae
- Genus: Stenoptilia
- Species: S. aktashiensis

Binomial name
- Stenoptilia aktashiensis Gibeaux, 1997

Species of plume moth

Stenoptilia aktashiensis is a moth of the family Pterophoridae found in Central Asia.
