= Stenoptilia scoprodactyla =

Scientific classification
- Kingdom: Animalia
- Phylum: Arthropoda
- Clade: Pancrustacea
- Class: Insecta
- Order: Lepidoptera
- Family: Pterophoridae
- Genus: Stenoptilia
- Species: S. scoprodactyla

Binomial name
- Stenoptilia scoprodactyla Zagulajev, 1986

Species of plume moth

Stenoptilia scoprodactyla is a moth of the family Pterophoridae. It is found in Russia.
