= Stenoptilia neblina =

Scientific classification
- Kingdom: Animalia
- Phylum: Arthropoda
- Clade: Pancrustacea
- Class: Insecta
- Order: Lepidoptera
- Family: Pterophoridae
- Genus: Stenoptilia
- Species: S. neblina

Binomial name
- Stenoptilia neblina Gielis, 1995

Species of plume moth

Stenoptilia neblina is a moth of the family Pterophoridae. It is known from Venezuela.

Its wingspan is about 21 mm. Adults are on wing in February.

Its host plant is unknown, but an adult was collected near Tyleria and Bonnetia plants.
