= Stenoptilia bandamae =

Scientific classification
- Kingdom: Animalia
- Phylum: Arthropoda
- Clade: Pancrustacea
- Class: Insecta
- Order: Lepidoptera
- Family: Pterophoridae
- Genus: Stenoptilia
- Species: S. bandamae

Binomial name
- Stenoptilia bandamae Bigot, 1964

Species of plume moth

Stenoptilia bandamae is a moth of the family Pterophoridae. It is known from Ivory Coast.
