= Friedrich Otto Büttner =

German entomologist

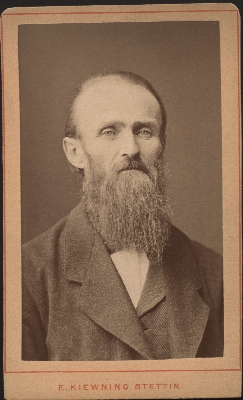
Friedrich Otto Büttner

Friedrich Otto Büttner (1824 Garz – 1880 Grabow) was a German entomologist who specialised in Lepidoptera . He wrote the original description of Stenoptilia pneumonanthes in Die Pommerschen, insbesondere die Stettiner Microlepidoptern. Entomologische Zeitung 41: 383–473. Stettin. (1880).Friedrich Büttner was a Member of the Stettin Entomological Society. By profession he was a teacher.
