= Stenoptilia melanoloncha =

Scientific classification
- Kingdom: Animalia
- Phylum: Arthropoda
- Clade: Pancrustacea
- Class: Insecta
- Order: Lepidoptera
- Family: Pterophoridae
- Genus: Stenoptilia
- Species: S. melanoloncha

Binomial name
- Stenoptilia melanoloncha Meyrick, 1927

Species of plume moth

Stenoptilia melanoloncha is a moth of the family Pterophoridae. It is known from Kenya.
