= Stenoptilia transversata =

Scientific classification
- Kingdom: Animalia
- Phylum: Arthropoda
- Clade: Pancrustacea
- Class: Insecta
- Order: Lepidoptera
- Family: Pterophoridae
- Genus: Stenoptilia
- Species: S. transversata

Binomial name
- Stenoptilia transversata Gibeaux, 1995

Species of plume moth

Stenoptilia transversata is a moth of the family Pterophoridae.
