= Stenoptilia madyana =

Scientific classification
- Kingdom: Animalia
- Phylum: Arthropoda
- Clade: Pancrustacea
- Class: Insecta
- Order: Lepidoptera
- Family: Pterophoridae
- Genus: Stenoptilia
- Species: S. madyana

Binomial name
- Stenoptilia madyana Arenberger, 1999

Species of plume moth

Stenoptilia madyana is a moth of the family Pterophoridae. It is found in Pakistan.

The wingspan is about 19 mm.
