= Procapperia ankaraica =

Scientific classification
- Kingdom: Animalia
- Phylum: Arthropoda
- Class: Insecta
- Order: Lepidoptera
- Family: Pterophoridae
- Genus: Procapperia
- Species: P. ankaraica

Binomial name
- Procapperia ankaraica Fazekas, 2003

Species of plume moth

Procapperia ankaraica is a moth of the family Pterophoridae that is endemic to Turkey.

The wingspan is about 14 millimetres (0.55 in). The forewings are brown. Adults are on wing in May.
