= Stenoptilia conicephala =

Scientific classification
- Kingdom: Animalia
- Phylum: Arthropoda
- Clade: Pancrustacea
- Class: Insecta
- Order: Lepidoptera
- Family: Pterophoridae
- Genus: Stenoptilia
- Species: S. conicephala

Binomial name
- Stenoptilia conicephala Gielis, 1990

Species of plume moth

Stenoptilia conicephala is a moth of the family Pterophoridae. It is known from Kenya.
