= Stenoptilia himachala =

Scientific classification
- Kingdom: Animalia
- Phylum: Arthropoda
- Clade: Pancrustacea
- Class: Insecta
- Order: Lepidoptera
- Family: Pterophoridae
- Genus: Stenoptilia
- Species: S. himachala

Binomial name
- Stenoptilia himachala Arenberger, 1999

Species of plume moth

Stenoptilia himachala is a moth of the family Pterophoridae. It is found in Himachal Pradesh, India.

The wingspan is 14–20 mm.
