= Tabulaephorus sesamitis =

Scientific classification
- Kingdom: Animalia
- Phylum: Arthropoda
- Class: Insecta
- Order: Lepidoptera
- Family: Pterophoridae
- Genus: Tabulaephorus
- Species: T. sesamitis

Binomial name
- Tabulaephorus sesamitis (Meyrick, 1905)

Synonyms
- Alucita sesamitis Meyrick, 1905; Calyciphora sesamitis

Species of plume moth

Tabulaephorus sesamitis is a moth of the family Pterophoridae. It is found in India and eastern Afghanistan.
