= Stenoptilia elkefi =

Scientific classification
- Kingdom: Animalia
- Phylum: Arthropoda
- Clade: Pancrustacea
- Class: Insecta
- Order: Lepidoptera
- Family: Pterophoridae
- Genus: Stenoptilia
- Species: S. elkefi

Binomial name
- Stenoptilia elkefi Arenberger, 1984

Species of plume moth

Stenoptilia elkefi is a moth of the family Pterophoridae. It is known from Tunisia, Cyprus, southern Europe, Jordan, Turkey, Turkmenistan and Yemen.

The wingspan is 17–19 mm.
