= Stenoptilia molleti =

Scientific classification
- Kingdom: Animalia
- Phylum: Arthropoda
- Clade: Pancrustacea
- Class: Insecta
- Order: Lepidoptera
- Family: Pterophoridae
- Genus: Stenoptilia
- Species: S. molleti

Binomial name
- Stenoptilia molleti Gibeaux, 1991

Species of plume moth

Stenoptilia molleti is a moth of the family Pterophoridae. It is found in Pakistan.
