= Tabulaephorus thomasi =

Scientific classification
- Kingdom: Animalia
- Phylum: Arthropoda
- Class: Insecta
- Order: Lepidoptera
- Family: Pterophoridae
- Genus: Tabulaephorus
- Species: T. thomasi

Binomial name
- Tabulaephorus thomasi Arenberger, 1993

Species of plume moth

Tabulaephorus thomasi is a moth of the family Pterophoridae. It is found in Afghanistan.
