= Stenoptilia grandipuncta =

Scientific classification
- Kingdom: Animalia
- Phylum: Arthropoda
- Clade: Pancrustacea
- Class: Insecta
- Order: Lepidoptera
- Family: Pterophoridae
- Genus: Stenoptilia
- Species: S. grandipuncta

Binomial name
- Stenoptilia grandipuncta McDunnough, 1939

Species of plume moth

Stenoptilia grandipuncta is a moth of the family Pterophoridae. It is found in Canada, including Manitoba.
