= Tabulaephorus punctinervis =

Scientific classification
- Kingdom: Animalia
- Phylum: Arthropoda
- Class: Insecta
- Order: Lepidoptera
- Family: Pterophoridae
- Genus: Tabulaephorus
- Species: T. punctinervis

Binomial name
- Tabulaephorus punctinervis (Constant, 1885)

Synonyms
- Aciptilia punctinervis Constant, 1885; Calyciphora punctinervis; Alucita tyrrhenica Amsel, 1954

Species of plume moth

Tabulaephorus punctinervis is a moth of the family Pterophoridae. It is found on the Iberian Peninsula and in France, Italy, as well as on Sardinia, Corsica, Sicily, Cyprus and the Canary Islands. It is also known from Turkey.

The wingspan is 16–19 mm.

The larvae feed on Carlina corymbosa.
