= Stenoptilia kirghizica =

Scientific classification
- Kingdom: Animalia
- Phylum: Arthropoda
- Clade: Pancrustacea
- Class: Insecta
- Order: Lepidoptera
- Family: Pterophoridae
- Genus: Stenoptilia
- Species: S. kirghizica

Binomial name
- Stenoptilia kirghizica Zagulajev, 2002

Species of plume moth

Stenoptilia kirghizica is a moth of the family Pterophoridae which is endemic to Kirghizia.
