= Stenoptilia leuconephes =

Scientific classification
- Kingdom: Animalia
- Phylum: Arthropoda
- Clade: Pancrustacea
- Class: Insecta
- Order: Lepidoptera
- Family: Pterophoridae
- Genus: Stenoptilia
- Species: S. leuconephes

Binomial name
- Stenoptilia leuconephes (Meyrick, 1886)

Synonyms
- Mimeseoptilus leuconephes Meyrick, 1886

Species of plume moth

Stenoptilia leuconephes is an Australian alpine moth species in the family Pterophoridae described in 1885 and published in 1886 by Edward Meyrick from a specimen collected on Mount Kosciuszko in January. It is found in Australia, including Tasmania.
