= Stenoptilia nepetellae =

Scientific classification
- Kingdom: Animalia
- Phylum: Arthropoda
- Clade: Pancrustacea
- Class: Insecta
- Order: Lepidoptera
- Family: Pterophoridae
- Genus: Stenoptilia
- Species: S. nepetellae

Binomial name
- Stenoptilia nepetellae Bigot & Picard, 1983

Synonyms
- Stenoptilia cyrnea Nel, 1991

Species of plume moth

Stenoptilia nepetellae is a moth of the family Pterophoridae. It is found in Spain and France.

The larvae feed on lesser cat-mint (Nepeta nepetella) and Nepeta agrestis.
