= Stenoptilia ionota =

Scientific classification
- Kingdom: Animalia
- Phylum: Arthropoda
- Clade: Pancrustacea
- Class: Insecta
- Order: Lepidoptera
- Family: Pterophoridae
- Genus: Stenoptilia
- Species: S. ionota

Binomial name
- Stenoptilia ionota Meyrick, 1920

Species of plume moth

Stenoptilia ionota is a moth of the family Pterophoridae. It is known from Kenya.
