= Stenoptilia pinkeri =

Scientific classification
- Kingdom: Animalia
- Phylum: Arthropoda
- Clade: Pancrustacea
- Class: Insecta
- Order: Lepidoptera
- Family: Pterophoridae
- Genus: Stenoptilia
- Species: S. pinkeri

Binomial name
- Stenoptilia pinkeri Arenberger, 1984

Species of plume moth

Stenoptilia pinkeri is a moth of the family Pterophoridae. It is known from Turkey.

The wingspan is 16–24 mm.
