= Tabulaephorus maracandicus =

Scientific classification
- Kingdom: Animalia
- Phylum: Arthropoda
- Class: Insecta
- Order: Lepidoptera
- Family: Pterophoridae
- Genus: Tabulaephorus
- Species: T. maracandicus

Binomial name
- Tabulaephorus maracandicus Arenberger & Buchsbaum, 1998

Species of plume moth

Tabulaephorus maracandicus is a moth of the family Pterophoridae. It is found in Tajikistan and Uzbekistan. The species was first described in 1998, by Ernst Arenberger and Ulf Buchsbaum, from two female specimens from Uzbekistan. An additional specimen was described from Tajikistan in 2001. Male genitalia were first described in 2022.

The wingspan is about 24 mm. Adults have been recorded in July.
