= Stenoptilia harhorina =

Scientific classification
- Kingdom: Animalia
- Phylum: Arthropoda
- Clade: Pancrustacea
- Class: Insecta
- Order: Lepidoptera
- Family: Pterophoridae
- Genus: Stenoptilia
- Species: S. harhorina

Binomial name
- Stenoptilia harhorina Fazekas, 2003

Species of plume moth

Stenoptilia harhorina is a moth of the family Pterophoridae. It is found in Mongolia (Kharkhorin mountains and Ulanbator West).

The wingspan is 15–16 mm. The forewings are brown with a slight red shine. Adults are on wing from July to August.
