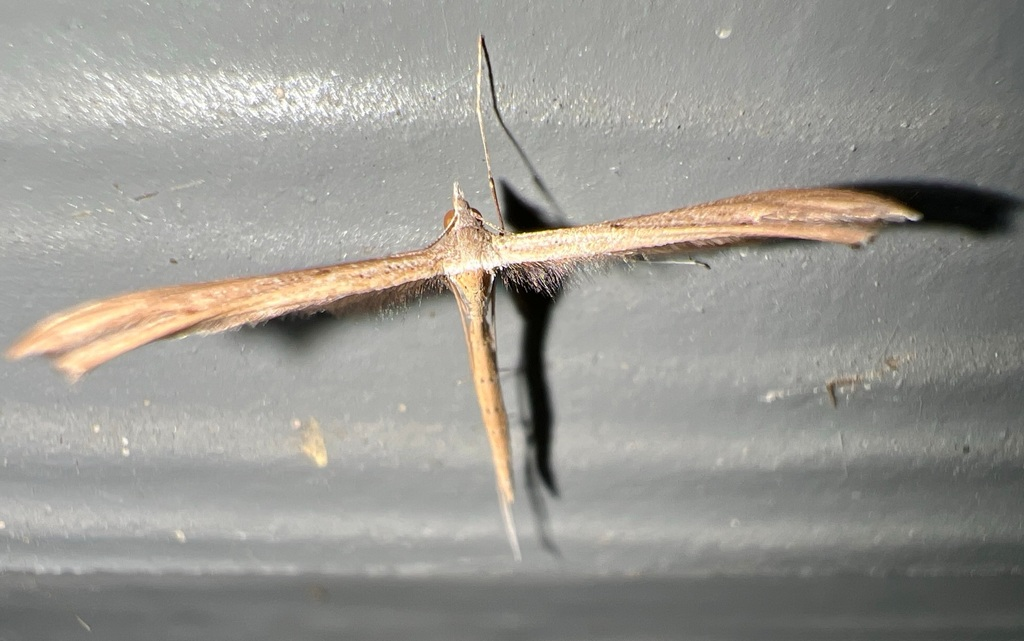

Scientific classification
- Kingdom: Animalia
- Phylum: Arthropoda
- Clade: Pancrustacea
- Class: Insecta
- Order: Lepidoptera
- Family: Pterophoridae
- Genus: Stenoptilia
- Species: S. pallistriga

Binomial name
- Stenoptilia pallistriga Barnes & McDunnough, 1913

= Stenoptilia pallistriga =

Species of plume moth

Stenoptilia pallistriga is a moth of the family Pterophoridae described by William Barnes and James Halliday McDunnough in 1913. It is known from Dominica, Ecuador, Jamaica, Paraguay and Suriname. It is also found in the United States in Florida and Mississippi.

The wingspan is 14–16 mm. Adults are on wing from February to June, from August to October and in December.
