= Stenoptilia gratiolae =

Scientific classification
- Kingdom: Animalia
- Phylum: Arthropoda
- Clade: Pancrustacea
- Class: Insecta
- Order: Lepidoptera
- Family: Pterophoridae
- Genus: Stenoptilia
- Species: S. gratiolae

Binomial name
- Stenoptilia gratiolae Gibeaux & Nel, 1990

Synonyms
- Stenoptilia paludicola auct., nec Wallengren, 1862

Species of plume moth

Stenoptilia gratiolae is a species of moth of the family Pterophoridae. It is found in many countries throughout Eurasia, including Jordan, western Russia, Ukraine, Bulgaria, Sweden, and Norway.

The wingspan is 19–22 mm.

The larvae feed on Gratiola officinalis.
