= Stenoptilia meyeri =

Conservation status
- Critically Endangered (IUCN 3.1)

Scientific classification
- Kingdom: Animalia
- Phylum: Arthropoda
- Clade: Pancrustacea
- Class: Insecta
- Order: Lepidoptera
- Family: Pterophoridae
- Genus: Stenoptilia
- Species: S. meyeri

Binomial name
- Stenoptilia meyeri Gielis, 1997

Species of plume moth

Stenoptilia meyeri is a moth of the family Pterophoridae found on the Azores. It was first described by Cees Gielis in 1997.
