= Stenoptilia nurolhaki =

Scientific classification
- Kingdom: Animalia
- Phylum: Arthropoda
- Clade: Pancrustacea
- Class: Insecta
- Order: Lepidoptera
- Family: Pterophoridae
- Genus: Stenoptilia
- Species: S. nurolhaki

Binomial name
- Stenoptilia nurolhaki Amsel, 1967

Species of plume moth

Stenoptilia nurolhaki is a moth of the family Pterophoridae. It is known from Asia, including Mongolia.
