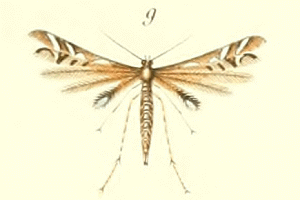
- Procapperia maculatus

Scientific classification
- Kingdom: Animalia
- Phylum: Arthropoda
- Class: Insecta
- Order: Lepidoptera
- Family: Pterophoridae
- Subfamily: Pterophorinae
- Tribe: Oxyptilini
- Genus: Procapperia; Adamczewski, 1951

= Procapperia =

Plume moth genus

Procapperia is a genus of moths in the family Pterophoridae.

== Species ==
- Procapperia amira Arenberger, 1988
- Procapperia ankaraica Fazekas, 2003
- Procapperia hackeri Arenberger, 2002
- Procapperia kuldschaensis (Rebel, 1914)
- Procapperia linariae (Chrétien, 1922)
- Procapperia maculatus (Constant, 1865)
- Procapperia orientalis Arenberger, 1998
- Procapperia pelecyntes (Meyrick, 1908)
- Procapperia processidactyla Nupponen, 2022
- Procapperia tadzhica Zagulajev, 2002
