= Stenoptilia petraea =

Scientific classification
- Kingdom: Animalia
- Phylum: Arthropoda
- Clade: Pancrustacea
- Class: Insecta
- Order: Lepidoptera
- Family: Pterophoridae
- Genus: Stenoptilia
- Species: S. petraea

Binomial name
- Stenoptilia petraea Meyrick, 1908

Species of plume moth

Stenoptilia petraea is a moth of the family Pterophoridae. It is known from India and Sri Lanka.

The wingspan is 19–21 mm. The wingspan is 24–27 mm. The head and thorax are greyish-ochreous, with a white line above the eyes. The thorax is sometimes white-sprinkled. The antennae are grey and the abdomen is greyish-ochreous with suffused streaks of white irroration (speckling). The forewings are brownish-ochreous, becoming browner posteriorly, more or less sprinkled irregularly with whitish and blackish. The hindwings are rather dark grey.
