= Tabulaephorus hissaricus =

Scientific classification
- Kingdom: Animalia
- Phylum: Arthropoda
- Class: Insecta
- Order: Lepidoptera
- Family: Pterophoridae
- Genus: Tabulaephorus
- Species: T. hissaricus

Binomial name
- Tabulaephorus hissaricus (Zagulajev, 1986)

Synonyms
- Pterophorus hissaricus Zagulajev, 1986

Species of plume moth

Tabulaephorus hissaricus is a moth of the family Pterophoridae. It is found in Russia.
