= Stenoptilia friedeli =

Scientific classification
- Kingdom: Animalia
- Phylum: Arthropoda
- Clade: Pancrustacea
- Class: Insecta
- Order: Lepidoptera
- Family: Pterophoridae
- Genus: Stenoptilia
- Species: S. friedeli

Binomial name
- Stenoptilia friedeli Arenberger, 1984

Species of plume moth

Stenoptilia friedeli is a moth of the family Pterophoridae. It is found in Morocco.

The wingspan is 25 mm. The forewings and hindwings are yellowish-brown.

== Etymology ==
It is named for Georg Friedel.
