= Tabulaephorus =

Scientific classification
- Kingdom: Animalia
- Phylum: Arthropoda
- Class: Insecta
- Order: Lepidoptera
- Family: Pterophoridae
- Subfamily: Pterophorinae
- Tribe: Pterophorini
- Genus: Tabulaephorus; Arenberger, 1993

Plume moth genus

Tabulaephorus is a genus of moths in the family Pterophoridae.

== Species ==
- Tabulaephorus afghanus (Arenberger, 1981)
- Tabulaephorus decipiens (Lederer, 1870)
- Tabulaephorus djebeli (Arenberger, 1981)
- Tabulaephorus hissaricus (Zagulajev, 1986)
- Tabulaephorus maracandicus Arenberger & Buchsbaum, 1998
- Tabulaephorus marptys (Christoph, 1873)
- Tabulaephorus murzini Gibeaux, 1997
- Tabulaephorus narynus Arenberger, 1993
- Tabulaephorus parthicus (Lederer, 1870)
- Tabulaephorus punctinervis (Constant, 1885)
- Tabulaephorus sesamitis (Meyrick, 1905)
- Tabulaephorus thomasi Arenberger, 1993
- Tabulaephorus ussuriensis (Caradja, 1920)
