= Procapperia amira =

Scientific classification
- Kingdom: Animalia
- Phylum: Arthropoda
- Class: Insecta
- Order: Lepidoptera
- Family: Pterophoridae
- Genus: Procapperia
- Species: P. amira

Binomial name
- Procapperia amira Arenberger, 1988

Species of plume moth

Procapperia amira is a moth of the family Pterophoridae. It is found in Afghanistan.

The wingspan is 20–21 mm. The forewings are brown. Adults have been recorded in July.
