= Tabulaephorus murzini =

Scientific classification
- Kingdom: Animalia
- Phylum: Arthropoda
- Clade: Pancrustacea
- Class: Insecta
- Order: Lepidoptera
- Family: Pterophoridae
- Genus: Tabulaephorus
- Species: T. murzini

Binomial name
- Tabulaephorus murzini Gibeaux, 1997

Species of plume moth

Tabulaephorus murzini is a moth of the family Pterophoridae.
