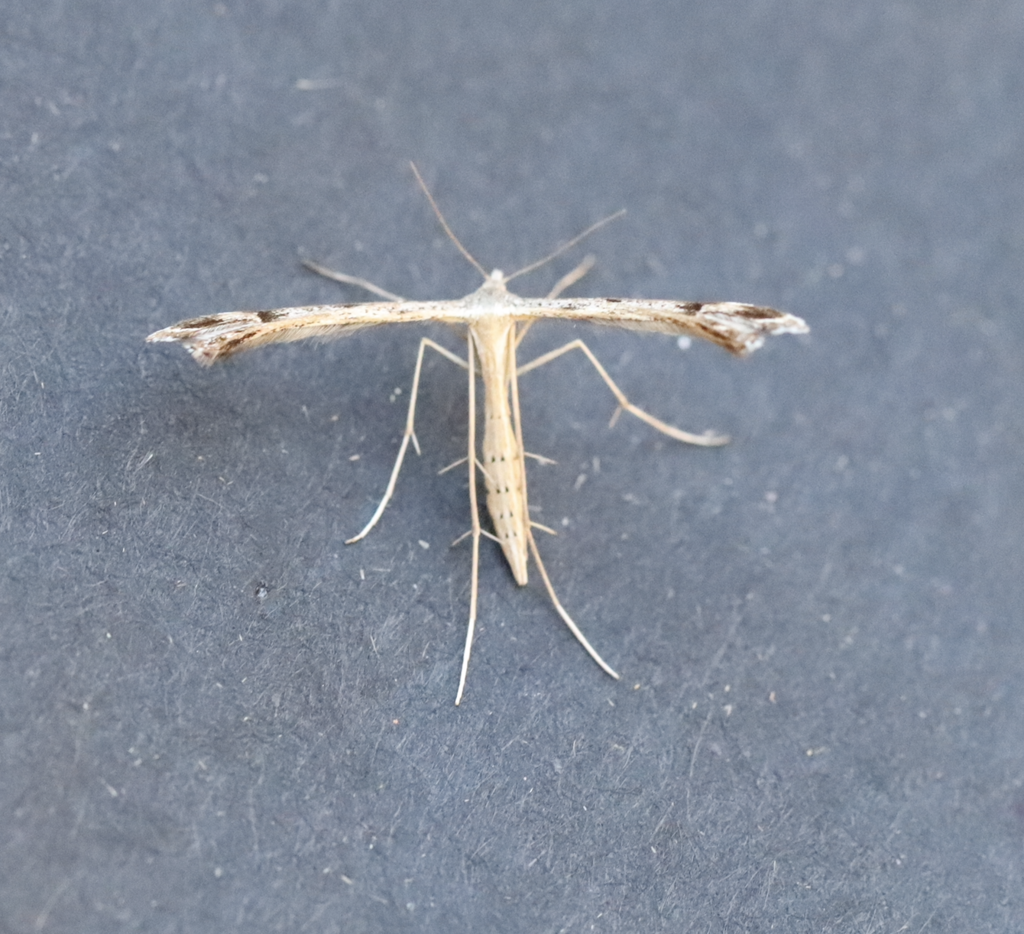

Scientific classification
- Kingdom: Animalia
- Phylum: Arthropoda
- Clade: Pancrustacea
- Class: Insecta
- Order: Lepidoptera
- Family: Pterophoridae
- Genus: Stenoptilia
- Species: S. coloradensis

Binomial name
- Stenoptilia coloradensis Fernald, 1898

= Stenoptilia coloradensis =

Species of plume moth

Stenoptilia coloradensis is a moth of the family Pterophoridae. It is found in North America (including California, Colorado, Ohio, Ontario, the Yukon, British Columbia and Alberta).

The wingspan is 16–24 mm. The head and front half of the thorax are dark ashy grey. The hind part of the thorax is much lighter towards the abdomen, which is ashy grey above and lighter beneath. A fine whitish longitudinal line occurs on each side of the head, over the eyes. The forewings have a dark-brown stripe running along the costa, which widens outwardly to include the whole of the first lobe, which is more or less sprinkled with white scales, especially on the middle of the wing and at the base and near the end of the first lobe, the two latter forming two more or less defined oblique white stripes, the outer one of which is much more oblique and narrower than the one above the end of the fissure. The hind half of the wing is much lighter, with a somewhat indistinct brown spot on the middle of the cell and another just within the end of the cleft. The fringes are brownish, with a sub-basal darker line. The hindwings and fringes greyish brown.

The larvae feed on Gentiana quinquefolia.
