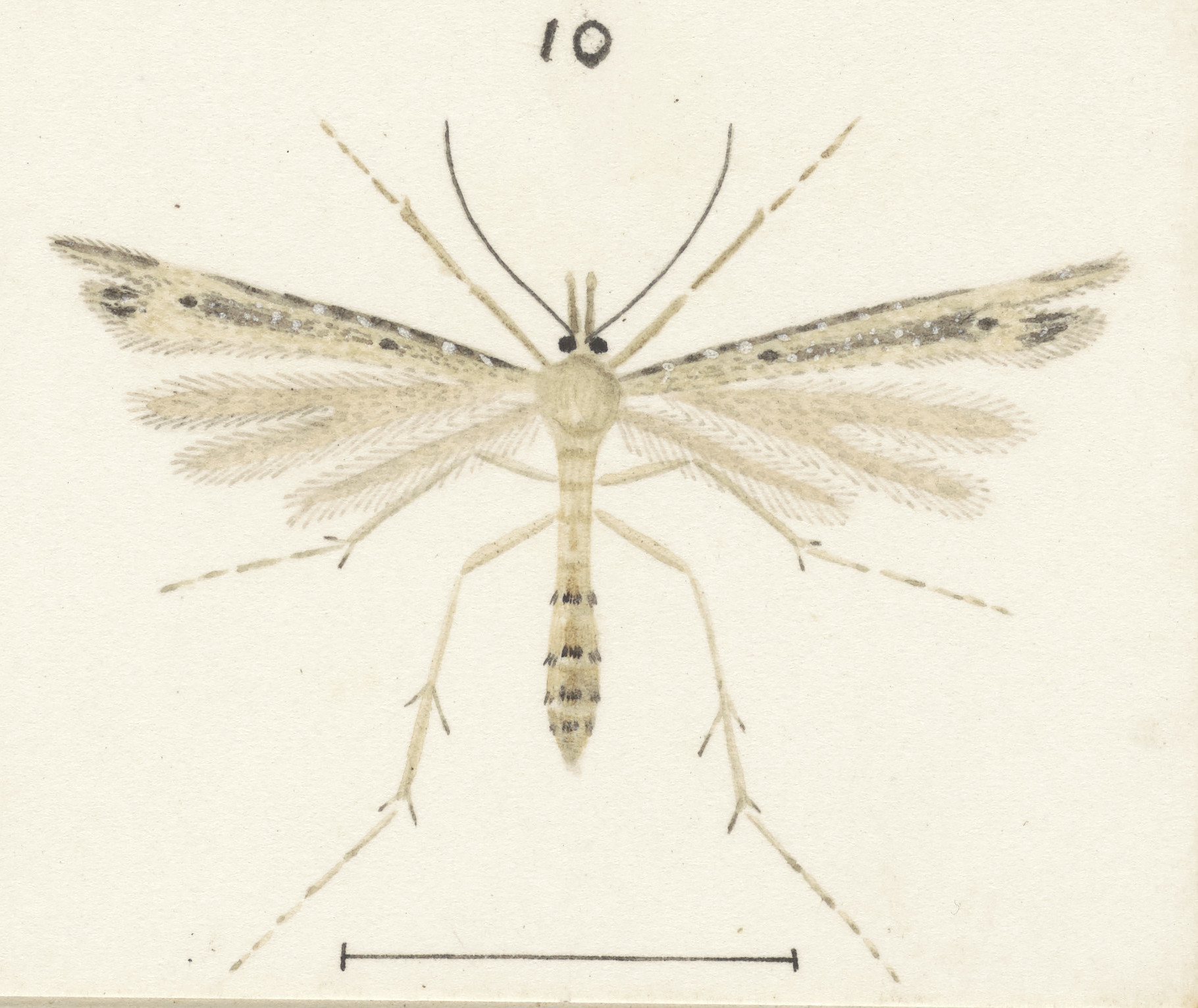

Scientific classification
- Kingdom: Animalia
- Phylum: Arthropoda
- Clade: Pancrustacea
- Class: Insecta
- Order: Lepidoptera
- Family: Pterophoridae
- Genus: Stenoptilia
- Species: S. orites

Binomial name
- Stenoptilia orites (Meyrick, 1884)

Synonyms
- Mimaeseoptilus orites Meyrick, 1884

= Stenoptilia orites =

Species of plume moth

Stenoptilia orites is a moth of the family Pterophoridae. It is found in New Zealand.

The larvae feed on the flowers of Senecio and Brachyglottis species.
