= Stenoptilia karsholti =

Scientific classification
- Kingdom: Animalia
- Phylum: Arthropoda
- Clade: Pancrustacea
- Class: Insecta
- Order: Lepidoptera
- Family: Pterophoridae
- Genus: Stenoptilia
- Species: S. karsholti

Binomial name
- Stenoptilia karsholti Gielis, 1995

Species of plume moth

Stenoptilia karsholti is a moth of the family Pterophoridae.

== Distribution ==
It is known from Peru.

== Description ==
The wingspan is 15–17 millimetres (0.6–0.7 in). Adults are on wing at the end of March and the beginning April.

The host plant is unknown, but adults have been recorded flying around a Gentiana species.
