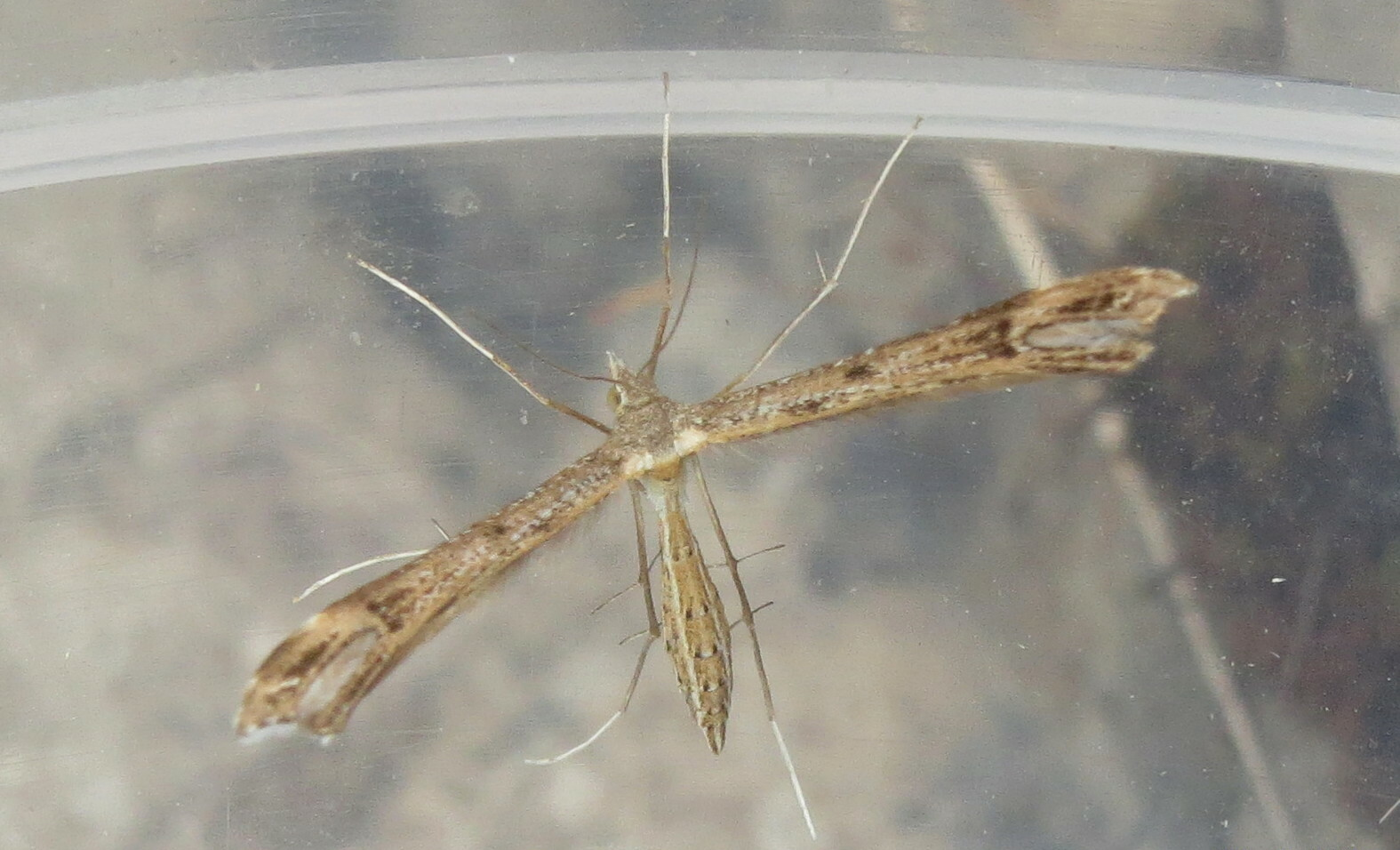

Scientific classification
- Kingdom: Animalia
- Phylum: Arthropoda
- Clade: Pancrustacea
- Class: Insecta
- Order: Lepidoptera
- Family: Pterophoridae
- Genus: Stenoptilia
- Species: S. millieridactyla

Binomial name
- Stenoptilia millieridactyla (Bruand, 1859)

Synonyms
- List: Stenoptilia millieridactylus; Pterophorus millieridactyla Bruand d'Uzelle, 1861; Stenoptilia saxifragae T. B. Fletcher & Pierce, 1940

= Stenoptilia millieridactyla =

Species of plume moth

Stenoptilia millieridactyla, also known as the saxifrage plume, is a moth of the family Pterophoridae first described by Charles Théophile Bruand d'Uzelle in 1859. It is found in Europe.

== Description ==
The wingspan is 17–20 mm. Gielis, C., 1996 provides a description.

Adults are on wing in June and July, with a small second generation in late August and early September in some years.

From late August the larvae feed on Saxifraga ragosoi, meadow saxifrage (Saxifraga granulata) and mossy saxifrage (Saxifraga hypnoides) including cultivars.

== Distribution ==
Stenoptilia millieridactyla is found in France, Great Britain, the Iberian Peninsula, Ireland and Italy. Accidentally introduced to Great Britain in the 1960s and expanding its range. In Derbyshire the larvae have been found feeding on cultivars of mossy saxifrage in gardens.
