= Stenoptilia natalensis =

Scientific classification
- Kingdom: Animalia
- Phylum: Arthropoda
- Clade: Pancrustacea
- Class: Insecta
- Order: Lepidoptera
- Family: Pterophoridae
- Genus: Stenoptilia
- Species: S. natalensis

Binomial name
- Stenoptilia natalensis Ustjuzhanin et Kovtunovich, 2010

Species of plume moth

Stenoptilia natalensis is a moth of the family Pterophoridae, and the genus Stenoptilia. It is known for being from South Africa.
