= Stenoptilia eborinodactyla =

Scientific classification
- Kingdom: Animalia
- Phylum: Arthropoda
- Clade: Pancrustacea
- Class: Insecta
- Order: Lepidoptera
- Family: Pterophoridae
- Genus: Stenoptilia
- Species: S. eborinodactyla

Binomial name
- Stenoptilia eborinodactyla Zagulajev, 1986

Species of plume moth

Stenoptilia eborinodactyla is a moth of the family Pterophoridae. It is found on the chalk steppes of Russia.
