= Procapperia kuldschaensis =

Scientific classification
- Kingdom: Animalia
- Phylum: Arthropoda
- Class: Insecta
- Order: Lepidoptera
- Family: Pterophoridae
- Genus: Procapperia
- Species: P. kuldschaensis

Binomial name
- Procapperia kuldschaensis (Rebel, 1914)

Synonyms
- Oxyptilus kuldschaensis Rebel, 1914; Procapperia asiatica Zagulajev, 1986

Species of plume moth

Procapperia kuldschaensis is a moth of the family Pterophoridae. It is found in Ukraine, Kyrgyzstan, Uzbekistan, Pakistan, China, Mongolia, southern Afghanistan and the Tian Shan area.

The larvae possibly feed on Dracocephalum nutans.
