= Stenoptilia coprodactylus =

Scientific classification
- Kingdom: Animalia
- Phylum: Arthropoda
- Clade: Pancrustacea
- Class: Insecta
- Order: Lepidoptera
- Family: Pterophoridae
- Genus: Stenoptilia
- Species: S. coprodactylus

Binomial name
- Stenoptilia coprodactylus (Stainton, 1851)

Synonyms
- Pterophorus coprodactylus Stainton, 1851; Stenoptilia zalocrossa Meyrick, 1907; Stenoptilia pseudocoprodactyla Gibeaux, 1992

Species of plume moth

Stenoptilia coprodactylus is a moth of the family Pterophoridae. It is found in Spain, France, Italy, Switzerland, Austria, Germany, Poland, the Czech Republic, Slovakia, Hungary, Romania, Bulgaria, Serbia and Montenegro, Bosnia and Herzegovina, Albania and Russia.

The wingspan is 21–24 mm.

The larvae feed on Gentiana verna, Gentiana acaulis and Gentiana lutea.
