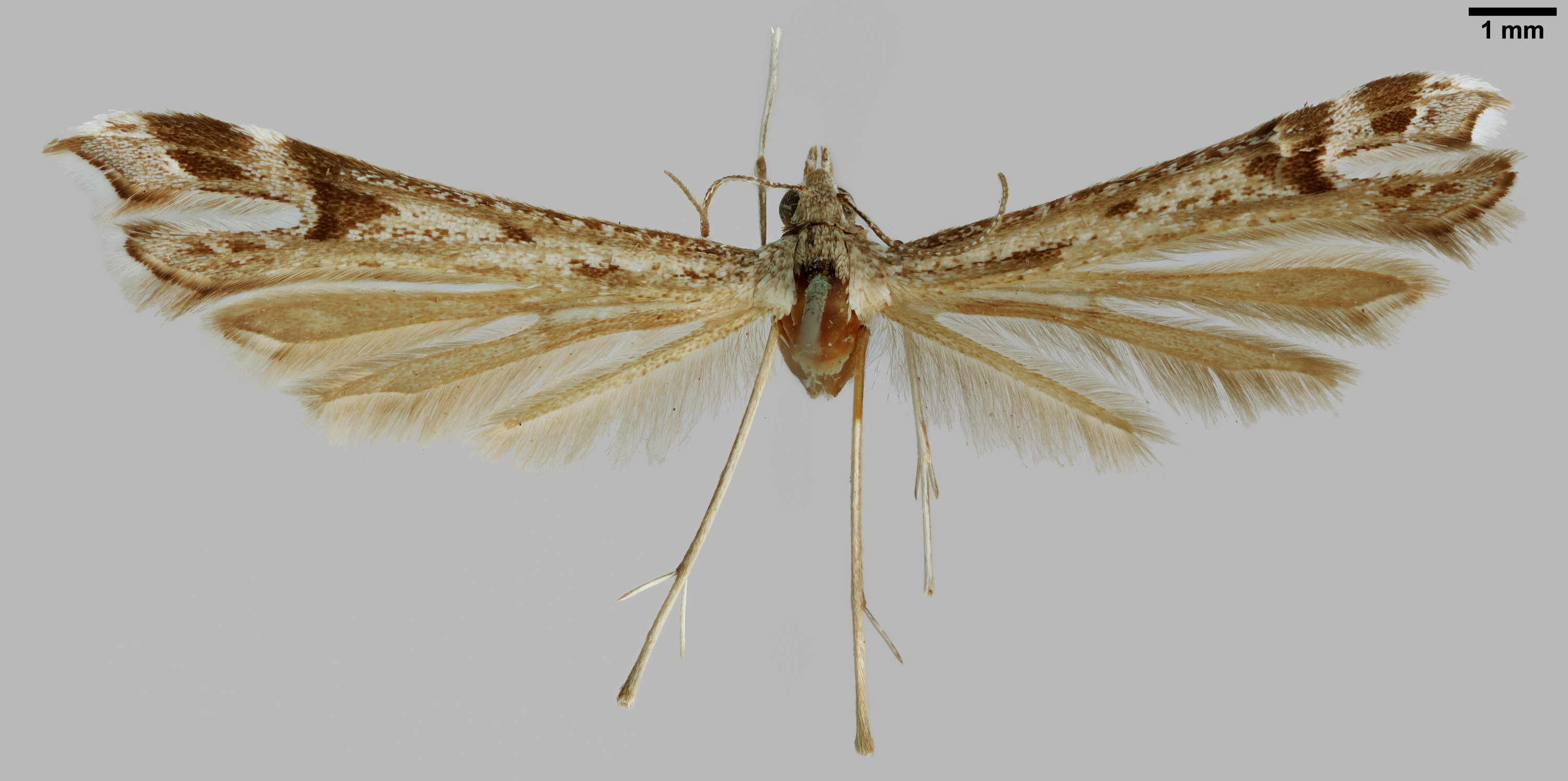

Scientific classification
- Kingdom: Animalia
- Phylum: Arthropoda
- Clade: Pancrustacea
- Class: Insecta
- Order: Lepidoptera
- Family: Pterophoridae
- Genus: Stenoptilia
- Species: S. nolckeni

Binomial name
- Stenoptilia nolckeni (Tengström, 1869)

Synonyms
- Pterophorus nolckeni Tengström, 1869; Pterophorus caesius Snellen, 1884

= Stenoptilia nolckeni =

Species of plume moth

Stenoptilia nolckeni is a moth of the family Pterophoridae. It is found in Kyrgyzstan, Kazakhstan, Finland and northern Russia. It has also been recorded from Korea and China.

The wingspan is about 18 mm.
