= Tabulaephorus decipiens =

Scientific classification
- Kingdom: Animalia
- Phylum: Arthropoda
- Class: Insecta
- Order: Lepidoptera
- Family: Pterophoridae
- Genus: Tabulaephorus
- Species: T. decipiens

Binomial name
- Tabulaephorus decipiens (Lederer, 1870)

Synonyms
- Pterophorus decipiens Lederer, 1870; Pterophorus tristanae Zagulajev, 1986

Species of plume moth

Tabulaephorus decipiens is a moth of the family Pterophoridae. It is found in Russia (the Caucasus region).
