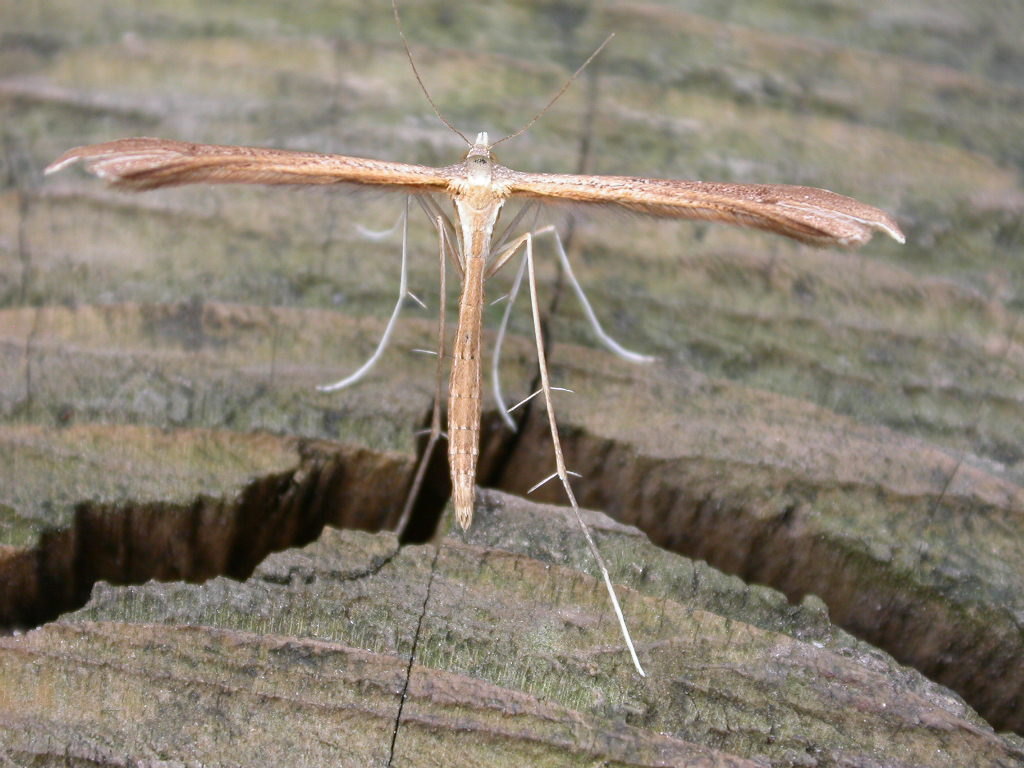

Scientific classification
- Kingdom: Animalia
- Phylum: Arthropoda
- Clade: Pancrustacea
- Class: Insecta
- Order: Lepidoptera
- Family: Pterophoridae
- Genus: Stenoptilia
- Species: S. bipunctidactyla

Binomial name
- Stenoptilia bipunctidactyla (Scopoli, 1763)

Synonyms
- List: Phalaena bipunctidactyla Scopoli, 1763; Alucita mictodactyla Denis & Schiffermüller, 1775; Pterophorus hodgkinsonii Gregson, 1868; Pterophorus hirundodactyla Gregson, 1871; Pterophorus plagiodactylus Stainton, 1851; Pterophorus serotinus Zeller, 1852; Pterophorus scabiodactyla Gregson, 1871; Stenoptilia succisae Gibeaux & Nel, 1991; Stenoptilia tourlani Gibeaux, 1992

= Stenoptilia bipunctidactyla =

Species of plume moth

Stenoptilia bipunctidactyla, also known as the twin-spot plume, is a moth of the Pterophoroidea family found in North Africa, Asia and Europe. It was first described by the Austrian physician and naturalist, Giovanni Antonio Scopoli in 1763. It is one of four similar looking moths.

== Description ==
The wingspan is 17–25 mm. The moths fly from dusk, in two overlapping generations from March to October, depending on location. They are also attracted to light.

Similar species

This moth may be an aggregate of species with similar looking wings and is part of the Stenoptilia bipunctidactyla group of four species which all look similar. The other moths of this group are,

- small scabious plume (Stenoptilia annadactyla)
- scarce plume (Stenoptilia inopinata)
- Gregson's plume (Stenoptilia scabiodactylus)

See Gielis, C., 1996. Pterophoridae

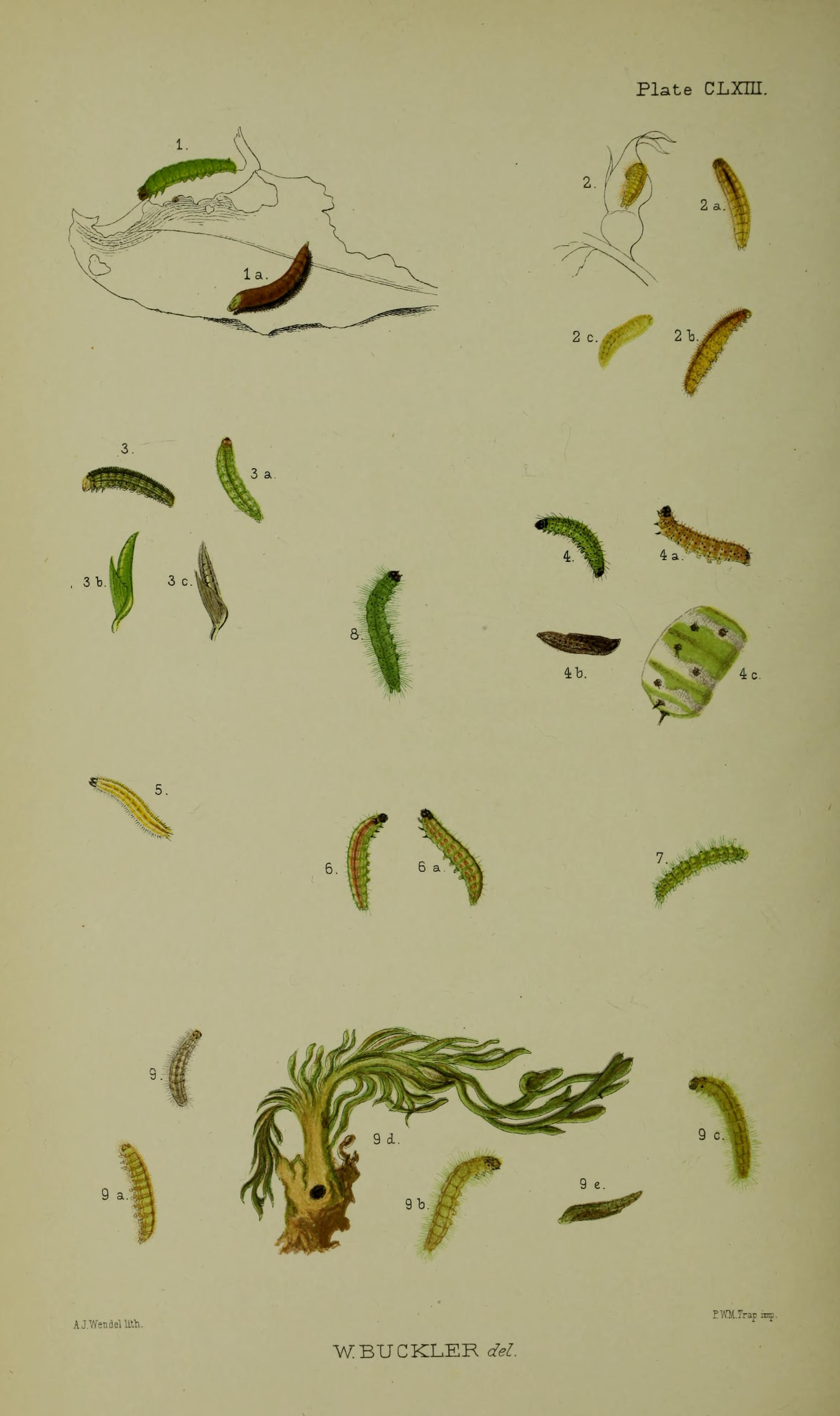
Figs Figs 9, 9a, 9b, 9c larvae in various stages of growth 9d attacked food plant (Scabiosa columbaria)

Early stages

The larvae feed on devil's-bit scabious (Succisa pratensis), common toadflax (Linaria vulgaris), weasel's snout (Misopates orontium), small scabious (Scabiosa columbaria) and widow flower (Knautia species). There are differences in the early and intermediate larval instars which may be two different species or the variation may be due to diet, season or normal variation within the species. Larvae found on one foodplant can be reared on the other foodplant. They overwinter as an early instar. Spring generation larvae feed within a stem and some, later in a folded leaf, while the summer generation feed in the flowers.

Pupae are attached to the larval foodplant or to a nearby stem.

== Distribution ==
The twin-spot plume is found in Europe, Asia Minor, Syria, North Africa and Iran.
