= Stenoptilia pelidnodactyla =

Scientific classification
- Kingdom: Animalia
- Phylum: Arthropoda
- Clade: Pancrustacea
- Class: Insecta
- Order: Lepidoptera
- Family: Pterophoridae
- Genus: Stenoptilia
- Species: S. pelidnodactyla

Binomial name
- Stenoptilia pelidnodactyla (Stein, 1837)

Synonyms
- Alucita pelidnodactyla Stein, 1837; Stenoptila pelidnodactyla ab. alpinalis Burmann, 1954; Stenoptilia bigoti Gibeaux, 1986; Stenoptilia gibeauxi J. Nel, 1989; Stenoptilia cerdanica Nel & Gibeaux, 1990; Stenoptilia cebennica Nel & Gibeaux, 1990; Stenoptilia mercantourica Nel & Gibeaux, 1990; Stenoptilia brigantiensis Nel & Gibeaux, 1992; Stenoptilia buvati Nel & Gibeaux, 1992

Species of plume moth

Stenoptilia pelidnodactyla is a moth of the family Pterophoridae. It is found in most of Europe, except Portugal, Great Britain, Ireland, the Netherlands, Croatia, Greece, Lithuania and Ukraine.

The wingspan is 16–25 mm. Adults are on wing from May to September.

The larvae feed on meadow saxifrage (Saxifraga granulata), mossy saxifrage (Saxifraga bryoides), Saxifraga pedemontana, Saxifraga moschata, Saxifraga nervosa, Saxifraga prostii, Saxifraga exarata, Saxifraga aquatica, Saxifraga geranioides and Plantago sempervirens.
