= Procapperia linariae =

Scientific classification
- Kingdom: Animalia
- Phylum: Arthropoda
- Class: Insecta
- Order: Lepidoptera
- Family: Pterophoridae
- Genus: Procapperia
- Species: P. linariae

Binomial name
- Procapperia linariae (Chretien, 1922)

Synonyms
- Oxyptilia linariae Chrétien, 1922; Procapperia croatica Adamczewski, 1951

Species of plume moth

Procapperia linariae is a moth of the family Pterophoridae. It is found in Morocco, Spain, Asia Minor, the Balkan Peninsula, Ukraine and Kazakhstan.

Adults are on wing from June to July. There are probably two generations per year.

The larvae feed on Scutellaria demnatensis.
