= Scopula amseli =

Scientific classification
- Kingdom: Animalia
- Phylum: Arthropoda
- Class: Insecta
- Order: Lepidoptera
- Family: Geometridae
- Genus: Scopula
- Species: S. amseli

Binomial name
- Scopula amseli Wiltshire, 1967

Species of geometer moth in subfamily Sterrhinae

Scopula amseli is a moth of the family Geometridae. It is endemic to Iran.
