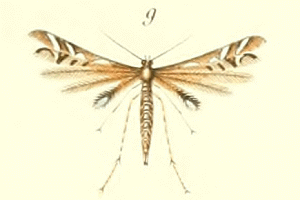

Scientific classification
- Kingdom: Animalia
- Phylum: Arthropoda
- Class: Insecta
- Order: Lepidoptera
- Family: Pterophoridae
- Genus: Procapperia
- Species: P. maculatus

Binomial name
- Procapperia maculatus (Constant, 1865)

Synonyms
- Oxyptilus maculatus Constant, 1865; Procapperia maculata

= Procapperia maculatus =

Species of plume moth

Procapperia maculatus is a moth of the family Pterophoridae. It is found in Asia Minor and the Alps of France and Italy and the Pyrenees. It has also been recorded from Russia and Georgia.

The wingspan is 20–23 mm.

The larvae feed on Scutellaria alpina.
