= Stenoptilia luteocinereus =

Scientific classification
- Kingdom: Animalia
- Phylum: Arthropoda
- Clade: Pancrustacea
- Class: Insecta
- Order: Lepidoptera
- Family: Pterophoridae
- Genus: Stenoptilia
- Species: S. luteocinereus

Binomial name
- Stenoptilia luteocinereus (Snellen, 1884)

Synonyms
- Pterophorus luteocinereus Snellen, 1884; Stenoptilia luteocinerea; Pterophorus luteocinerea

Species of plume moth

Stenoptilia luteocinereus is a moth of the family Pterophoridae. It is found in the Amur region of Russia.
