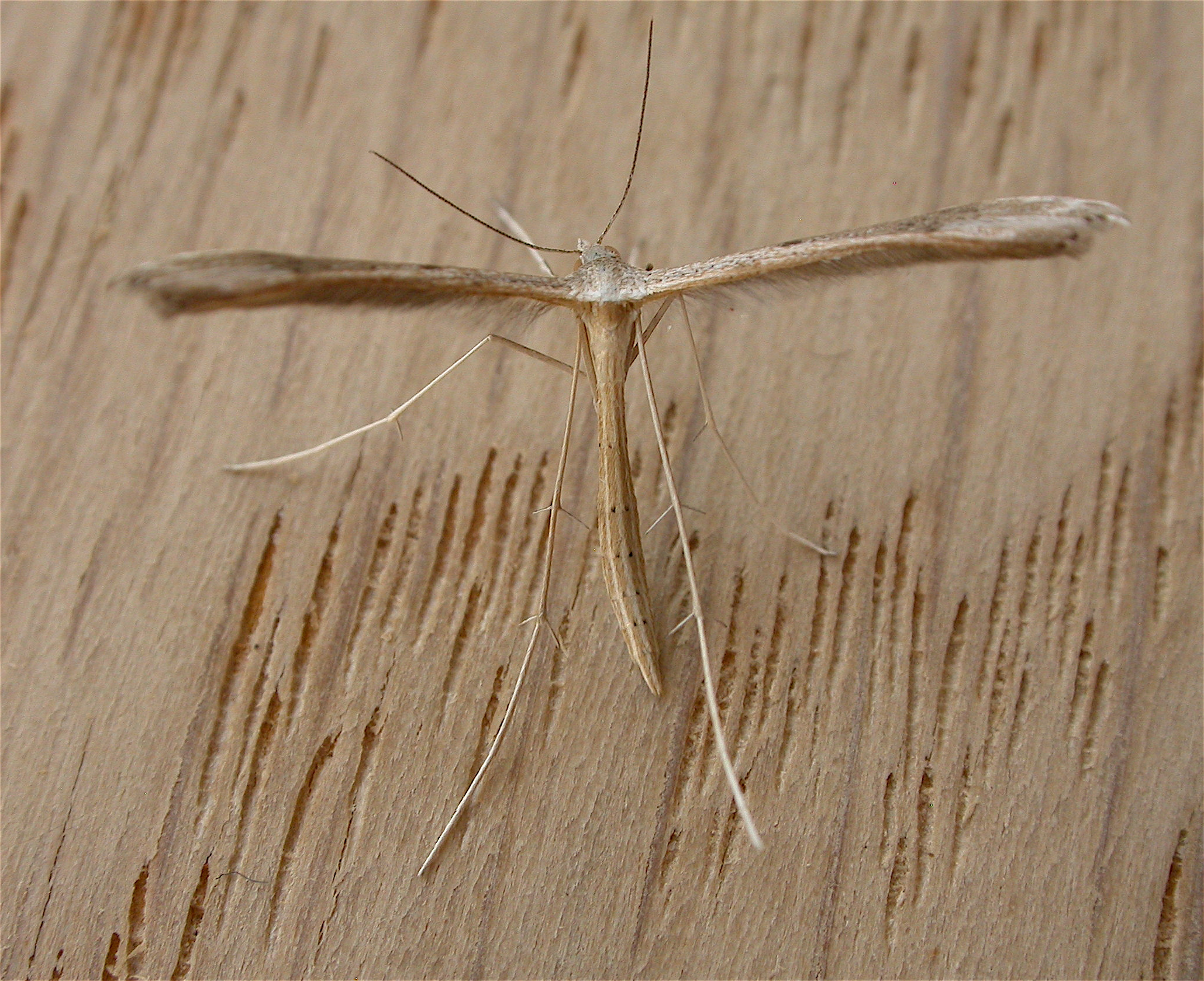

Scientific classification
- Kingdom: Animalia
- Phylum: Arthropoda
- Clade: Pancrustacea
- Class: Insecta
- Order: Lepidoptera
- Family: Pterophoridae
- Genus: Stenoptilia
- Species: S. zophodactylus

Binomial name
- Stenoptilia zophodactylus (Duponchel, 1840)

Synonyms
- Pterophorus loewii Zeller, 1847; Pterophorus zophodactylus Duponchel, 1840; Pterophorus canalis Walker, 1864; Mimeseoptilus semicostata Zeller, 1873

= Stenoptilia zophodactylus =

Species of plume moth

Stenoptilia zophodactylus, also known as the dowdy plume, is a species of moth of the family Pterophoridae found worldwide. It was first described by Philogène Auguste Joseph Duponchel in 1840.

== Description ==
The wingspan is 16–23 mm. Gielis, C., 1996 provides a description.

The moth can be found from July to September in two or more overlapping broods.

Larvae can be found from March to September, initially in an irregular, full depth blotch which may occupy the entire leaf. The frass is in numerous, dispersed brown grains. Some larvae leave the mine during an early instar and feed externally on flower buds and developing fruits while others remain in the mine until shortly before pupation. The larvae feed on common centaury (Centaurium erythraea), Centaurium venusta and Centaurium littoralis, yellow-wort (Blackstonia perfoliata), great yellow gentian (Gentiana lutea), German gentian (Gentianella germanica), Gentianella diemensis, Sopubia trifida and Ngai camphor (Blumea balsamifera).

== Distribution ==
It is found in Europe, North America (including Mexico), South America (Ecuador and Paraguay), Australia, New Zealand, South Africa, India and Iran.
