= Stenoptilia parnasia =

Scientific classification
- Kingdom: Animalia
- Phylum: Arthropoda
- Clade: Pancrustacea
- Class: Insecta
- Order: Lepidoptera
- Family: Pterophoridae
- Genus: Stenoptilia
- Species: S. parnasia

Binomial name
- Stenoptilia parnasia Arenberger, 1986

Species of plume moth

Stenoptilia parnasia is a moth of the family Pterophoridae. It is found in Greece, Turkey, Armenia, Turkmenistan and Iran.
