= Stenoptilia graphodactyla =

Scientific classification
- Kingdom: Animalia
- Phylum: Arthropoda
- Clade: Pancrustacea
- Class: Insecta
- Order: Lepidoptera
- Family: Pterophoridae
- Genus: Stenoptilia
- Species: S. graphodactyla

Binomial name
- Stenoptilia graphodactyla (Treitschke, 1833)

Synonyms
- Alucita graphodactyla Treitschke, 1833

Species of plume moth

Stenoptilia graphodactyla is a moth of the family Pterophoridae. It is found in Spain, Belgium, Germany, Poland, the Czech Republic, Slovakia, Austria, Switzerland, Italy, Romania, Bulgaria, Serbia and Montenegro, North Macedonia, and Albania. It is also known from Russia (the West Siberian plain).

The wingspan is 22–27 mm. Adults are on wing in July.

The larvae feed on Gentiana species, including Gentiana lutea, Gentiana verna, Gentiana clusii, Gentiana asclepiadea, and Gentiana pneumonanthe.
