= Tabulaephorus ussuriensis =

Scientific classification
- Kingdom: Animalia
- Phylum: Arthropoda
- Class: Insecta
- Order: Lepidoptera
- Family: Pterophoridae
- Genus: Tabulaephorus
- Species: T. ussuriensis

Binomial name
- Tabulaephorus ussuriensis (Caradja, 1920)

Synonyms
- Alucita ussuriensis Caradja, 1920; Pterophorus ussuriensis

Species of plume moth

Tabulaephorus ussuriensis is a moth of the family Pterophoridae. It was described by Aristide Caradja in 1920 and is found in Russia.
