= Stenoptilia kurushensis =

Scientific classification
- Kingdom: Animalia
- Phylum: Arthropoda
- Clade: Pancrustacea
- Class: Insecta
- Order: Lepidoptera
- Family: Pterophoridae
- Genus: Stenoptilia
- Species: S. kurushensis

Binomial name
- Stenoptilia kurushensis Kovtunovich, 2001

Species of plume moth

Stenoptilia kurushensis is a moth of the family Pterophoridae. It is found in Daghestan, Russia.
