= Stenoptilia veronicae =

Scientific classification
- Kingdom: Animalia
- Phylum: Arthropoda
- Clade: Pancrustacea
- Class: Insecta
- Order: Lepidoptera
- Family: Pterophoridae
- Genus: Stenoptilia
- Species: S. veronicae

Binomial name
- Stenoptilia veronicae Karvonen, 1932

Synonyms
- Stenoptilia agutsana Ustjuzhanin, 1996

Species of plume moth

Stenoptilia veronicae is a moth of the family Pterophoridae. It is found in Fennoscandia, Poland, Latvia, Estonia and northern Russia.

The wingspan is 23–26 mm. Adults are on wing from June to August.

The larvae feed on Veronica longifolia.
