= Stenoptilia kosterini =

Scientific classification
- Kingdom: Animalia
- Phylum: Arthropoda
- Clade: Pancrustacea
- Class: Insecta
- Order: Lepidoptera
- Family: Pterophoridae
- Genus: Stenoptilia
- Species: S. kosterini

Binomial name
- Stenoptilia kosterini Ustjuzhanin, 2001

Species of plume moth

Stenoptilia kosterini is a moth of the family Pterophoridae. It is found in Kamchatka, Russia.
