= Stenoptilia admiranda =

Scientific classification
- Kingdom: Animalia
- Phylum: Arthropoda
- Clade: Pancrustacea
- Class: Insecta
- Order: Lepidoptera
- Family: Pterophoridae
- Genus: Stenoptilia
- Species: S. admiranda

Binomial name
- Stenoptilia admiranda Yano, 1963

Species of plume moth

Stenoptilia admiranda is a moth of the family Pterophoridae. It is known from Japan (Honshu).

The length of the forewings is 11–12 mm.
