= Stenoptilia amseli =

Scientific classification
- Kingdom: Animalia
- Phylum: Arthropoda
- Clade: Pancrustacea
- Class: Insecta
- Order: Lepidoptera
- Family: Pterophoridae
- Genus: Stenoptilia
- Species: S. amseli

Binomial name
- Stenoptilia amseli Arenberger, 1990

Species of plume moth

Stenoptilia amseli is a moth of the family Pterophoridae. It is known from Saudi Arabia and Yemen.
