= Stenoptilia mannii =

Scientific classification
- Kingdom: Animalia
- Phylum: Arthropoda
- Clade: Pancrustacea
- Class: Insecta
- Order: Lepidoptera
- Family: Pterophoridae
- Genus: Stenoptilia
- Species: S. mannii

Binomial name
- Stenoptilia mannii (Zeller, 1852)

Synonyms
- Pterophorus mannii Zeller, 1852; Stenoptilia megalochra Meyrick, 1927

Species of plume moth

Stenoptilia mannii is a moth of the family Pterophoridae. It is found in Bosnia and Herzegovina, North Macedonia, Bulgaria, Greece, Russia, Ukraine, Armenia, Turkey, Iraq, Iran, Uzbekistan, Kazakhstan and Kyrgyzstan.
