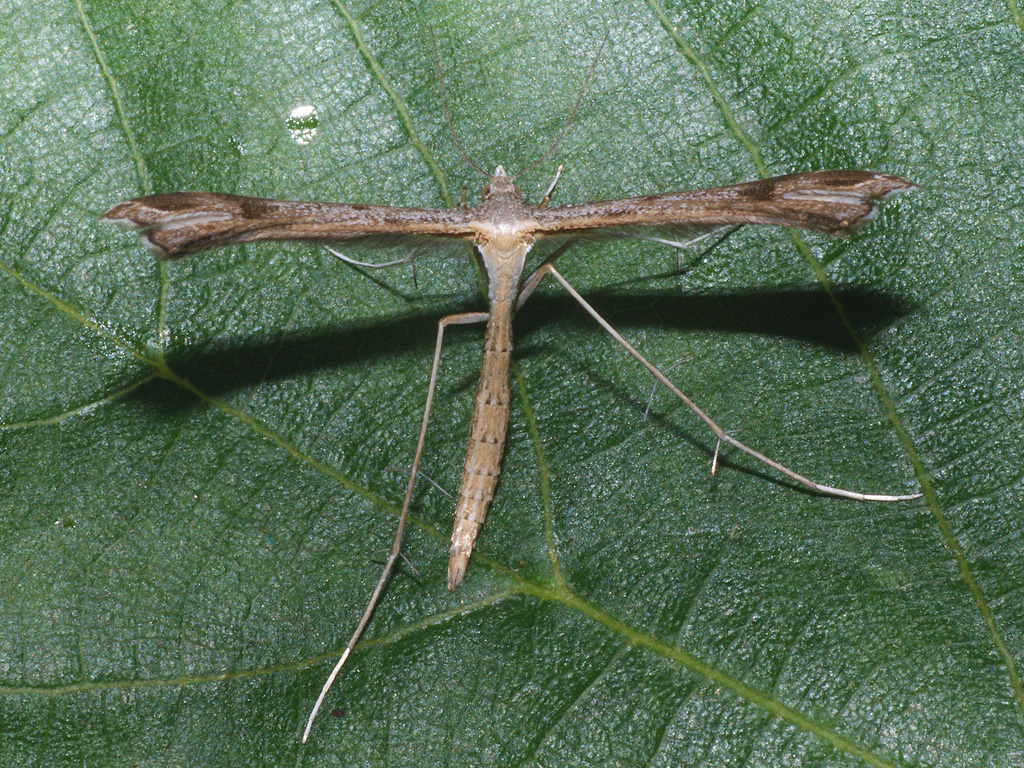

Scientific classification
- Kingdom: Animalia
- Phylum: Arthropoda
- Clade: Pancrustacea
- Class: Insecta
- Order: Lepidoptera
- Family: Pterophoridae
- Genus: Stenoptilia
- Species: S. pneumonanthes

Binomial name
- Stenoptilia pneumonanthes (Büttner, 1880)

Synonyms
- Mimeseoptilus pneumonanthes Buttner, 1880; Stenoptilia arenbergeri Gibeaux, 1990; Stenoptilia nelorum Gibeaux, 1989

= Stenoptilia pneumonanthes =

Species of plume moth

Stenoptilia pneumonanthes, also known as the gentian plume, is a moth of the family Pterophoridae found in central Europe and Russia (the Caucasus). It was first described by Friedrich Otto Büttner in 1880.

Its wingspan is 17–22 mm. Adults are on wing from May to September.
