= Stenoptilia poculi =

Scientific classification
- Kingdom: Animalia
- Phylum: Arthropoda
- Clade: Pancrustacea
- Class: Insecta
- Order: Lepidoptera
- Family: Pterophoridae
- Genus: Stenoptilia
- Species: S. poculi

Binomial name
- Stenoptilia poculi Arenberger, 1998

Species of plume moth

Stenoptilia poculi is a moth of the family Pterophoridae. It is found in Russia (the Caucasus region) and China.

The wingspan is 21–23 mm. Adults have been recorded in July.
