= Stenoptilia convexa =

Scientific classification
- Kingdom: Animalia
- Phylum: Arthropoda
- Clade: Pancrustacea
- Class: Insecta
- Order: Lepidoptera
- Family: Pterophoridae
- Genus: Stenoptilia
- Species: S. convexa

Binomial name
- Stenoptilia convexa Arenberger, 1998

Species of plume moth

Stenoptilia convexa is a moth of the family Pterophoridae. It is found in Russia's Caucasus region.

The wingspan is 20–22 mm. The forewings are coffee brown, nearly without markings. Adults have been recorded in July.
