= Stenoptilia stigmatoides =

Scientific classification
- Kingdom: Animalia
- Phylum: Arthropoda
- Clade: Pancrustacea
- Class: Insecta
- Order: Lepidoptera
- Family: Pterophoridae
- Genus: Stenoptilia
- Species: S. stigmatoides

Binomial name
- Stenoptilia stigmatoides Sutter & Skyva, 1992

Species of plume moth

Stenoptilia stigmatoides is a moth of the family Pterophoridae. It is found in Slovakia and Hungary.
