= Stenoptilia jacutica =

Scientific classification
- Kingdom: Animalia
- Phylum: Arthropoda
- Clade: Pancrustacea
- Class: Insecta
- Order: Lepidoptera
- Family: Pterophoridae
- Genus: Stenoptilia
- Species: S. jacutica

Binomial name
- Stenoptilia jacutica Ustjuzhanin, 1996

Species of plume moth

Stenoptilia jacutica is a moth of the family Pterophoridae. It is found in Yakutia, Russia.
