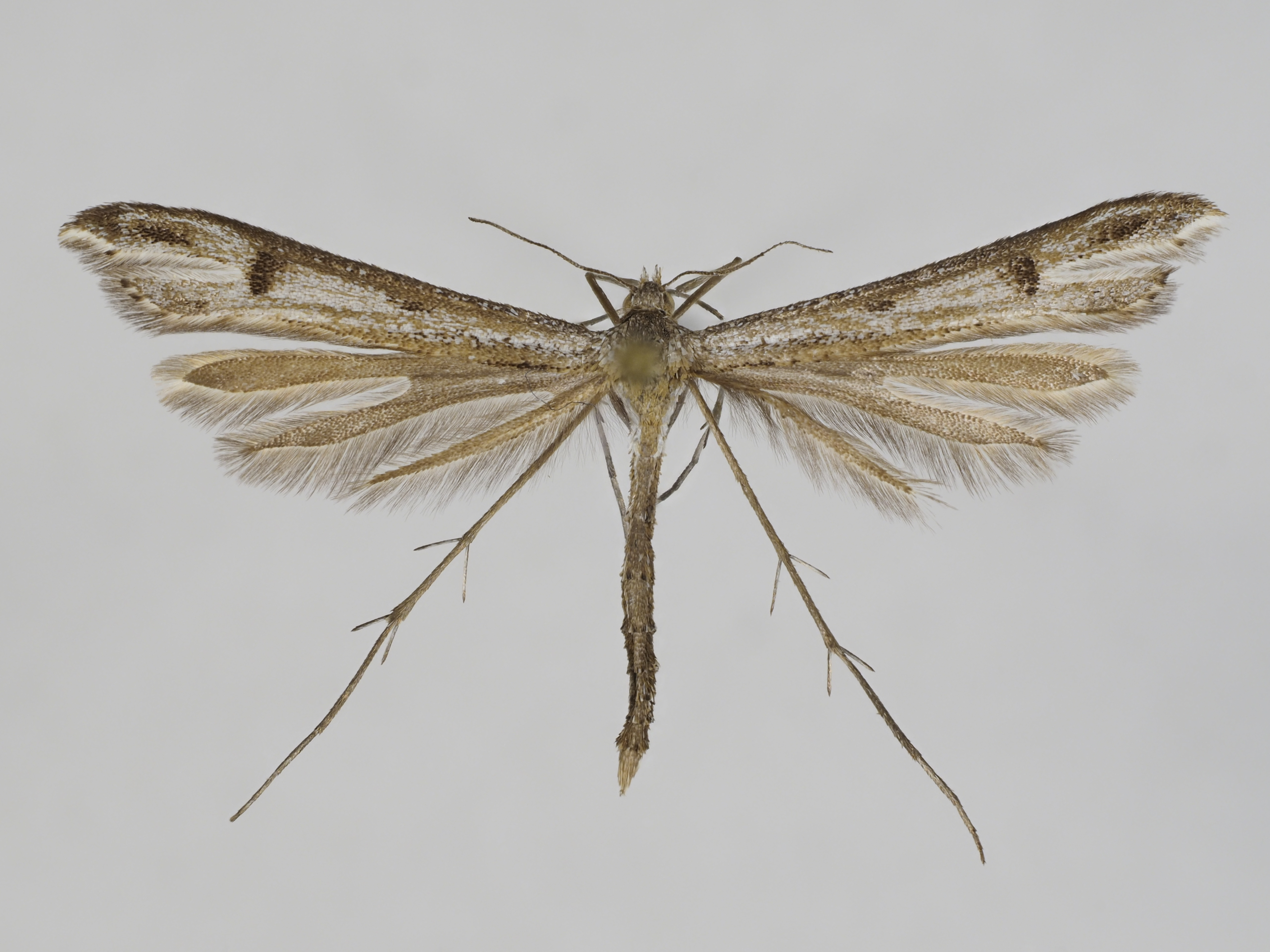

Scientific classification
- Kingdom: Animalia
- Phylum: Arthropoda
- Clade: Pancrustacea
- Class: Insecta
- Order: Lepidoptera
- Family: Pterophoridae
- Genus: Stenoptilia
- Species: S. islandicus

Binomial name
- Stenoptilia islandicus (Staudinger, 1857)

Synonyms
- Pterophorus islandicus Staudinger, 1857; Pterophorus pelidnodactylus var. borealis Wocke, 1864

= Stenoptilia islandicus =

Species of plume moth

Stenoptilia islandicus, also known as the mountain plume, is a moth of the family Pterophoridae found in Europe. It was first described by Otto Staudinger in 1857.

== Description ==
The wingspan is 17–19 mm. Adults are on wing in June and July.

The larvae feed on the flowers and seeds of saxifrages (Saxifraga species), including purple saxifrage (Saxifraga oppositifolia) and yellow saxifrage (Saxifraga aizoides).

== Distribution ==
It is known from Finland, Iceland, Norway, Scotland (from one mountain), Sweden and northern Russia.
