= Stenoptilia latistriga =

Scientific classification
- Kingdom: Animalia
- Phylum: Arthropoda
- Clade: Pancrustacea
- Class: Insecta
- Order: Lepidoptera
- Family: Pterophoridae
- Genus: Stenoptilia
- Species: S. latistriga

Binomial name
- Stenoptilia latistriga Rebel, 1916

Species of plume moth

Stenoptilia latistriga is a moth of the family Pterophoridae. It is found in the South Siberian Mountains of Russia.
