= Stenoptilia aridus =

Scientific classification
- Kingdom: Animalia
- Phylum: Arthropoda
- Clade: Pancrustacea
- Class: Insecta
- Order: Lepidoptera
- Family: Pterophoridae
- Genus: Stenoptilia
- Species: S. aridus

Binomial name
- Stenoptilia aridus (Zeller, 1847)

Synonyms
- List: Mimaeseoptilus aridus Zeller, 1847; Stenoptilia oxyactis Meyrick, 1922; Stenoptilia stigmatodactyla var. grisescens Schawerda, 1933; Stenoptilia csanadyi Gozmány, 1959; Stenoptilia gallobritannidactylus Gibeaux, 1985; Stenoptilia picardi Gibeaux, 1986; Stenoptilia mariaeluisiae Bigot & Picard, 2001; Stenoptilia inopinata Bigot & Picard, 2001; Stenoptilia kopetdagi Zagulajev, 2002

Species of plume moth

Stenoptilia aridus is a moth of the family Pterophoridae. It is found in the Mediterranean region and northern Africa and is a rare immigrant in more northern parts of Europe, including Belgium and Great Britain. It is also known from Central Asia, Yemen and Iran.

The wingspan is 18–19 mm. Adults are on wing from August to October in France.

The larvae feed on Misopates orontium and Kickxia spuria.
