= Stenoptilia annadactyla =

Scientific classification
- Kingdom: Animalia
- Phylum: Arthropoda
- Clade: Pancrustacea
- Class: Insecta
- Order: Lepidoptera
- Family: Pterophoridae
- Genus: Stenoptilia
- Species: S. annadactyla

Binomial name
- Stenoptilia annadactyla Sutter, 1988

Synonyms
- Stenoptilia annickana Gibeaux, 1989

Species of plume moth

Stenoptilia annadactyla, also known as the small scabious plume, is a moth of the family Pterophoridae. It was first described by Reinhard Sutter in 1988 and is found in Europe.

== Description ==
The wingspan is 17–24 mm. Adults are on wing from June to September in at least two generations. They look similar to the three other species of moths in the Stenoptilia bipunctidactyla group and can only be told apart from detailed examination, including the genitalia.

Early instar larvae mine the central rosette of small scabious (Scabiosa columbaria) leaves; the central two or three leaves wilt, turn greyish and a larva can be found by gently pulling the leaves apart. The final instar feeds externally.

== Distribution ==
The moth has so far been found in Austria, Czech Republic, England, Estonia, France, Germany, Hungary, Italy, Slovakia and Switzerland. It was first recorded from Great Britain in 2005 when larvae were reared from the flowers of small scabious found in Breckland, East Anglia. Earlier specimens found in Norfolk are also of this species. It has also been found at Settle, Yorkshire.
