= Hellinsia wrangeliensis =

Scientific classification
- Domain: Eukaryota
- Kingdom: Animalia
- Phylum: Arthropoda
- Class: Insecta
- Order: Lepidoptera
- Family: Pterophoridae
- Genus: Hellinsia
- Species: H. wrangeliensis

Binomial name
- Hellinsia wrangeliensis (Zagulajev, 1985)

Synonyms
- Leioptilus wrangeliensis Zagulajev, 1985

Species of moth

Hellinsia wrangeliensis is a moth of the family Pterophoridae. It is found in Russia (where it was described from Wrangel Island).
