= Tabulaephorus marptys =

Scientific classification
- Kingdom: Animalia
- Phylum: Arthropoda
- Class: Insecta
- Order: Lepidoptera
- Family: Pterophoridae
- Genus: Tabulaephorus
- Species: T. marptys

Binomial name
- Tabulaephorus marptys (Christoph, 1872)

Synonyms
- Alucita marptys Christoph, 1872; Porrittia marptys; Aciptilia kaszaki Bigot, 1967

Species of plume moth

Tabulaephorus marptys is a moth of the family Pterophoridae. It is found in Russia, Kazakhstan and Mongolia.

Adults are on wing from May to September.
