= Stenoptilia pinarodactyla =

Scientific classification
- Kingdom: Animalia
- Phylum: Arthropoda
- Clade: Pancrustacea
- Class: Insecta
- Order: Lepidoptera
- Family: Pterophoridae
- Genus: Stenoptilia
- Species: S. pinarodactyla

Binomial name
- Stenoptilia pinarodactyla (Erschoff, 1877)

Synonyms
- Mimaeseoptilus pinarodactylus Erschoff, 1877; Stenoptilia pinarodactylus

Species of plume moth

Stenoptilia pinarodactyla is a moth of the family Pterophoridae. It is known from Japan (Hokkaido) and Siberia.
