= Epermenia sergei =

Scientific classification
- Kingdom: Animalia
- Phylum: Arthropoda
- Clade: Pancrustacea
- Class: Insecta
- Order: Lepidoptera
- Family: Epermeniidae
- Genus: Epermenia
- Species: E. sergei

Binomial name
- Epermenia sergei Budashkin, 1996

Synonyms
- Epermenia (Cataplectica) sergei; Epermenia sergeyi Budashkin, 1997

Species of moth

Epermenia sergei is a moth of the family Epermeniidae. It is found in the Russian Far East (Priamur’je and Primor’je).
