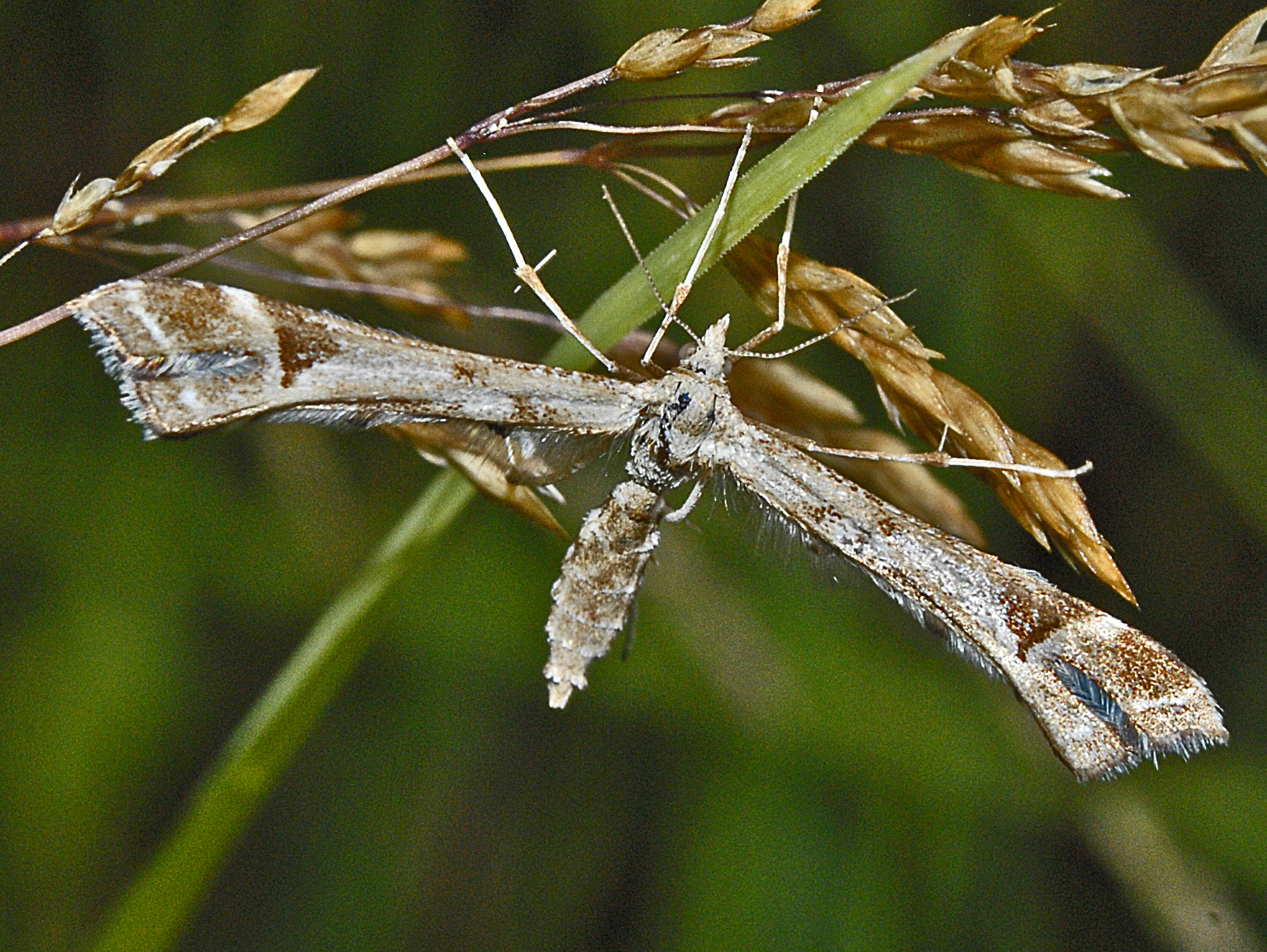
- Platyptilia gonodactyla

Scientific classification
- Domain: Eukaryota
- Kingdom: Animalia
- Phylum: Arthropoda
- Class: Insecta
- Order: Lepidoptera
- Family: Pterophoridae
- Tribe: Platyptiliini
- Genus: Platyptilia; Hübner, [1825]

Synonyms
- Platyptilus Zeller, 1841; Fredericina Tutt, 1905

= Platyptilia =

Plume moth genus

Platyptilia is a genus of moths in the family Pterophoridae. The genus was described by Jacob Hübner in 1825.

== Species ==
- Platyptilia aarviki Gielis, 2008
- Platyptilia ainonis Matsumura, 1931
- Platyptilia albicans (Fish, 1881)
- Platyptilia albifimbriata Arenberger, 2002
- Platyptilia anniei Gielis, 1997
- Platyptilia archimedon Meyrick, 1938
- Platyptilia ardua McDunnough, 1927
- Platyptilia barbarae Ustjuzhanin & Kovtunovich, 2010
- Platyptilia benitensis Strand, 1913
- Platyptilia bowkeri Kovtunovich & Ustjuzhanin, 2011
- Platyptilia cacaliae
- Platyptilia calamicola
- Platyptilia calodactyla (Denis & Schiffermüller, 1775)
- Platyptilia campsiptera Meyrick, 1907
- Platyptilia carduidactyla (Riley, 1869)
- Platyptilia celidotus (Meyrick, 1885)
- Platyptilia censoria Meyrick, 1910
- Platyptilia charadrias (Meyrick, 1884)
- Platyptilia chondrodactyla
- Platyptilia chosokeiella
- Platyptilia citropleura Meyrick, 1907
- Platyptilia comorensis Gibeaux, 1994
- Platyptilia comstocki Lange, 1939
- Platyptilia cretalis Meyrick, 1908
- Platyptilia daemonica Meyrick, 1932
- Platyptilia davisi Gielis, 1991
- Platyptilia dschambiya Arenberger, 1999
- Platyptilia duneraensis Rose and Pooni, 2003
- Platyptilia eberti Gielis, 2003
- Platyptilia enargota Durrant, 1915
- Platyptilia euridactyla
- Platyptilia exaltatus
- Platyptilia farfarellus Zeller, 1867
- Platyptilia fulva Bigot, 1964
- Platyptilia gandaki Gielis, 1999
- Platyptilia gentiliae Gielis, 1991
- Platyptilia gondarensis Gibeaux, 1994
- Platyptilia gonodactyla (Denis & Schiffermüller, 1775)
- Platyptilia gravior Meyrick, 1932
- Platyptilia grisea Gibeaux, 1994
- Platyptilia hokowhitalis Hudson, 1939
- Platyptilia humida Meyrick, 1920
- Platyptilia iberica Rebel, 1935
- Platyptilia ignifera Meyrick, 1908
- Platyptilia implacata Meyrick, 1932
- Platyptilia interpres Meyrick, 1922
- Platyptilia isocrates
- Platyptilia isodactylus (Zeller, 1852)
- Platyptilia isoterma Meyrick, 1909
- Platyptilia johnstoni Lange, 1940
- Platyptilia kozanica Fazekas, 2003
- Platyptilia locharcha Meyrick, 1924
- Platyptilia longalis (Walker, 1864)
- Platyptilia longiloba
- Platyptilia lusi
- Platyptilia melitroctis Meyrick, 1924
- Platyptilia microbscura Gielis & De Vos, 2007
- Platyptilia molopias Meyrick, 1906
- Platyptilia montana Yano, 1963
- Platyptilia morophaea Meyrick, 1920
- Platyptilia naminga
- Platyptilia nemoralis Zeller, 1841
- Platyptilia nussi Gielis, 2003
- Platyptilia odiosa Meyrick, 1924
- Platyptilia omissalis T. B. Fletcher, 1926
- Platyptilia onias Meyrick, 1916
- Platyptilia pauliani Gibeaux, 1994
- Platyptilia percnodactylus (Walsingham, 1880)
- Platyptilia phanerozona Diakonoff, 1952
- Platyptilia peyrierasi Gibeaux, 1994
- Platyptilia picta Meyrick, 1913
- Platyptilia postbarbata Meyrick, 1938
- Platyptilia profunda Yano, 1963
- Platyptilia pseudofulva Gibeaux, 1994
- Platyptilia pulverulenta Philpott, 1923
- Platyptilia pygmaeana Strand, 1913
- Platyptilia resoluta Meyrick, 1937
- Platyptilia rhyncholoba Meyrick, 1924
- Platyptilia romieuxi Gielis, 2009
- Platyptilia rubriacuta Gielis, 2009
- Platyptilia sabius (Felder & Rogenhofer, 1875)
- Platyptilia sciophaea Meyrick, 1920
- Platyptilia sedata Meyrick, 1932
- Platyptilia semnopis Meyrick, 1931
- Platyptilia sochivkoi Kovtunovich & Ustjuzhanin, 2011
- Platyptilia sogai Gibeaux, 1994
- Platyptilia spicula Gielis, 2006
- Platyptilia strictiformis Meyrick, 1932
- Platyptilia suigensis
- Platyptilia superscandens
- Platyptilia tesseradactyla (Linnaeus, 1761)
- Platyptilia thiosoma Meyrick, 1920
- Platyptilia thyellopa Meyrick, 1926
- Platyptilia toxochorda Meyrick, 1934
- Platyptilia triphracta
- Platyptilia ussuriensis
- Platyptilia vilema B. Landry, 1993
- Platyptilia vinsoni Gibeaux, 1994
- Platyptilia violacea Gibeaux, 1994
- Platyptilia washburnensis McDunnough, 1929
- Platyptilia williamsii Grinnell, 1908

Species brought into synonymy

- Platyptilia amphiloga Meyrick, 1909: synonym of Lantanophaga pusillidactyla (Walker, 1864)
- Platyptilia claripicta T. B. Fletcher, 1910: synonym of Platyptilia farfarellus Zeller, 1867
- Platyptilia corniculata: synonym of Marasmarcha corniculata (Meyrick, 1913)
- Platyptilia dimorpha: synonym of Bipunctiphorus dimorpha (T. B. Fletcher, 1910)
- Platyptilia emissalis: synonym of Sinpunctiptilia emissalis (Walker, 1864)
- Platyptilia empedota: synonym of Marasmarcha empedota (Meyrick, 1908)
- Platyptilia euctimena: synonym of Bipunctiphorus euctimena (Turner, 1913)
- Platyptilia infesta: synonym of Inferuncus infesta (Meyrick, 1934)
- Platyptilia maligna Meyrick, 1913: synonym of Vietteilus vigens (Felder & Rogenhofer, 1875)
- Platyptilia patriarcha Meyrick, 1912: synonym of Bipunctiphorus dimorpha (T. B. Fletcher, 1910)
- Platyptilia periacta Meyrick, 1910: synonym of Platyptilia farfarellus Zeller, 1867
- Platyptilia stenoptiloides: synonym of Gillmeria stenoptiloides (Filipjev, 1927)
