= Platyptilia hokowhitalis =

Scientific classification
- Kingdom: Animalia
- Phylum: Arthropoda
- Clade: Pancrustacea
- Class: Insecta
- Order: Lepidoptera
- Family: Pterophoridae
- Genus: Platyptilia
- Species: P. hokowhitalis

Binomial name
- Platyptilia hokowhitalis Hudson, 1939

Species of plume moth

Platyptilia hokowhitalis is a species of moth in the family Pterophoridae. This species is regarded as being taxonomically unresolved. It is endemic to New Zealand and has been observed in the North Island. It inhabits native forest. Adults are on the wing in November and larvae have been reared on shrubby Euphrasia. In 2025 this species was classified as "data deficient" under the New Zealand Threat Classification System.

== Taxonomy ==
This species was originally described and illustrated by George Hudson in 1939. He used a specimen collected on 10 November 1889 in Hokowhitu Bush in Palmerston North. Hudson had previously discussed the species in 1928 mistakenly under the name Platyptilia celidota. The holotype specimen is held at the Museum of New Zealand, Te Papa Tongarewa. As at 2025 this species is regarded as taxonomically unresolved.

== Description ==
Hudson described the species as follows:

The expansion of the wings is 3/4 inch (19 mm.). The fore-wings are pale brownish-ochreous; a series of rather faint darker marks on costa from base to near origin of cleft; a conspicuous black mark at base of cleft, almost at right angles with costa, its upper extremity being very slightly nearer base of wing than lower extremity; cilia brownish-ochreous with slight blackish scale tufts on inner sides of cleft near termen, and strong tufts on dorsum. Hind-wings and cilia paler and slightly greyer than fore-wings; the blackish scale tufts on dorsum of third plume quite evident.

== Distribution ==
This species is endemic to New Zealand. The range of this species includes the Wellington, Whanganui and Taranaki areas. It has been found at Meremere Bush.

== Habitat ==
The holotype of this species was captured in forest habitat. This type locality is now a suburb of Palmerston North.

== Host species ==
Larvae of this species have been reared from a shrubby Euphrasia.

== Conservation status ==
In 2025 this species was classified by the New Zealand Department of Conservation as "data deficient" under the New Zealand Threat Classification System.
