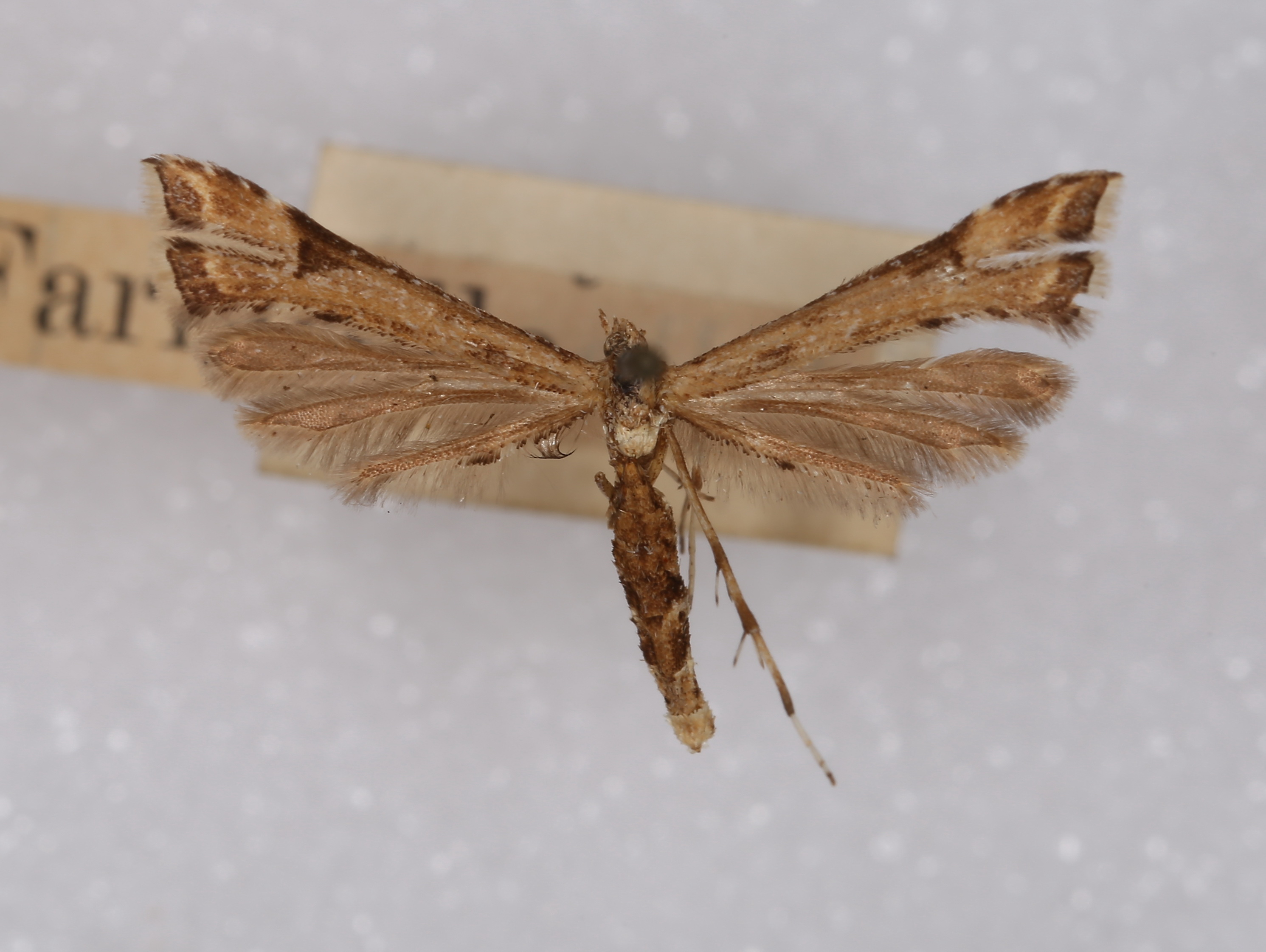

Scientific classification
- Kingdom: Animalia
- Phylum: Arthropoda
- Clade: Pancrustacea
- Class: Insecta
- Order: Lepidoptera
- Family: Pterophoridae
- Genus: Platyptilia
- Species: P. farfarellus

Binomial name
- Platyptilia farfarellus Zeller, 1867

Synonyms
- Platyptilia farfarella; Platyptilia molopias; Platyptilia periacta Meyrick, 1910; Platyptilia claripicta T. B. Fletcher, 1910

= Platyptilia farfarellus =

Species of plume moth

Platyptilia farfarellus is a moth of the family Pterophoridae. The species was described by Philipp Christoph Zeller in 1867. It is found from central and southern Europe to Asia Minor, Micronesia and Japan (the islands of Hokkaido, Honshu, Shikoku and Kyushu). It is also known from Africa, where it has been recorded from Equatorial Guinea, Kenya, Madagascar, Mauritius, Nigeria, South Africa, São Tomé & Principe, Tanzania, Uganda, the Seychelles and Malawi.

The length of the forewings is 7–11 mm.

The larvae feed on Calendula arvensis, Calendula officinalis, Callistephus chinensis, Centaurea cyanus, Dahlia pinnata, Emilia flammea, Erigeron canadensis, Erigeron linifolius, Helichrysum bracteatum and Senecio cruentus.

== Taxonomy ==
Some authors consider Platyptilia molopias to be a synonym of Platyptilia farfarellus.
