= Platyptilia ardua =

Scientific classification
- Kingdom: Animalia
- Phylum: Arthropoda
- Clade: Pancrustacea
- Class: Insecta
- Order: Lepidoptera
- Family: Pterophoridae
- Genus: Platyptilia
- Species: P. ardua

Binomial name
- Platyptilia ardua McDunnough, 1927

Species of plume moth

Platyptilia ardua is a moth of the family Pterophoridae. It is found in North America, including Washington and British Columbia.
