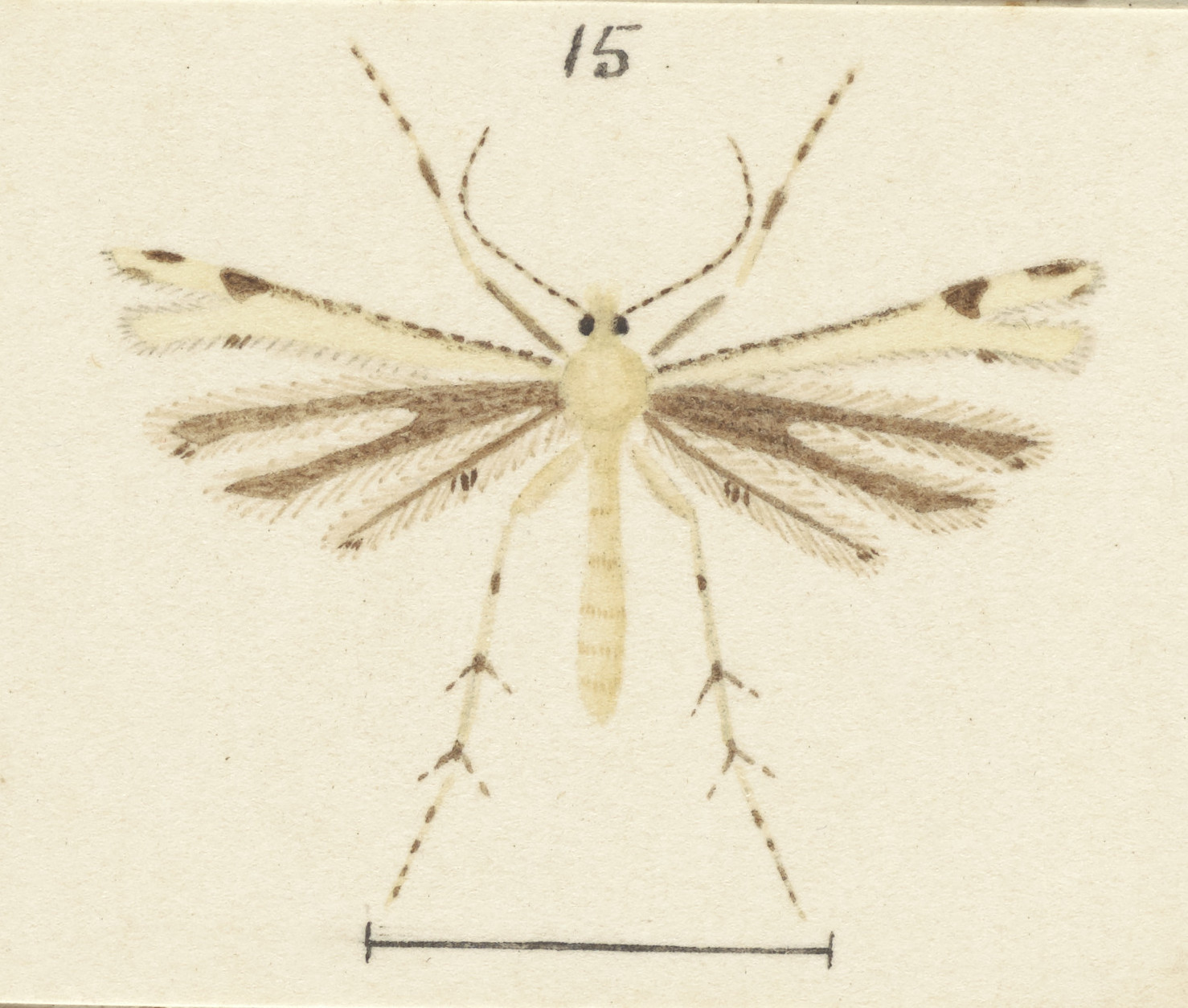
- Illustration of female

Conservation status
- Nationally Vulnerable (NZ TCS)

Scientific classification
- Domain: Eukaryota
- Kingdom: Animalia
- Phylum: Arthropoda
- Class: Insecta
- Order: Lepidoptera
- Family: Pterophoridae
- Genus: Platyptilia
- Species: P. campsiptera

Binomial name
- Platyptilia campsiptera Meyrick, 1907

= Platyptilia campsiptera =

Species of plume moth

Platyptilia campsiptera is a species of moth in the family Pterophoridae. This species is endemic to New Zealand. This species has been classified as Nationally Vulnerable by the Department of Conservation.

== Taxonomy ==
P. campsiptera was first described by Edward Meyrick in 1907 from a specimen collected by George Vernon Hudson in the Humboldt Range at approximately 1100m. In 1928 Hudson also described and illustrated the species. The male holotype is held at the Natural History Museum, London.

== Description ==
Meyrick described the species as follows:

♂︎ 17 mm. Head and thorax yellowish- white, metapleura with an oblique black streak, frontal cone of scales moderately long. Palpi 3 1/2, white, apical 2/3 externally irrorated with dark fuscous. Abdomen pale whitish-yellow, with a black lateral dot near base, and a few black lateral scales posteriorly. Legs white, banded with dark fuscous. Forewings cleft from 3/4, upper segment rather narrow, apex produced, pointed, lower segment much broader, posteriorly dilated; whitish, tinged with pale yellow; costa towards base shortly strigulated with fuscous irroration; a small triangular fuscous spot irrorated with dark fuscous on costa before fissure, not reaching across first segment, and a smaller similar mark on costa between this and apex : cilia ochreous-whitish, spotted with fuscous round lower angle of first segment, and upper angle and termen of second, with a small black scale-tooth on dorsum at 2/3. Hindwings reddish-fuscous; cilia whitish, slightly reddish-tinged, with a blackish basal mark on lower half of termen of first segment, and mere traces of black scales in middle of dorsum of third segment.

Hudson noted that when resting P. campsiptera holds its forewing second digit downwards and almost at right angles to the first digit.

== Distribution ==
It is endemic to New Zealand. As well as at its type locality, the species has been collected at Ben Lomond, Andersons Bay and Colac Bay. It has also been collected at McKinnon Pass.

== Conservation status ==
This species has the "Nationally Vulnerable" conservation status under the New Zealand Threat Classification System.
