= Marasmarcha asiatica =

Scientific classification
- Kingdom: Animalia
- Phylum: Arthropoda
- Class: Insecta
- Order: Lepidoptera
- Family: Pterophoridae
- Genus: Marasmarcha
- Species: M. asiatica

Binomial name
- Marasmarcha asiatica (Rebel, 1906)

Synonyms
- Platyptilia asiatica Rebel, 1906; Marasmarcha aibasovi Ustjuzhanin, 2001

Species of plume moth

Marasmarcha asiatica is a moth of the family Pterophoridae. It is found in China, Iran and Kazakhstan.
