= Bipunctiphorus nigroapicalis =

Scientific classification
- Kingdom: Animalia
- Phylum: Arthropoda
- Clade: Pancrustacea
- Class: Insecta
- Order: Lepidoptera
- Family: Pterophoridae
- Genus: Bipunctiphorus
- Species: B. nigroapicalis

Binomial name
- Bipunctiphorus nigroapicalis (B. Landry & Gielis, 1992)

Synonyms
- Platyptilia nigroapicalis B. Landry & Gielis, 1992

Species of plume moth

Bipunctiphorus nigroapicalis is a moth of the family Pterophoridae. It is known from the Galápagos Islands and Venezuela.

The wingspan is 11–15 mm. Adults are on wing from January to April and in September and October.

== Etymology ==
The name is derived from the dark apex of its forewing lobes.
