= Platyptilia postbarbata =

Scientific classification
- Kingdom: Animalia
- Phylum: Arthropoda
- Clade: Pancrustacea
- Class: Insecta
- Order: Lepidoptera
- Family: Pterophoridae
- Genus: Platyptilia
- Species: P. postbarbata

Binomial name
- Platyptilia postbarbata Meyrick, 1938

Species of plume moth

Platyptilia postbarbata is a moth of the family Pterophoridae. It is known from the Democratic Republic of Congo.
