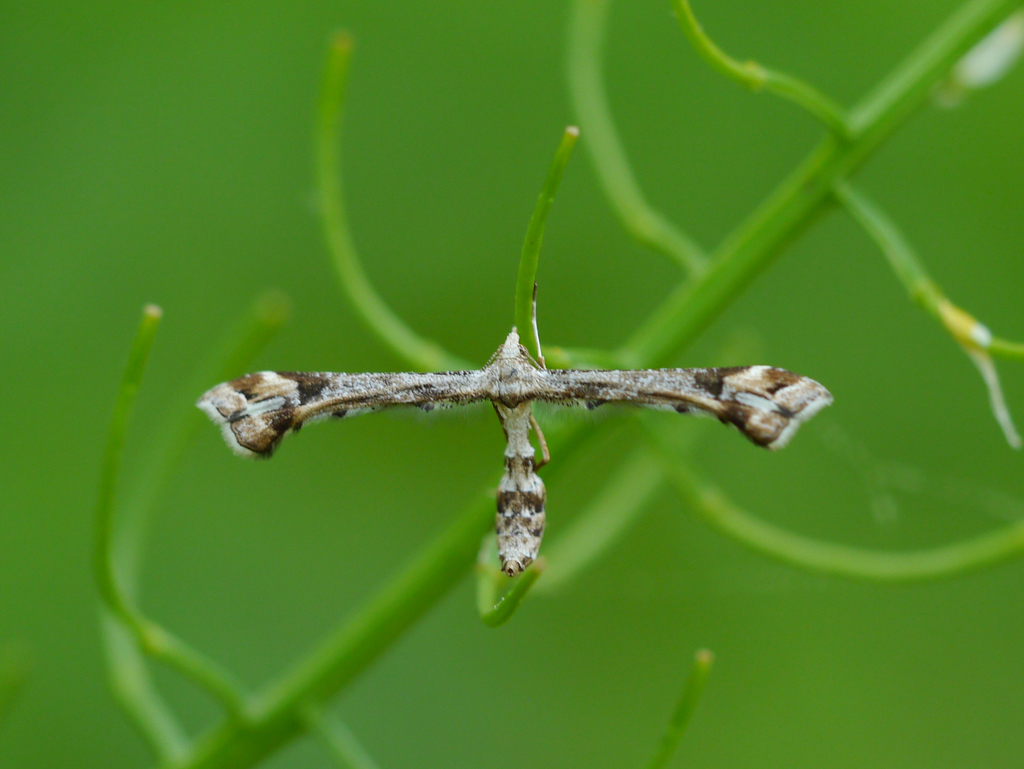

Scientific classification
- Kingdom: Animalia
- Phylum: Arthropoda
- Clade: Pancrustacea
- Class: Insecta
- Order: Lepidoptera
- Family: Pterophoridae
- Genus: Platyptilia
- Species: P. comstocki

Binomial name
- Platyptilia comstocki Lange, 1939

= Platyptilia comstocki =

Species of plume moth

Platyptilia comstocki is a moth of the family Pterophoridae. It is found in North America from Yukon to New Brunswick and south to Arizona and California. The habitat consists of boreal forest.
