= Platyptilia toxochorda =

Scientific classification
- Kingdom: Animalia
- Phylum: Arthropoda
- Clade: Pancrustacea
- Class: Insecta
- Order: Lepidoptera
- Family: Pterophoridae
- Genus: Platyptilia
- Species: P. toxochorda

Binomial name
- Platyptilia toxochorda Meyrick, 1934

Species of plume moth

Platyptilia toxochorda is a moth of the family Pterophoridae. It is known from São Tomé and Principe off the western coast of Central Africa.
