= Platyptilia iberica =

Scientific classification
- Kingdom: Animalia
- Phylum: Arthropoda
- Clade: Pancrustacea
- Class: Insecta
- Order: Lepidoptera
- Family: Pterophoridae
- Genus: Platyptilia
- Species: P. iberica

Binomial name
- Platyptilia iberica Rebel, 1935

Synonyms
- Platyptilia iberica nevadensis Rebel, 1935

Species of plume moth

Platyptilia iberica is a moth of the family Pterophoridae. It is found in the Pyrenees in Spain.

The wingspan 21–23 mm.

The larvae possibly feed on Senecio species.
