= Bipunctiphorus pelzi =

Scientific classification
- Domain: Eukaryota
- Kingdom: Animalia
- Phylum: Arthropoda
- Class: Insecta
- Order: Lepidoptera
- Family: Pterophoridae
- Genus: Bipunctiphorus
- Species: B. pelzi

Binomial name
- Bipunctiphorus pelzi Gielis, 2002

Species of plume moth

Bipunctiphorus pelzi is a moth of the family Pterophoridae. It is known from Ecuador.

The wingspan is 15–16 mm. Adults are on wing in June, September and December.
