= Platyptilia comorensis =

Scientific classification
- Kingdom: Animalia
- Phylum: Arthropoda
- Clade: Pancrustacea
- Class: Insecta
- Order: Lepidoptera
- Family: Pterophoridae
- Genus: Platyptilia
- Species: P. comorensis

Binomial name
- Platyptilia comorensis Gibeaux, 1994

Species of plume moth

Platyptilia comorensis is a moth of the family Pterophoridae. It is known from the Comoros in the Indian Ocean.
