= Platyptilia ussuriensis =

Scientific classification
- Kingdom: Animalia
- Phylum: Arthropoda
- Clade: Pancrustacea
- Class: Insecta
- Order: Lepidoptera
- Family: Pterophoridae
- Genus: Platyptilia
- Species: P. ussuriensis

Binomial name
- Platyptilia ussuriensis Caradja, 1920

Species of plume moth

Platyptilia ussuriensis is a moth of the family Pterophoridae. It is found in Amur Oblast of Russia.
