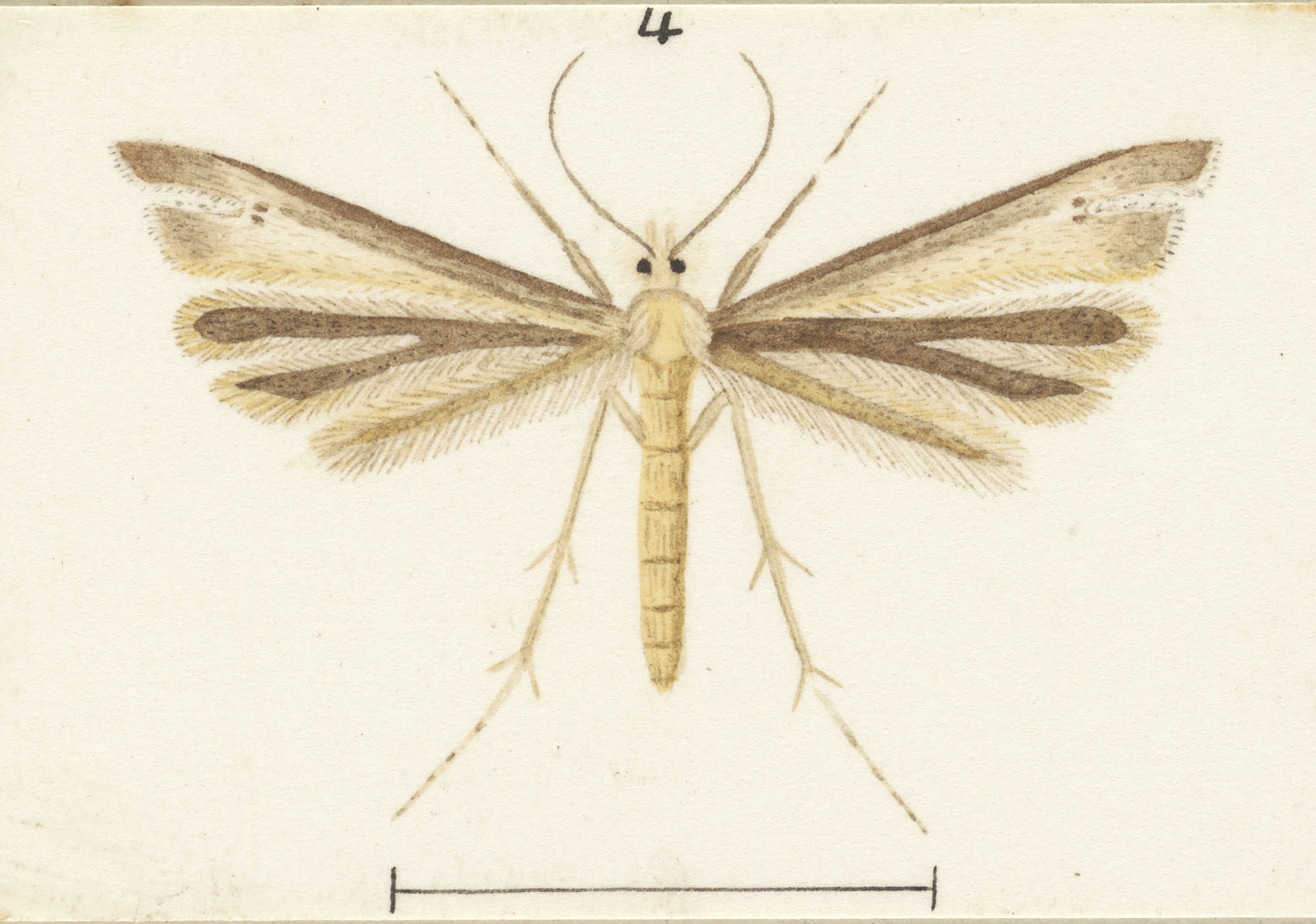
- Male
- Female

Scientific classification
- Kingdom: Animalia
- Phylum: Arthropoda
- Clade: Pancrustacea
- Class: Insecta
- Order: Lepidoptera
- Family: Pterophoridae
- Genus: Platyptilia
- Species: P. charadrias

Binomial name
- Platyptilia charadrias (Meyrick, 1885)

Synonyms
- Mimaeseoptilus charadrias Meyrick, 1885; Stenoptilia charadrias (Meyrick, 1885); Stenoptilia vigens sensu Meyrick, nec Felder & Rogenhofer

= Platyptilia charadrias =

Species of plume moth endemic to New Zealand

Platyptilia charadrias, also known as the alpine plume moth, is a moth of the family Pterophoridae. It was first described by Edward Meyrick in 1885. It is endemic to New Zealand and is found in the South Island where it is known from the mountains, subalpine and valleys of the South Island's main divide. This species has been observed in the Westland, Canterbury, Fiordland and Otago regions. The male and female of P. charadrias exhibit physical differences and have previously been mistaken for different species. Adults have been recorded on the wing in January and February. Hudson noted this species had an affinity for a small sub-alpine shrub resembling species in the genus Cassinia.

== Taxonomy ==
This species was first described by Edward Meyrick in January 1885 using specimens collected at Arthur's Pass from between 1,500 feet (460 m) to 4,000 feet (1,200 m). Meyrick originally named the moth Mimaeseoptilus charadrias. In May 1885 Meyrick gave a fuller description of this species under that name. In 1912 Meyrick mistakenly described and discussed the female of P. charadrias under the name Stenoptilia vigens. In 1913 Meyrick placed this species in the genus Stenoptilia. George Hudson discussed and illustrated this species under the name Stenoptilia charadrias in his 1928 book The butterflies and moths of New Zealand. In that publication Hudson, following Meyrick, also discussed this species under the name Stenoptilia vigens. Hudson corrected this error in 1950 explaining that Meyrick was mistaken when he assigned the name Stenoptilia vigens as the specimens he used were females of S. charadrias. In 1988 John S. Dugdale discussed this species also under the name Stenoptilia charadrias. In 1993 Cees Gielis placed this species in the genus Platyptilia. He confirmed this placement in 2003. The male lectotype specimen, collected by Meyrick at Ōtira Gorge in Westland, is held at the Natural History Museum, London.

== Description ==
Meyrick described this species as follows:

Male, female.—16-20 mm. Head, palpi, thorax, and abdomen whitish-ochreous. Antennae fuscous. Legs fuscous-whitish, internally dark fuscous. Forewings light fuscous, more or less suffused with whitish-ochreous posteriorly and towards inner margin, suffused with whitish along sub-median fold (broadly posteriorly) and on a costal spot above base of cleft ; costa suffused with dark fuscous, anteriorly obscurely spotted with whitish ; a small blackish spot before cleft, in female larger and touching cleft ; in female a suffused blackish triangular subapical patch, terminated by a whitish line a little before hindmargin ; in male the whitish line broader and suffused into hindmargin, but blackish patch wholly absent: cilia whitish-fuscous, within cleft and on hindmargin of first segment white, with a dark fuscous line from middle of first segment to anal angle, on costa dark fuscous. Hindwings and cilia fuscous.

Meyrick pointed out that the sexes might be mistaken for two distinct species.

== Distribution ==
This species is endemic to New Zealand. This species is found in the South Island and has been observed in Westland, Canterbury, Fiordland and Otago. Meyrick stated that although this species could be found in subalpine habitats it more commonly appears at lower altitudes.

== Habitat and hosts ==
This species inhabits subalpine and alpine valley habitat. Hudson indicated that this species had an affinity for a small sub-alpine shrub resembling species in the genus Cassinia.

== Behaviour ==
This species is on the wing in January and February.
