= Platyptilia bowkeri =

Scientific classification
- Kingdom: Animalia
- Phylum: Arthropoda
- Clade: Pancrustacea
- Class: Insecta
- Order: Lepidoptera
- Family: Pterophoridae
- Genus: Platyptilia
- Species: P. bowkeri

Binomial name
- Platyptilia bowkeri Kovtunovich & Ustjuzhanin, 2011

Species of plume moth

Platyptilia bowkeri is a moth of the family Pterophoridae. It is found in Lesotho.
