= Platyptilia longiloba =

Scientific classification
- Kingdom: Animalia
- Phylum: Arthropoda
- Clade: Pancrustacea
- Class: Insecta
- Order: Lepidoptera
- Family: Pterophoridae
- Genus: Platyptilia
- Species: P. longiloba

Binomial name
- Platyptilia longiloba Gibeaux, 1997

Species of plume moth

Platyptilia longiloba is a moth of the family Pterophoridae.
