= Platyptilia archimedon =

Scientific classification
- Kingdom: Animalia
- Phylum: Arthropoda
- Clade: Pancrustacea
- Class: Insecta
- Order: Lepidoptera
- Family: Pterophoridae
- Genus: Platyptilia
- Species: P. archimedon

Binomial name
- Platyptilia archimedon Meyrick, 1938

Species of plume moth

Platyptilia archimedon is a species of moth from the family Pterophoridae. It is known from New Guinea.
