= Platyptilia johnstoni =

Scientific classification
- Kingdom: Animalia
- Phylum: Arthropoda
- Clade: Pancrustacea
- Class: Insecta
- Order: Lepidoptera
- Family: Pterophoridae
- Genus: Platyptilia
- Species: P. johnstoni

Binomial name
- Platyptilia johnstoni Lange, 1940

Synonyms
- Platyptilia tshukotka Ustjuzhanin, 1996

Species of plume moth

Platyptilia johnstoni is a moth of the family Pterophoridae first described by Lange in 1940. It is found in Russia and Alaska in the United States.

The wingspan is 19–24 mm.
