= Marasmarcha sisyrodes =

Scientific classification
- Kingdom: Animalia
- Phylum: Arthropoda
- Class: Insecta
- Order: Lepidoptera
- Family: Pterophoridae
- Genus: Marasmarcha
- Species: M. sisyrodes

Binomial name
- Marasmarcha sisyrodes Meyrick, 1921

Synonyms
- Platyptilia proterischna Meyrick, 1935

Species of plume moth

Marasmarcha sisyrodes is a moth of the family Pterophoridae. It is known from Cameroon, the Democratic Republic of Congo and Zimbabwe.
