= Platyptilia cretalis =

Scientific classification
- Kingdom: Animalia
- Phylum: Arthropoda
- Clade: Pancrustacea
- Class: Insecta
- Order: Lepidoptera
- Family: Pterophoridae
- Genus: Platyptilia
- Species: P. cretalis

Binomial name
- Platyptilia cretalis Meyrick, 1908

Synonyms
- Stenoptilia cretalis (Meyrick, 1908); Platyptilia kiliensis Matsumura, 1931

Species of plume moth

Platyptilia cretalis is a moth of the family Pterophoridae. It is found in the Honshu, Kyushu and Tsushima islands of Japan.

The length of the forewings is 9–12 mm. Adults are on wing from May to September.
