= Platyptilia gentiliae =

Scientific classification
- Kingdom: Animalia
- Phylum: Arthropoda
- Clade: Pancrustacea
- Class: Insecta
- Order: Lepidoptera
- Family: Pterophoridae
- Genus: Platyptilia
- Species: P. gentiliae

Binomial name
- Platyptilia gentiliae Gielis, 1991

Species of plume moth

Platyptilia gentiliae is a moth of the family Pterophoridae. It is known from Argentina and Chile.

The wingspan is about 17 mm. Adults are on wing in October and January.
