= Marasmarcha tugaicola =

Scientific classification
- Domain: Eukaryota
- Kingdom: Animalia
- Phylum: Arthropoda
- Class: Insecta
- Order: Lepidoptera
- Family: Pterophoridae
- Genus: Marasmarcha
- Species: M. tugaicola

Binomial name
- Marasmarcha tugaicola Zagulajev, 1986

Species of plume moth

Marasmarcha tugaicola is a moth of the family Pterophoridae.
