= Platyptilia isodactylus =

Scientific classification
- Kingdom: Animalia
- Phylum: Arthropoda
- Clade: Pancrustacea
- Class: Insecta
- Order: Lepidoptera
- Family: Pterophoridae
- Genus: Platyptilia
- Species: P. isodactylus

Binomial name
- Platyptilia isodactylus (Zeller, 1852)

Synonyms
- Platyptilia isodactyla (Zeller, 1853); Pterophorus isodactylus Zeller, 1852; Platyptilia brunneodactyla D. Lucas, 1955

Species of plume moth

Platyptilia isodactylus (ragwort plume moth or ragwort crown-boring plume moth) is a moth of the family Pterophoridae found in China, Europe and was introduced to Australia and New Zealand for biological control. It was first described by the German entomologists, Philipp Christoph Zeller in 1852.

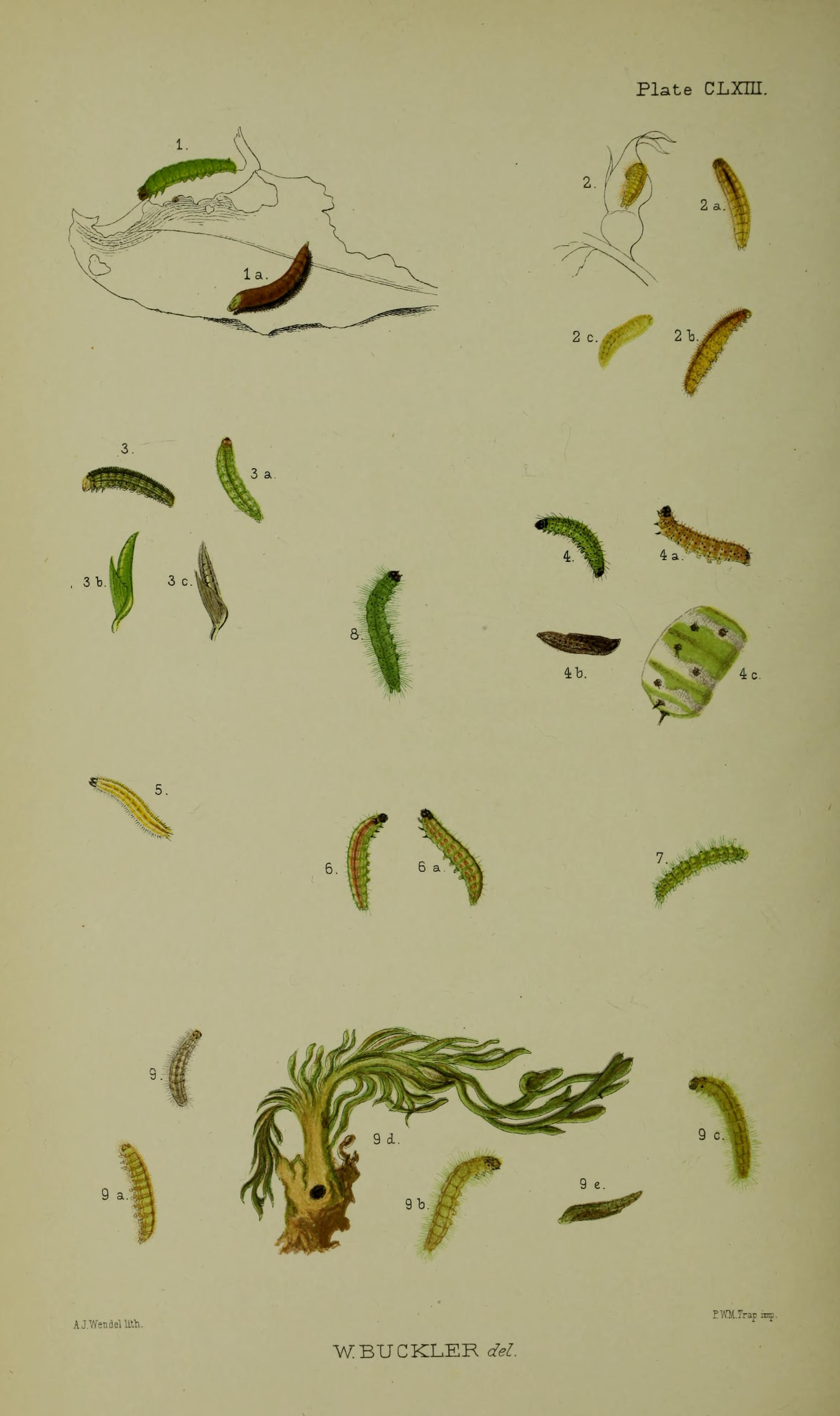
Figs 4, 4a, larva after final moult larvae in various stages of growth 4b pupa 4c enlarged view of segment

== Description ==
The wingspan is 21–23 mm. The forewings are brown, the costa is anteriorly dark fuscous, whitish-sprinkled with a very ill -defined dark fuscous triangular blotch on costa beyond middle, the apex forming a distinct dot. There are faint traces of a pale subterminal line; apical 2/3 of terminal cilia white. The hindwings are dark fuscous scale-tooth moderate, in middle. The larva is pale green; dorsal line darker; subdorsal darker, whitish -edged above; lateral and spiracular faintly whitish; head and tubercles black.

== Biology ==
Moths are on the wing in June and then again in August and September.

The larvae feed in the stems of Senecio aquaticus.

== Distribution ==
It is native to central Europe, Mediterranean North Africa and southern Europe. It has also been recorded from China. It has been introduced in Australia and New Zealand as a biological control agent for ragwort.
