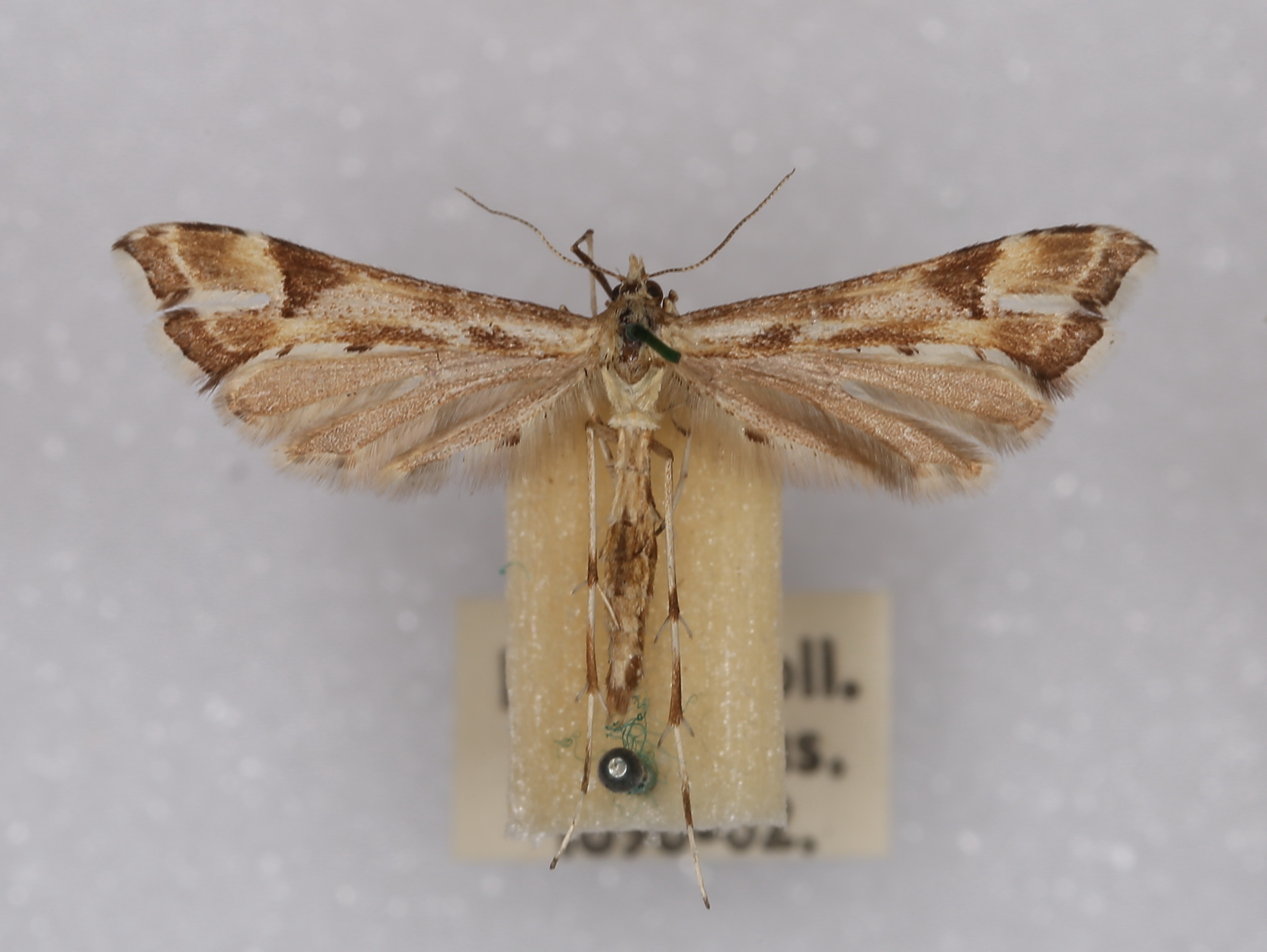
- Platyptilia calodactyla (Denis & Schiffermüller, 1775), specimen, Natural History Museum

Scientific classification
- Kingdom: Animalia
- Phylum: Arthropoda
- Clade: Pancrustacea
- Class: Insecta
- Order: Lepidoptera
- Family: Pterophoridae
- Genus: Platyptilia
- Species: P. calodactyla

Binomial name
- Platyptilia calodactyla (Denis & Schiffermüller, 1775)

Synonyms
- List: Alucita calodactyla Denis & Schiffermüller, 1775; Alucita petradactyla Hübner, 1819; Pterophorus zetterstedti Zeller, 1841; Platyptilia taeniadactyla South, 1882; Platyptilia leucorrhyncha Meyrick, 1902; Platyptilia calodactyla f. doronicella Fuchs, 1902

= Platyptilia calodactyla =

Species of plume moth

Platyptilia calodactyla is a moth of the family Pterophoridae found in Asia and Europe. It was first described by the Austrian entomologists, Michael Denis & Ignaz Schiffermüller in 1775.

== Description ==
The wingspan is 18–25 mm.

Platyptilia calodactyla differs from Platyptilia gonodactyla as follows : forewings with termen distinctly less sinuate, apical spot in cilia lighter and apex appearing less falcate, colour rather darker and more ochreous tinged, less strigulated with white, especially posteriorly.

== Biology ==
Adults are single brooded and emerge in June and July.

The larvae feed in the stem of European goldenrod (Solidago virgaurea), Senecio nemorensis, heath groundsel (Senecio sylvaticus) and leopard's bane (Doronicum species), sometimes causing wilting of the leaves.

== Distribution ==
It is found in most of Europe, except Portugal, Hungary, Romania, Ukraine and Greece. It has also been recorded from Iran.
