= Platyptilia melitroctis =

Scientific classification
- Kingdom: Animalia
- Phylum: Arthropoda
- Clade: Pancrustacea
- Class: Insecta
- Order: Lepidoptera
- Family: Pterophoridae
- Genus: Platyptilia
- Species: P. melitroctis

Binomial name
- Platyptilia melitroctis Meyrick, 1924

Species of plume moth

Platyptilia melitroctis is a moth of the family Pterophoridae. It is known from Uganda.
