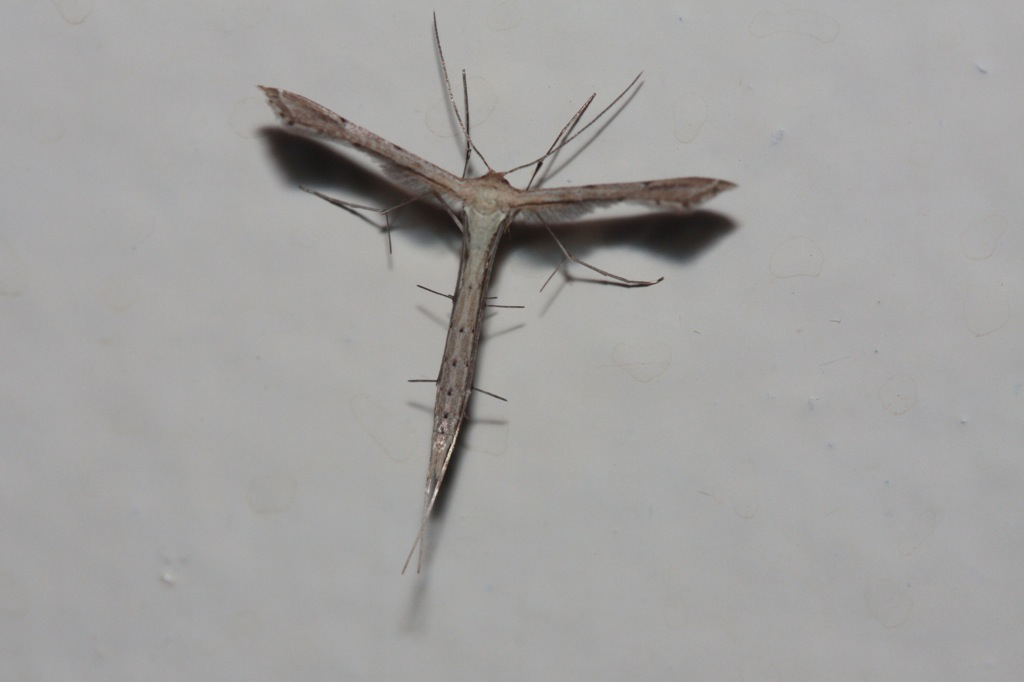
- Bipunctiphorus euctimena

Scientific classification
- Kingdom: Animalia
- Phylum: Arthropoda
- Clade: Pancrustacea
- Class: Insecta
- Order: Lepidoptera
- Family: Pterophoridae
- Subfamily: Pterophorinae
- Tribe: Platyptiliini
- Genus: Bipunctiphorus; Gibeaux, 1994

= Bipunctiphorus =

Plume moth genus

Bipunctiphorus is a genus of moths in the family Pterophoridae described by Christian Gibeaux in 1994.

== Species ==
- Bipunctiphorus dimorpha (T. B. Fletcher, 1910) (=Bipunctiphorus etiennei Gibeaux, 1994)
- Bipunctiphorus dissipata (Yano, 1963)
- Bipunctiphorus euctimena (Turner, 1913)
- Bipunctiphorus nigroapicalis B. Landry & Gielis, 1992
- Bipunctiphorus pelzi Gielis, 2003
