= Platyptilia chosokeiella =

Scientific classification
- Kingdom: Animalia
- Phylum: Arthropoda
- Clade: Pancrustacea
- Class: Insecta
- Order: Lepidoptera
- Family: Pterophoridae
- Genus: Platyptilia
- Species: P. chosokeiella

Binomial name
- Platyptilia chosokeiella Strand, 1922

Species of plume moth

Platyptilia chosokeiella is a moth of the family Pterophoridae. It is found in central Vietnam, Taiwan and Cambodia.
