= Platyptilia longalis =

Scientific classification
- Kingdom: Animalia
- Phylum: Arthropoda
- Clade: Pancrustacea
- Class: Insecta
- Order: Lepidoptera
- Family: Pterophoridae
- Genus: Platyptilia
- Species: P. longalis

Binomial name
- Platyptilia longalis (Walker, 1864)

Synonyms
- Pterophorus longalis Walker, 1864; Stenoptilia longalis

Species of plume moth

Platyptilia longalis is a moth of the family Pterophoridae. It is known from South Africa.
