= Platyptilia nussi =

Scientific classification
- Kingdom: Animalia
- Phylum: Arthropoda
- Clade: Pancrustacea
- Class: Insecta
- Order: Lepidoptera
- Family: Pterophoridae
- Genus: Platyptilia
- Species: P. nussi

Binomial name
- Platyptilia nussi Gielis, 2003

Species of plume moth

Platyptilia nussi is a moth of the family Pterophoroidea. It is found on Luzon in the Philippines.

The wingspan is about 19 mm. Adults are on wing in November.
