= Platyptilia picta =

Scientific classification
- Kingdom: Animalia
- Phylum: Arthropoda
- Clade: Pancrustacea
- Class: Insecta
- Order: Lepidoptera
- Family: Pterophoridae
- Genus: Platyptilia
- Species: P. picta

Binomial name
- Platyptilia picta Meyrick, 1913

Species of plume moth

Platyptilia picta is a moth of the family Pterophoridae. It is known from Kenya.
