= Platyptilia davisi =

Scientific classification
- Kingdom: Animalia
- Phylum: Arthropoda
- Clade: Pancrustacea
- Class: Insecta
- Order: Lepidoptera
- Family: Pterophoridae
- Genus: Platyptilia
- Species: P. davisi

Binomial name
- Platyptilia davisi Gielis, 1991

Species of plume moth

Platyptilia davisi is a moth of the family Pterophoridae. It is known from Chile.

The wingspan is about 22 mm. Adults are on wing in January.
