= Platyptilia ainonis =

Scientific classification
- Kingdom: Animalia
- Phylum: Arthropoda
- Clade: Pancrustacea
- Class: Insecta
- Order: Lepidoptera
- Family: Pterophoridae
- Genus: Platyptilia
- Species: P. ainonis

Binomial name
- Platyptilia ainonis Matsumura, 1931

Species of plume moth

Platyptilia ainonis is a moth of the family Pterophoridae. It is known from Japan (Hokkaido, Honshu), Kyrgyzstan and Tajikistan.

== Description ==
The length of the forewings is 10–12 mm.

The larvae probably feed on Anaphalis margaritacea.
