= Platyptilia pauliani =

Scientific classification
- Kingdom: Animalia
- Phylum: Arthropoda
- Clade: Pancrustacea
- Class: Insecta
- Order: Lepidoptera
- Family: Pterophoridae
- Genus: Platyptilia
- Species: P. pauliani

Binomial name
- Platyptilia pauliani Gibeaux, 1994

Species of plume moth

Platyptilia pauliani is a moth of the family Pterophoridae. It is known from Madagascar.

The larvae feed on Calendula species and Emilia citrina.
