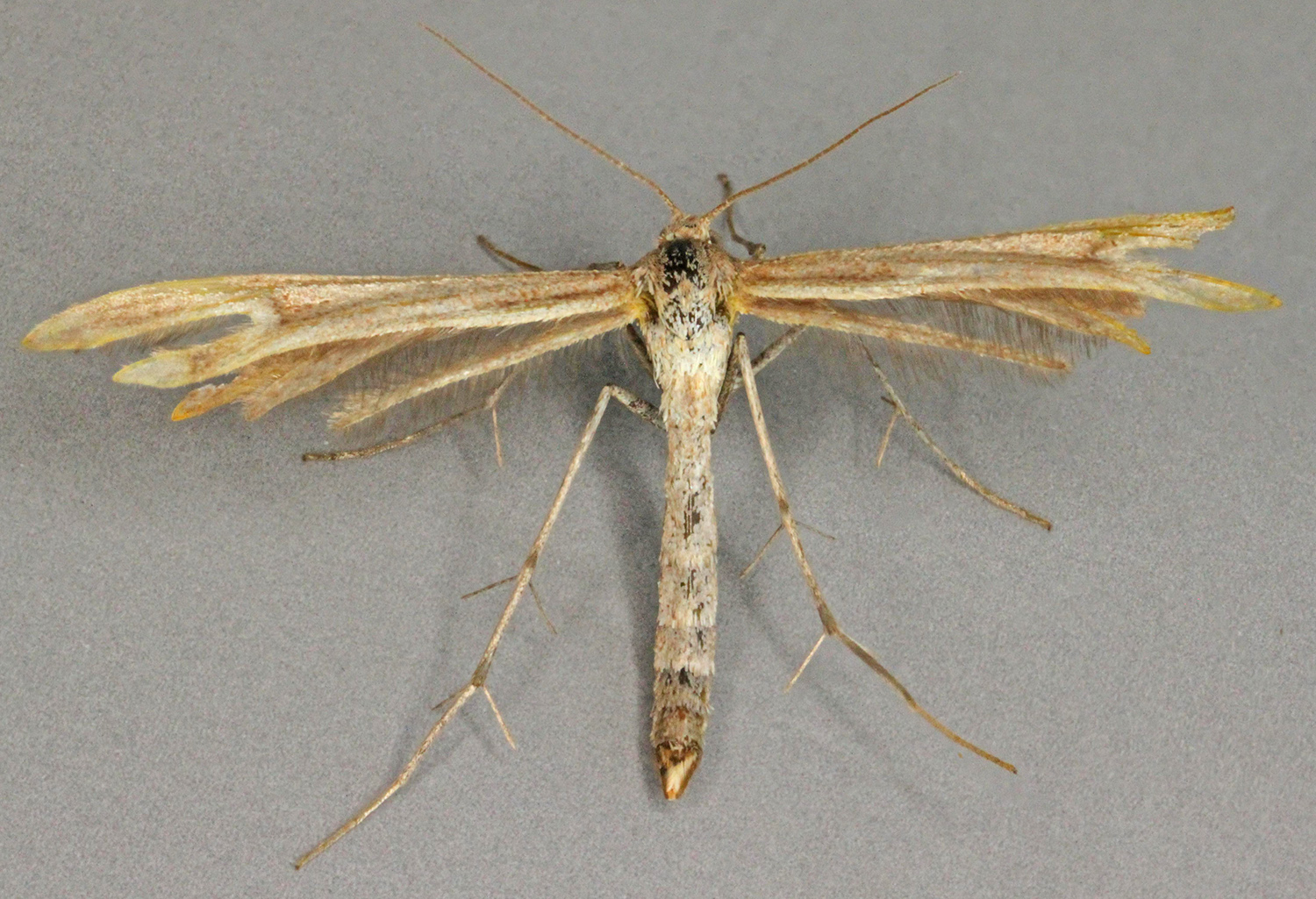
- Marasmarcha lunaedactyla

Scientific classification
- Kingdom: Animalia
- Phylum: Arthropoda
- Class: Insecta
- Order: Lepidoptera
- Family: Pterophoridae
- Subfamily: Pterophorinae
- Tribe: Marasmarchini
- Genus: Marasmarcha; Meyrick, 1886

= Marasmarcha =

Plume moth genus

Marasmarcha is a genus of moths in the family Pterophoridae erected by Edward Meyrick in 1886.

== Species ==
As of version 1.1.23.125, the Catalogue of the Pterophoroidea of the World lists the following three species for the genus:

- Marasmarcha ammonias Meyrick, 1909
- Marasmarcha asiatica (Rebel, 1902)
- Marasmarcha bengtssoni (Gielis, 2009)
- Marasmarcha bonaespei (Walsingham, 1881)
- Marasmarcha brevirostris (Walsingham, 1915)
- Marasmarcha cinnamomeus (Staudinger, 1870)
- Marasmarcha colossa Caradja, 1920
- Marasmarcha corniculata (Meyrick, 1913)
- Marasmarcha ehrenbergianus (Zeller, 1841)
- Marasmarcha empedota (Meyrick, 1908)
- Marasmarcha fauna (Millière, 1871)
- Marasmarcha iranica Arenberger, 1999
- Marasmarcha lamborni Kovtunovich & Ustjuzhanin, 2014
- Marasmarcha locharcha (Meyrick, 1924)
- Marasmarcha lunaedactyla (Haworth, 1811)
- Marasmarcha lydia Ustjuzhanin, 1996
- Marasmarcha oxydactylus (Staudinger, 1859)
- Marasmarcha picardi Gibeaux, 1990
- Marasmarcha pulcher (Christoph, 1885)
- Marasmarcha rhypodactylus (Staudinger, 1870)
- Marasmarcha rubriacuta (Gielis, 2009)
- Marasmarcha samarcandica Gerasimov, 1930
- Marasmarcha sisyrodes Meyrick, 1921
- Marasmarcha spinosa Meyrick, 1925
- Marasmarcha tugaicola Zagulajev, 1986
