= Platyptilia gravior =

Scientific classification
- Kingdom: Animalia
- Phylum: Arthropoda
- Clade: Pancrustacea
- Class: Insecta
- Order: Lepidoptera
- Family: Pterophoridae
- Genus: Platyptilia
- Species: P. gravior

Binomial name
- Platyptilia gravior Meyrick, 1932

Synonyms
- Platyptilia juanvinas Gielis, 1999

Species of plume moth

Platyptilia gravior is a moth of the family Pterophoridae. It is known from Costa Rica.

The wingspan is 24–28 mm. Adults are on wing in April, May and June.
