= Platyptilia thyellopa =

Scientific classification
- Kingdom: Animalia
- Phylum: Arthropoda
- Clade: Pancrustacea
- Class: Insecta
- Order: Lepidoptera
- Family: Pterophoridae
- Genus: Platyptilia
- Species: P. thyellopa

Binomial name
- Platyptilia thyellopa Meyrick, 1926

Species of plume moth

Platyptilia thyellopa is a moth of the family Pterophoridae. It is known from Bolivia, Colombia and Ecuador.

The wingspan is 22–28 mm. Adults are on wing from October to February.
