= Platyptilia anniei =

Scientific classification
- Kingdom: Animalia
- Phylum: Arthropoda
- Clade: Pancrustacea
- Class: Insecta
- Order: Lepidoptera
- Family: Pterophoridae
- Genus: Platyptilia
- Species: P. anniei

Binomial name
- Platyptilia anniei Gielis, 1997

Species of plume moth

Platyptilia anniei is a moth of the family Pterophoridae. It is known from Bolivia, Ecuador, Peru and Venezuela.

The wingspan is 19–24 mm. Adults are on wing in September, October, December, February, May and June.
