= Platyptilia rubriacuta =

Scientific classification
- Kingdom: Animalia
- Phylum: Arthropoda
- Clade: Pancrustacea
- Class: Insecta
- Order: Lepidoptera
- Family: Pterophoridae
- Genus: Platyptilia
- Species: P. rubriacuta

Binomial name
- Platyptilia rubriacuta Gielis, 2009

Species of plume moth

Platyptilia rubriacuta is a moth of the family Pterophoridae.

== Distribution ==
It is found in the Haut-Katanga District of the Democratic Republic of the Congo.
