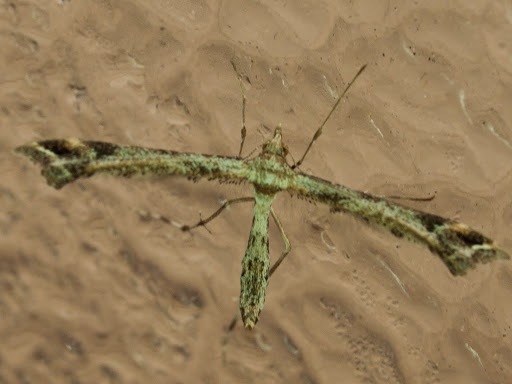

Scientific classification
- Kingdom: Animalia
- Phylum: Arthropoda
- Clade: Pancrustacea
- Class: Insecta
- Order: Lepidoptera
- Family: Pterophoridae
- Genus: Platyptilia
- Species: P. williamsii

Binomial name
- Platyptilia williamsii Grinnell, 1908

= Platyptilia williamsii =

Species of plume moth

Platyptilia williamsii (calendula plume moth) is a moth of the family Pterophoridae. It is known from western North America, including California.

The head and thorax have mixed ocherous-brown and whitish scales. The antennae are brown dotted above. The forewings are ocherous-brown with dark brown patches, with white irroration (speckling) forming a trace of transverse wavy lines and dotting the brown costa. The fringes are brownish gray with whitish bases containing brown and white scales. The hindwings and fringes are gray-brown.

The larvae feed on Calendula species, as well as Senecio aronicoides and Senecio jacobaea.
