= Marasmarcha colossa =

Scientific classification
- Kingdom: Animalia
- Phylum: Arthropoda
- Clade: Pancrustacea
- Class: Insecta
- Order: Lepidoptera
- Family: Pterophoridae
- Genus: Marasmarcha
- Species: M. colossa

Binomial name
- Marasmarcha colossa Caradja, 1920

Species of plume moth

Marasmarcha colossa is a moth of the family Pterophoridae. It is found in Russia (the West Siberian Plain), Turkmenistan., Kyrgyzstan, Kazakhstan, Afghanistan and Tajikistan.
