= Platyptilia kozanica =

Scientific classification
- Kingdom: Animalia
- Phylum: Arthropoda
- Clade: Pancrustacea
- Class: Insecta
- Order: Lepidoptera
- Family: Pterophoridae
- Genus: Platyptilia
- Species: P. kozanica

Binomial name
- Platyptilia kozanica Fazekas, 2003

Species of plume moth

Platyptilia kozanica is a moth of the family Pterophoridae. It is known from Turkey.

The wingspan is about 21 mm. Adults are on wing in May.
