= Marasmarcha cinnamomeus =

Scientific classification
- Domain: Eukaryota
- Kingdom: Animalia
- Phylum: Arthropoda
- Class: Insecta
- Order: Lepidoptera
- Family: Pterophoridae
- Genus: Marasmarcha
- Species: M. cinnamomeus

Binomial name
- Marasmarcha cinnamomeus (Staudinger, 1871)

Synonyms
- Pterophorus cinnamomeus Staudinger, 1870; Marasmarcha glycyrrhizae Zagulajev, 1969

Species of plume moth

Marasmarcha cinnamomeus is a moth of the family Pterophoridae. It is found in the European part of Russia and Tajikistan.
