= Platyptilia eberti =

Scientific classification
- Kingdom: Animalia
- Phylum: Arthropoda
- Clade: Pancrustacea
- Class: Insecta
- Order: Lepidoptera
- Family: Pterophoridae
- Genus: Platyptilia
- Species: P. eberti

Binomial name
- Platyptilia eberti Gielis, 2003

Species of plume moth

Platyptilia eberti is a moth of the family Pterophoroidea. It is found in Luzon, Philippines, and was recently discovered in Vietnam, although this record might represent a related undescribed species.

The wingspan is about 17 mm. Adults are on wing in November.

== Etymology ==
The species is called after Mr W. Ebert, one of the collectors.
