= Marasmarcha picardi =

Scientific classification
- Kingdom: Animalia
- Phylum: Arthropoda
- Clade: Pancrustacea
- Class: Insecta
- Order: Lepidoptera
- Family: Pterophoridae
- Genus: Marasmarcha
- Species: M. picardi

Binomial name
- Marasmarcha picardi Gibeaux, 1990

Species of plume moth

Marasmarcha picardi is a moth of the family Pterophoridae.
