= Platyptilia sedata =

Scientific classification
- Kingdom: Animalia
- Phylum: Arthropoda
- Clade: Pancrustacea
- Class: Insecta
- Order: Lepidoptera
- Family: Pterophoridae
- Genus: Platyptilia
- Species: P. sedata

Binomial name
- Platyptilia sedata Meyrick, 1932

Synonyms
- Platyptilia semnocharis Meyrick, 1932

Species of plume moth

Platyptilia sedata is a moth of the family Pterophoridae. It is found in the Kashmir region of what was British India.
