= Platyptilia albicans =

Scientific classification
- Kingdom: Animalia
- Phylum: Arthropoda
- Clade: Pancrustacea
- Class: Insecta
- Order: Lepidoptera
- Family: Pterophoridae
- Genus: Platyptilia
- Species: P. albicans

Binomial name
- Platyptilia albicans Fish, 1881

Species of plume moth

Platyptilia albicans is a moth of the family Pterophoridae. It is found in North America (including California, Oregon, Nevada, Wyoming, British Columbia and Alberta).

The wingspan is 17–24 mm. The head and thorax are cream coloured. The antennae are cinnamon brown, dotted above with white. The abdomen is ochreous, but lighter at the base and the legs are whitish. The forewings are creamy white along the hind margin, on the costa cinnamon brown. There is a cinnamon brown costal triangular spot, bordered outwardly above the fissure by a broad white line. Below the fissure its apex is continuous with the brownish colour of the second lobe. Both lobes are cinnamon brown, with a transverse white line not reaching the hind margin of the second lobe. The fringes are cream coloured, sprinkled with cinnamon brown. The hindwings are cinnamon brown, with concolorous fringes.
