= Marasmarcha iranica =

Scientific classification
- Kingdom: Animalia
- Phylum: Arthropoda
- Class: Insecta
- Order: Lepidoptera
- Family: Pterophoridae
- Genus: Marasmarcha
- Species: M. iranica

Binomial name
- Marasmarcha iranica Arenberger, 1999

Species of plume moth

Marasmarcha iranica is a moth of the family Pterophoridae. It is found in Iran.

The wingspan is 20–24 mm.
