= Platyptilia microbscura =

Scientific classification
- Kingdom: Animalia
- Phylum: Arthropoda
- Clade: Pancrustacea
- Class: Insecta
- Order: Lepidoptera
- Family: Pterophoridae
- Genus: Platyptilia
- Species: P. microbscura

Binomial name
- Platyptilia microbscura Gielis & De Vos, 2007

Species of plume moth

Platyptilia microbscura is a moth of the family Pterophoridae. It is known from Misool Island in Indonesia.
