= Platyptilia isoterma =

Scientific classification
- Kingdom: Animalia
- Phylum: Arthropoda
- Clade: Pancrustacea
- Class: Insecta
- Order: Lepidoptera
- Family: Pterophoridae
- Genus: Platyptilia
- Species: P. isoterma

Binomial name
- Platyptilia isoterma Meyrick, 1909

Species of plume moth

Platyptilia isoterma is a moth of the family Pterophoridae. It is found in New Zealand.

The wingspan is about 18 mm. The head is white mixed with dark reddish-fuscous. The antennae are grey with a blackish line above. The thorax is whitish irrorated (speckled) with dark reddish-fuscous and the abdomen is dark reddish-fuscous sprinkled with whitish, and mixed with blackish on the sides towards the middle. The forewings are reddish-fuscous irrorated with whitish and sprinkled with dark fuscous. The hindwings are grey, mixed with black scales on the dorsum.
