= Platyptilia cacaliae =

Scientific classification
- Kingdom: Animalia
- Phylum: Arthropoda
- Clade: Pancrustacea
- Class: Insecta
- Order: Lepidoptera
- Family: Pterophoridae
- Genus: Platyptilia
- Species: P. cacaliae

Binomial name
- Platyptilia cacaliae T. B. Fletcher, 1920

Species of plume moth

Platyptilia cacaliae is a moth of the family Pterophoridae. It was described by Thomas Bainbrigge Fletcher in 1920 and it is found in India.

The head is greyish fuscous and the antennae are greyish, obscurely ringed with fuscous. The thorax is greyish fuscous and the legs are whitish. The abdomen is greyish, irrorated (speckled) with fuscous. The forewings are brownish grey irrorated with white and reddish brown. The hindwings are fuscous grey, irrorated with fuscous brown.

Adults have been found flying over flowers of Cacalia coccinea. The larvae and pupae were found in the flower-heads.
