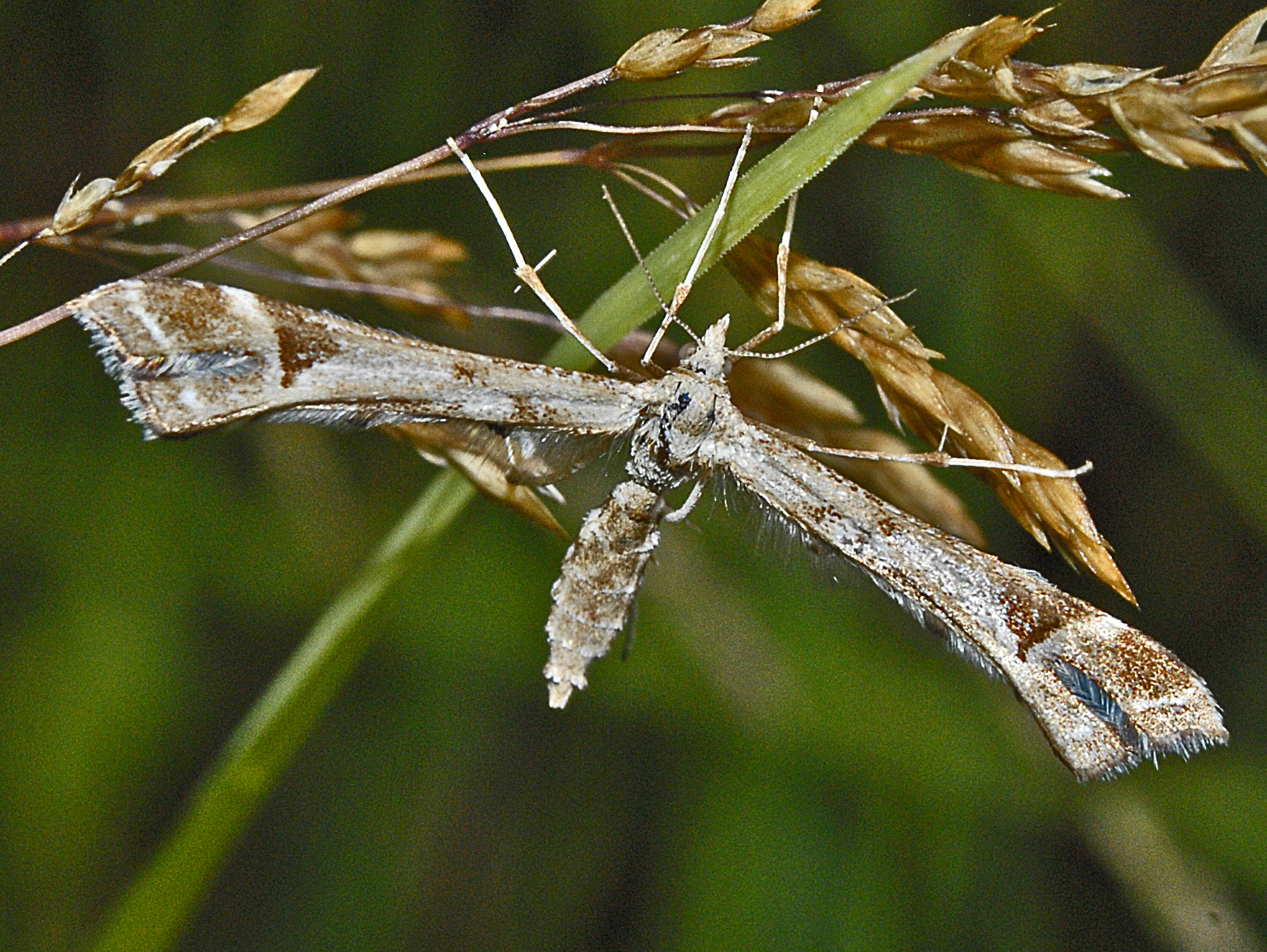
- Platyptilia gonodactyla

Scientific classification
- Kingdom: Animalia
- Phylum: Arthropoda
- Clade: Pancrustacea
- Class: Insecta
- Order: Lepidoptera
- Family: Pterophoridae
- Genus: Platyptilia
- Species: P. gonodactyla

Binomial name
- Platyptilia gonodactyla (Denis & Schiffermüller, 1775)

Synonyms
- List: Alucita gonodactyla Denis & Schiffermuller, 1775; Alucita diptera Sulzer, 1776; Platyptilia farfara Gregson, 1885; Alucita megadactyla Denis & Schiffermuller, 1775; Alucita trigonodactyla Haworth, 1811

= Platyptilia gonodactyla =

Species of plume moth

Platyptilia gonodactyla, also known as the triangle plume, is a moth of the family Pterophoridae found in temperate Asia and Europe. It was first described by the Austrian entomologists, Michael Denis & Ignaz Schiffermüller in 1775.

== Distribution ==
This species can be found in the Palearctic realm. It has a widespread distribution in Britain.

== Habitat ==
These moths inhabit open, grassy areas, waste ground, meadows and spruce forest edge.

== Description ==
The wingspan is 22–28 mm. They have pale brown or grayish wings with chestnut coloured markings towards the tips. This species is very similar to Platyptilia nemoralis, and Platyptilia calodactyla but it shows a very small scaletooth at the dorsum of the third lobe.

The caterpillars are about six millimeters long at the end of March. They have a glossy black head and black mouthparts, prothoracal shield and thoracic legs. The body is yellow, with a broad reddish back.

== Biology ==
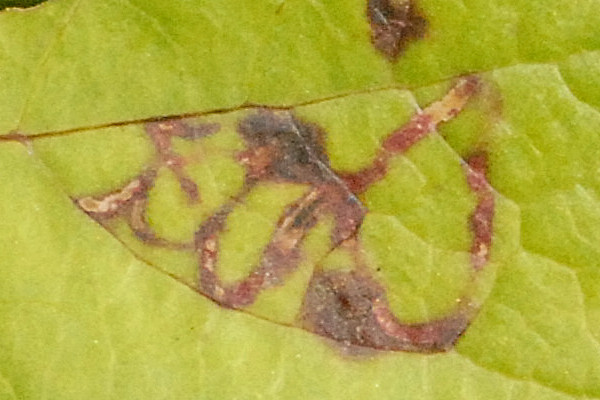
Mines of a larva in a leaf

The moths fly from May to October depending on the location and are active at dusk and night. This species has two generation a year, in June and in late July–September.

The larvae feed on coltsfoot (Tussilago farfara) and sometimes also butterbur (Petasites species). The larvae of the spring generation feed in the stem from the base up to the receptacle of the flower head, with pupation taking place either there or on a leaf. The summer generation are miners. The mine consists of a small, transparent, irregularly shaped full depth mine and there are often several in a single leaf. The frass is granular but there is little to be seen, or it is missing completely. After some time the larvae feeds freely on the underside of the leaf or under a folded leaf margin.
