= Platyptilia semnopis =

Scientific classification
- Kingdom: Animalia
- Phylum: Arthropoda
- Clade: Pancrustacea
- Class: Insecta
- Order: Lepidoptera
- Family: Pterophoridae
- Genus: Platyptilia
- Species: P. semnopis

Binomial name
- Platyptilia semnopis Meyrick, 1931

Synonyms
- Platyptilia jonesi Gielis, 1997

Species of plume moth

Platyptilia semnopis is a moth of the family Pterophoridae. It is known from Brazil.

The wingspan is about 24 mm. Adults are on wing in January, February, May, July, September, October and December.
