= Marasmarcha spinosa =

Scientific classification
- Kingdom: Animalia
- Phylum: Arthropoda
- Class: Insecta
- Order: Lepidoptera
- Family: Pterophoridae
- Genus: Marasmarcha
- Species: M. spinosa

Binomial name
- Marasmarcha spinosa Meyrick, 1925

Species of plume moth

Marasmarcha spinosa is a moth of the family Pterophoridae.
