= Platyptilia vilema =

Scientific classification
- Kingdom: Animalia
- Phylum: Arthropoda
- Clade: Pancrustacea
- Class: Insecta
- Order: Lepidoptera
- Family: Pterophoridae
- Genus: Platyptilia
- Species: P. vilema

Binomial name
- Platyptilia vilema B. Landry, 1993

Species of plume moth

Platyptilia vilema is a moth of the family Pterophoridae. It is known from the Galápagos Islands.

The wingspan is 16–21 mm. Adults are on wing in March and April.

The larvae feed on Darwiniathamus species.
