= Platyptilia naminga =

Scientific classification
- Kingdom: Animalia
- Phylum: Arthropoda
- Clade: Pancrustacea
- Class: Insecta
- Order: Lepidoptera
- Family: Pterophoridae
- Genus: Platyptilia
- Species: P. naminga

Binomial name
- Platyptilia naminga Ustjuzhanin, 1996

Species of plume moth

Platyptilia naminga is a moth of the family Pterophoridae. It is found in Chita Oblast, Russia.
