= Bipunctiphorus dissipata =

Scientific classification
- Kingdom: Animalia
- Phylum: Arthropoda
- Class: Insecta
- Order: Lepidoptera
- Family: Pterophoridae
- Genus: Bipunctiphorus
- Species: B. dissipata

Binomial name
- Bipunctiphorus dissipata (Yano, 1963)

Synonyms
- Stenoptilia dissipata Yano, 1963

Species of plume moth

Bipunctiphorus dissipata is a moth of the family Pterophoridae. It is found in the Honshu and Kyushu islands of Japan.

The length of the forewings is 7–10 mm.
