= Marasmarcha bonaespei =

Scientific classification
- Kingdom: Animalia
- Phylum: Arthropoda
- Class: Insecta
- Order: Lepidoptera
- Family: Pterophoridae
- Genus: Marasmarcha
- Species: M. bonaespei

Binomial name
- Marasmarcha bonaespei (Walsingham, 1881)

Synonyms
- Lioptilus bonaespei Walsingham, 1881; Pterophorus verax Meyrick, 1909; Marasmarcha verax (Meyrick, 1909)

Species of plume moth

Marasmarcha bonaespei is a moth of the family Pterophoridae. It is known from Namibia and South Africa.
