= Platyptilia dschambiya =

Scientific classification
- Kingdom: Animalia
- Phylum: Arthropoda
- Clade: Pancrustacea
- Class: Insecta
- Order: Lepidoptera
- Family: Pterophoridae
- Genus: Platyptilia
- Species: P. dschambiya

Binomial name
- Platyptilia dschambiya Arenberger, 1999

Species of plume moth

Platyptilia dschambiya is a moth of the family Pterophoridae. It is known from Yemen and China.

The wingspan is about 23 mm.
