= Platyptilia calamicola =

Scientific classification
- Kingdom: Animalia
- Phylum: Arthropoda
- Clade: Pancrustacea
- Class: Insecta
- Order: Lepidoptera
- Family: Pterophoridae
- Genus: Platyptilia
- Species: P. calamicola

Binomial name
- Platyptilia calamicola Meyrick, 1937

Species of plume moth

Platyptilia calamicola is a moth of the family Pterophoridae. It is found in Java, Indonesia.
