= Marasmarcha rhypodactylus =

Scientific classification
- Domain: Eukaryota
- Kingdom: Animalia
- Phylum: Arthropoda
- Class: Insecta
- Order: Lepidoptera
- Family: Pterophoridae
- Genus: Marasmarcha
- Species: M. rhypodactylus

Binomial name
- Marasmarcha rhypodactylus (Staudinger, 1870)

Synonyms
- Pterophorus rhypodactylus Staudinger, 1871; Pterophorus terrenus Meyrick, 1936; Marasmarcha rhypodactyla

Species of plume moth

Marasmarcha rhypodactylus is a moth of the family Pterophoridae. It is found in Russia, Turkey, Lebanon, Kazakhstan, Iraq and Iran.

The wingspan is 24–27 mm.
