= Marasmarcha fauna =

Scientific classification
- Domain: Eukaryota
- Kingdom: Animalia
- Phylum: Arthropoda
- Class: Insecta
- Order: Lepidoptera
- Family: Pterophoridae
- Genus: Marasmarcha
- Species: M. fauna

Binomial name
- Marasmarcha fauna (Milliere, 1876)

Synonyms
- Mimaeseoptilus fauna Millière, 1871

Species of plume moth

Marasmarcha fauna is a moth of the family Pterophoridae. It is found in France and Italy. It has recently been recorded from Spain.

The larvae feed on spiny restharrow (Ononis spinosa).
