= Platyptilia strictiformis =

Scientific classification
- Kingdom: Animalia
- Phylum: Arthropoda
- Clade: Pancrustacea
- Class: Insecta
- Order: Lepidoptera
- Family: Pterophoridae
- Genus: Platyptilia
- Species: P. strictiformis

Binomial name
- Platyptilia strictiformis Meyrick, 1932

Synonyms
- Platyptilia spiculivalva Gielis, 1990

Species of plume moth

Platyptilia strictiformis is a moth of the family Pterophoridae. It is known from the Democratic Republic of Congo, Tanzania and Uganda.
