= Platyptilia albifimbriata =

Scientific classification
- Kingdom: Animalia
- Phylum: Arthropoda
- Clade: Pancrustacea
- Class: Insecta
- Order: Lepidoptera
- Family: Pterophoridae
- Genus: Platyptilia
- Species: P. albifimbriata

Binomial name
- Platyptilia albifimbriata Arenberger, 2002

Species of plume moth

Platyptilia albifimbriata is a moth of the family Pterophoridae. It is found in Yemen and China.

The wingspan is about 17 millimetres (0.67 in).
