= Platyptilia fulva =

Scientific classification
- Kingdom: Animalia
- Phylum: Arthropoda
- Clade: Pancrustacea
- Class: Insecta
- Order: Lepidoptera
- Family: Pterophoridae
- Genus: Platyptilia
- Species: P. fulva

Binomial name
- Platyptilia fulva Bigot, 1964

Species of plume moth

Platyptilia fulva is a moth of the family Pterophoridae. It is known from La Réunion, Madagascar and Mauritius.

The larvae feed on Cosmos species and Emilia citrina.
