= Marasmarcha brevirostris =

Scientific classification
- Domain: Eukaryota
- Kingdom: Animalia
- Phylum: Arthropoda
- Class: Insecta
- Order: Lepidoptera
- Family: Pterophoridae
- Genus: Marasmarcha
- Species: M. brevirostris

Binomial name
- Marasmarcha brevirostris (Walsingham, 1915)

Synonyms
- Platyptilia brevirostris Walsingham, 1915

Species of plume moth

Marasmarcha brevirostris is a species of moth in the genus Marasmarcha known from Guatemala, Mexico, and Panama. Moths of this species take flight in February and August and have a wingspan of approximately 20–25 millimetres.
