= Platyptilia euridactyla =

Scientific classification
- Kingdom: Animalia
- Phylum: Arthropoda
- Clade: Pancrustacea
- Class: Insecta
- Order: Lepidoptera
- Family: Pterophoridae
- Genus: Platyptilia
- Species: P. euridactyla

Binomial name
- Platyptilia euridactyla Zagulajev & Filippova, 1976

Synonyms
- Platyptilia manchurica Buszko, 1977

Species of plume moth

Platyptilia euridactyla is a moth of the family Pterophoridae. It is found in Russia and China (Manchuria).
