= Platyptilia sochivkoi =

Scientific classification
- Kingdom: Animalia
- Phylum: Arthropoda
- Clade: Pancrustacea
- Class: Insecta
- Order: Lepidoptera
- Family: Pterophoridae
- Genus: Platyptilia
- Species: P. sochivkoi

Binomial name
- Platyptilia sochivkoi Kovtunovich & Ustjuzhanin, 2011

Species of plume moth

Platyptilia sochivkoi is a moth of the family Pterophoridae. It is found in Lesotho.
