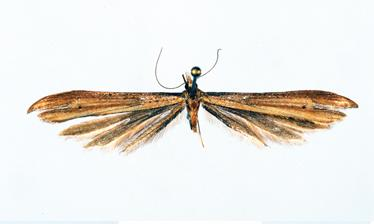

Scientific classification
- Kingdom: Animalia
- Phylum: Arthropoda
- Clade: Pancrustacea
- Class: Insecta
- Order: Lepidoptera
- Family: Pterophoridae
- Genus: Platyptilia
- Species: P. aarviki

Binomial name
- Platyptilia aarviki Gielis, 2008

= Platyptilia aarviki =

Species of plume moth

Platyptilia aarviki is a moth of the family Pterophoroidea. It is found in Kenya. The species is named after Leif Aarvik, in honour of his thorough work on the Microlepidoptera of Tanzania.

The wingspan is about 33 mm. The moth flies in November.
