= Marasmarcha lydia =

Scientific classification
- Kingdom: Animalia
- Phylum: Arthropoda
- Class: Insecta
- Order: Lepidoptera
- Family: Pterophoridae
- Genus: Marasmarcha
- Species: M. lydia

Binomial name
- Marasmarcha lydia Ustjuzhanin, 1996

Species of plume moth

Marasmarcha lydia is a moth of the family Pterophoridae. It is found in Russia (Buryatia), Mongolia. and Tajikistan. The habitat consists of piedmont steppenfield meadows.

Adults are on wing in July.

The larvae probably feed on legumes.
