= Platyptilia violacea =

Scientific classification
- Kingdom: Animalia
- Phylum: Arthropoda
- Clade: Pancrustacea
- Class: Insecta
- Order: Lepidoptera
- Family: Pterophoridae
- Genus: Platyptilia
- Species: P. violacea

Binomial name
- Platyptilia violacea Gibeaux, 1994

Species of plume moth

Platyptilia violacea is a moth of the family Pterophoridae. It is known from Madagascar.
