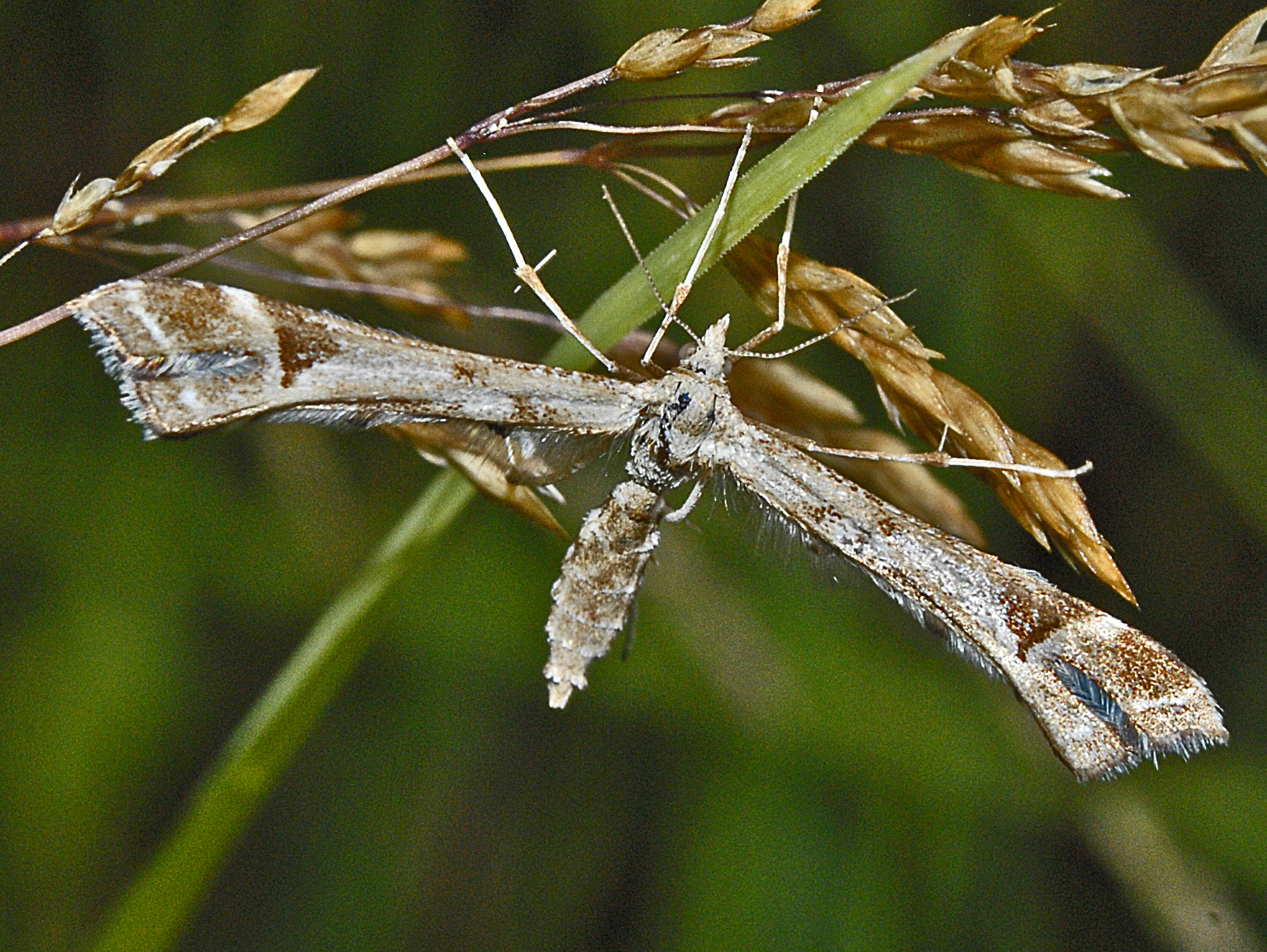

Scientific classification
- Kingdom: Animalia
- Phylum: Arthropoda
- Clade: Pancrustacea
- Class: Insecta
- Order: Lepidoptera
- Family: Pterophoridae
- Genus: Platyptilia
- Species: P. thiosoma

Binomial name
- Platyptilia thiosoma Meyrick, 1920

= Platyptilia thiosoma =

Species of plume moth

Platyptilia thiosoma is a moth of the family Pterophoridae. It is known from Kenya.
