= Platyptilia profunda =

Scientific classification
- Kingdom: Animalia
- Phylum: Arthropoda
- Clade: Pancrustacea
- Class: Insecta
- Order: Lepidoptera
- Family: Pterophoridae
- Genus: Platyptilia
- Species: P. profunda

Binomial name
- Platyptilia profunda Yano, 1963

Species of plume moth

Platyptilia profunda is a moth of the family Pterophoridae. It is known from Honshu island of Japan.

The length of the forewings is 11–14 mm.

The larvae feed on Senecio nemorensis.
