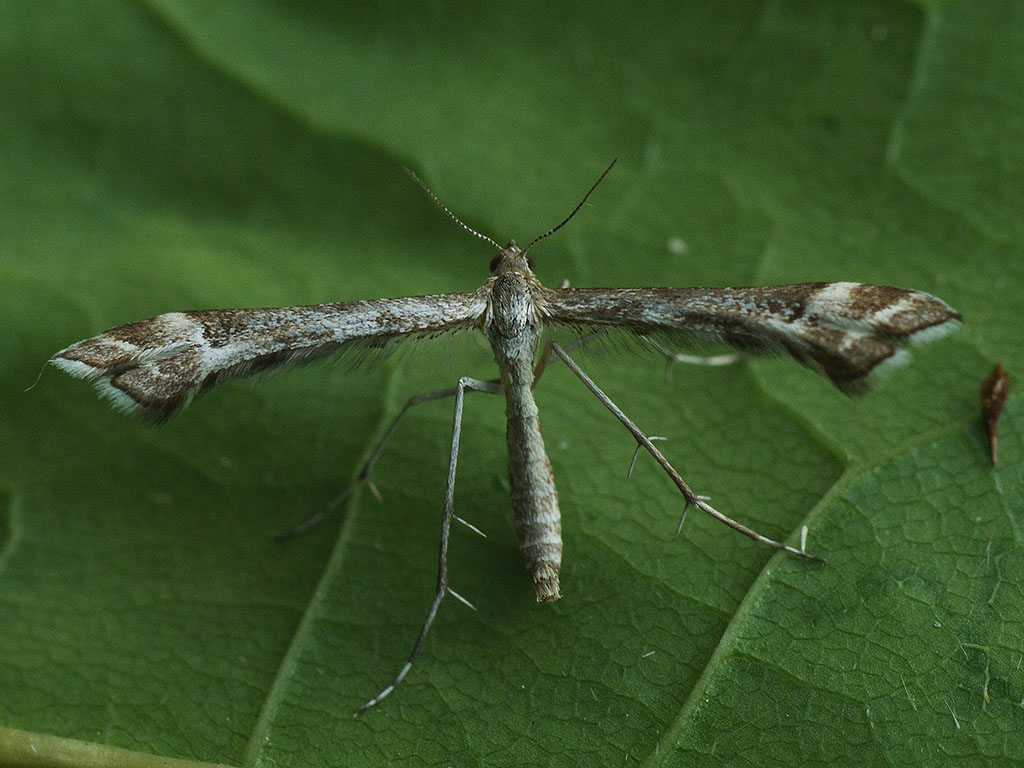

Scientific classification
- Kingdom: Animalia
- Phylum: Arthropoda
- Class: Insecta
- Order: Lepidoptera
- Family: Pterophoridae
- Genus: Platyptilia
- Species: P. tesseradactyla

Binomial name
- Platyptilia tesseradactyla (Linnaeus, 1761)

Synonyms
- Phalaena Alucita tesseradactyla Linnaeus, 1761; Pterophorus fischeri Zeller, 1841; Platyptilia hibemica Tutt, 1906

= Platyptilia tesseradactyla =

Species of plume moth

Platyptilia tesseradactyla is a moth of the family Pterophoridae found in the Palearctic, (including Europe) and North America. It was first described by the Swedish taxonomist, Carl Linnaeus in 1761.

== Description ==
The wingspan is 17–20 mm. Diagnostic is a thin black streak at the front edge of the front wings at the costal triangle. In the male genitalia, the valves are significantly pointed. The arms of the anellus are short and not split. In the females, the sclerotized segments of the antrum are one and a half times as long as wide. The tissue areas of the lamina postvaginalis are large and about as long as the antrum.

== Biology ==
Single brooded flying in May and June, they live in discrete colonies and are easily disturbed during the day. They also fly in the evening. Their habitat is limestone grassland and pavements. and, in continental Europe, mountainous areas with pine forests and sandy soils.

Larvae feed internally in the stems of their food plant, where it also hibernates. In the following spring larvae feed externally, spinning shoots together and feeding on the new growth. Food plants include mountain everlasting (Antennaria dioica), cudweeds (Gnaphalium species) and dwarf everlast (Helichrysum arenarium).

== Distribution ==
Found in northern and central Europe, east to Russia. In Norway it is found up to 70° northern latitude. It is also found in the United States and Canada and has been recorded from Iran. In Ireland it was first found in County Galway, but is largely restricted to The Burren region of County Clare.
