= Platyptilia gandaki =

Scientific classification
- Kingdom: Animalia
- Phylum: Arthropoda
- Clade: Pancrustacea
- Class: Insecta
- Order: Lepidoptera
- Family: Pterophoridae
- Genus: Platyptilia
- Species: P. gandaki

Binomial name
- Platyptilia gandaki Gielis, 1999

Species of plume moth

Platyptilia gandaki is a moth of the family Pterophoridae. It is found in China.

The wingspan is 21–22 mm.
