= Platyptilia montana =

Scientific classification
- Kingdom: Animalia
- Phylum: Arthropoda
- Clade: Pancrustacea
- Class: Insecta
- Order: Lepidoptera
- Family: Pterophoridae
- Genus: Platyptilia
- Species: P. montana

Binomial name
- Platyptilia montana Yano, 1963

Species of plume moth

Platyptilia montana is a moth of the family Pterophoridae. It is known from Honshu island, Japan.

The length of the forewings is 10–11 mm.
