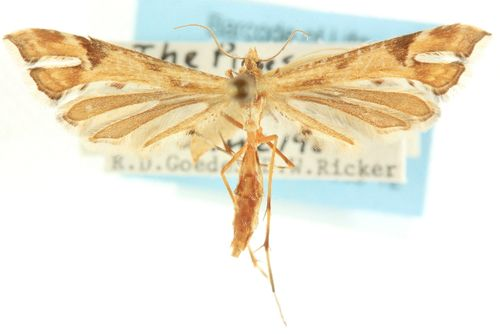

Scientific classification
- Kingdom: Animalia
- Phylum: Arthropoda
- Clade: Pancrustacea
- Class: Insecta
- Order: Lepidoptera
- Family: Pterophoridae
- Genus: Platyptilia
- Species: P. percnodactylus

Binomial name
- Platyptilia percnodactylus Walsingham, 1880

Synonyms
- Platyptilia percnodactyla

= Platyptilia percnodactylus =

Species of plume moth

Platyptilia percnodactylus is a moth of the family Pterophoridae. It is found in North America (including California and Alberta).

The wingspan is about 22 mm. The head and thorax are pale brown. The antennae are spotted on the upper side with white and brown. The abdomen is brownish, although paler at the base. The legs are whitish, slender, slightly enlarged and tinged with brownish at the end of the segments. The forewings are pale brown with much paler blotches and a pale brownish streak crossing the wing, parallel to the outer margin. There is also a brown line at the base of the fringes, which are mostly brown. The hindwings are brown.
