= Platyptilia sabius =

Scientific classification
- Kingdom: Animalia
- Phylum: Arthropoda
- Clade: Pancrustacea
- Class: Insecta
- Order: Lepidoptera
- Family: Pterophoridae
- Genus: Platyptilia
- Species: P. sabius

Binomial name
- Platyptilia sabius (Felder & Rogenhofer, 1875)

Synonyms
- Mimaeseoptilus sabius Felder & Rogenhofer, 1875; Amblyptilus africae Walsingham, 1881

Species of plume moth

Platyptilia sabius is a moth of the family Pterophoridae. It is known from the Democratic Republic of Congo, Ethiopia, South Africa and Tanzania.
