= Marasmarcha samarcandica =

Scientific classification
- Kingdom: Animalia
- Phylum: Arthropoda
- Class: Insecta
- Order: Lepidoptera
- Family: Pterophoridae
- Genus: Marasmarcha
- Species: M. samarcandica

Binomial name
- Marasmarcha samarcandica Gerasimov, 1930

Species of plume moth

Marasmarcha samarcandica is a moth of the family Pterophoridae. It is known from Russia and Kazakhstan. Its habitat is chalk and desert steppes and semideserts.

== Appearance ==
Marasmarcha samarcandica has a lightened, whitish central area on the forewings.

== Original description ==
Gerasimov, Aleksey Maksimovich (1930). "Zur Lepidopteren-Fauna Mittel-Asiens I. Microheterocera aus dem Distrikt Kaschka-Darja (SO-Buchara)". Ежегодник Зоологического музея Академии наук СССР – Annuaire du musée zoologique de l'académie des sciences de l'URSS. 31.
