= Platyptilia duneraensis =

Scientific classification
- Kingdom: Animalia
- Phylum: Arthropoda
- Clade: Pancrustacea
- Class: Insecta
- Order: Lepidoptera
- Family: Pterophoridae
- Genus: Platyptilia
- Species: P. duneraensis

Binomial name
- Platyptilia duneraensis Rose and Pooni, 2003

Species of plume moth

Platyptilia duneraensis is a moth of the family Pterophoridae. It is found in India.
