= Platyptilia daemonica =

Scientific classification
- Kingdom: Animalia
- Phylum: Arthropoda
- Clade: Pancrustacea
- Class: Insecta
- Order: Lepidoptera
- Family: Pterophoridae
- Genus: Platyptilia
- Species: P. daemonica

Binomial name
- Platyptilia daemonica Meyrick, 1932

Species of plume moth

Platyptilia daemonica is a moth of the family Pterophoridae. It is known from Ethiopia.
