= Platyptilia citropleura =

Scientific classification
- Kingdom: Animalia
- Phylum: Arthropoda
- Clade: Pancrustacea
- Class: Insecta
- Order: Lepidoptera
- Family: Pterophoridae
- Genus: Platyptilia
- Species: P. citropleura

Binomial name
- Platyptilia citropleura Meyrick, 1908

Species of plume moth

Platyptilia citropleura is a moth of the family Pterophoridae. It is found in Taiwan, India and Sri Lanka.

The larvae feed on Begonia species. They feed inside the seed-capsules of their host plant. Full-grown larvae have a pale yellow head without any markings. The other segments are creamy-yellow or pale greenish-yellow with a narrow pale ferruginous median line and a broader pale ferruginous lateral line. Pupation takes place in a dull pale yellow pupa. It is attached to the outside of a seed-capsule of the host plant.
