= Platyptilia ignifera =

Scientific classification
- Kingdom: Animalia
- Phylum: Arthropoda
- Clade: Pancrustacea
- Class: Insecta
- Order: Lepidoptera
- Family: Pterophoridae
- Genus: Platyptilia
- Species: P. ignifera

Binomial name
- Platyptilia ignifera Meyrick, 1908

Species of plume moth

Platyptilia ignifera is a moth of the family Pterophoridae. It is known from Japan (Honshu, Kyushu, Tsushima) and India.

The length of the forewings is 9–10 mm.

The larvae feed on the fruit of Vitis vinifera.
