= Marasmarcha pulcher =

Scientific classification
- Domain: Eukaryota
- Kingdom: Animalia
- Phylum: Arthropoda
- Class: Insecta
- Order: Lepidoptera
- Family: Pterophoridae
- Genus: Marasmarcha
- Species: M. pulcher

Binomial name
- Marasmarcha pulcher (Christoph, 1885)

Synonyms
- Mimaeseoptilus pulcher Christoph, 1885; Marasmarcha pulchra; Marasmarcha uralski Bang-Haas, 1913 (nomen nudum)

Species of plume moth

Marasmarcha pulcher is a moth of the family Pterophoridae. It is found in Turkmenistan, Kazakhstan, Iran and Afghanistan.

The wingspan is 20–22 mm.
