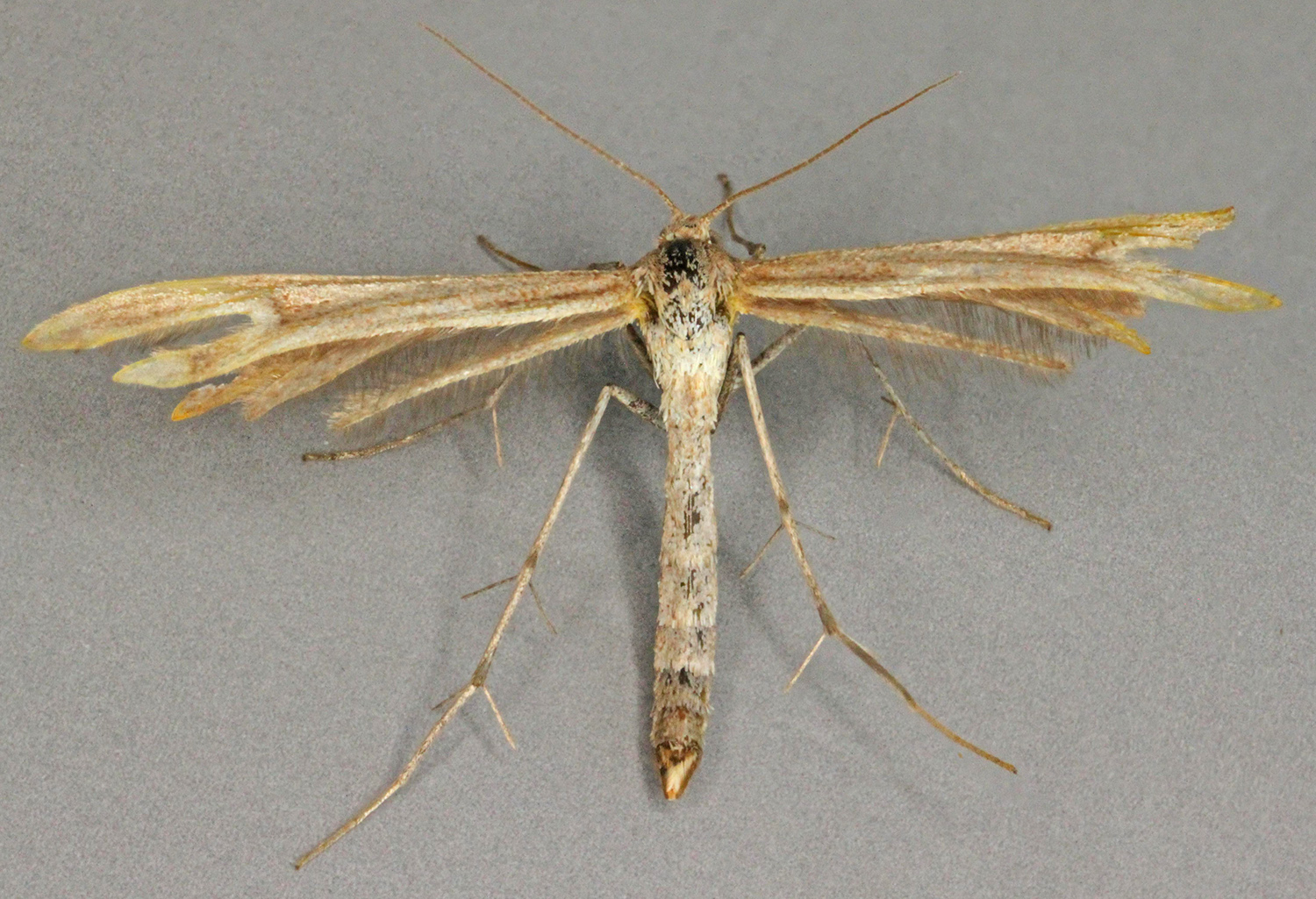

Scientific classification
- Kingdom: Animalia
- Phylum: Arthropoda
- Clade: Pancrustacea
- Class: Insecta
- Order: Lepidoptera
- Family: Pterophoridae
- Genus: Marasmarcha
- Species: M. lunaedactyla

Binomial name
- Marasmarcha lunaedactyla (Haworth, 1811)

Synonyms
- List: Alucita lunaedactyla Haworth, 1811; Alucita phaeodactyla Hübner, 1813; Pterophorus agrorum Herrich-Schäffer, 1855; Marasmarcha altaica Krulikowski, 1906; Marasmarcha agrorum var. tuttodactyla Chapman, 1906

= Marasmarcha lunaedactyla =

Species of plume moth

Marasmarcha lunaedactyla, also known as the crescent plume, is a moth of the family Pterophoridae found in most of Europe. It was first described by Adrian Hardy Haworth in 1811.

== Description ==
The wingspan is 18–22 mm.

== Distribution ==
The crescent plume is found in most of Europe, except Ireland and most of the Balkan Peninsula.
