= Platyptilia washburnensis =

Scientific classification
- Kingdom: Animalia
- Phylum: Arthropoda
- Clade: Pancrustacea
- Class: Insecta
- Order: Lepidoptera
- Family: Pterophoridae
- Genus: Platyptilia
- Species: P. washburnensis

Binomial name
- Platyptilia washburnensis McDunnough, 1929

Species of plume moth

Platyptilia washburnensis is a moth of the family Pterophoridae.

== Distribution ==
It is found in North America.
