= Marasmarcha ehrenbergianus =

Scientific classification
- Kingdom: Animalia
- Phylum: Arthropoda
- Clade: Pancrustacea
- Class: Insecta
- Order: Lepidoptera
- Family: Pterophoridae
- Genus: Marasmarcha
- Species: M. ehrenbergianus

Binomial name
- Marasmarcha ehrenbergianus (Zeller, 1841)

Synonyms
- Pterophorus ehrenbergianus Zeller, 1841; Pterophorus decolorum Caradja, 1920

Species of plume moth

Marasmarcha ehrenbergianus is a moth of the family Pterophoridae. It is found in Turkey, Syria, Lebanon, Russia and Iran.
