= Platyptilia rhyncholoba =

Scientific classification
- Kingdom: Animalia
- Phylum: Arthropoda
- Clade: Pancrustacea
- Class: Insecta
- Order: Lepidoptera
- Family: Pterophoridae
- Genus: Platyptilia
- Species: P. rhyncholoba

Binomial name
- Platyptilia rhyncholoba Meyrick, 1924

Species of plume moth

Platyptilia rhyncholoba is a moth of the family Pterophoridae. It is known from the Democratic Republic of Congo, Kenya, Rwanda, Tanzania and Uganda.
