= Platyptilia suigensis =

Scientific classification
- Kingdom: Animalia
- Phylum: Arthropoda
- Clade: Pancrustacea
- Class: Insecta
- Order: Lepidoptera
- Family: Pterophoridae
- Genus: Platyptilia
- Species: P. suigensis

Binomial name
- Platyptilia suigensis Matsumura, 1931

Species of plume moth

Platyptilia suigensis is a moth of the family Pterophoridae. It is found in Japan and Korea.
