= Platyptilia phanerozona =

Scientific classification
- Kingdom: Animalia
- Phylum: Arthropoda
- Clade: Pancrustacea
- Class: Insecta
- Order: Lepidoptera
- Family: Pterophoridae
- Genus: Platyptilia
- Species: P. phanerozona

Binomial name
- Platyptilia phanerozona Diakonoff, 1952

Species of plume moth

Platyptilia phanerozona is a moth of the family Pterophoridae. It is known from New Guinea.
