= Platyptilia onias =

Scientific classification
- Kingdom: Animalia
- Phylum: Arthropoda
- Clade: Pancrustacea
- Class: Insecta
- Order: Lepidoptera
- Family: Pterophoridae
- Genus: Platyptilia
- Species: P. onias

Binomial name
- Platyptilia onias Meyrick, 1916

Species of plume moth

Platyptilia onias is a moth of the family Pterophoridae. It is known from Peru.

The wingspan is about 18 mm. Adults are on wing in August.
