= Platyptilia enargota =

Scientific classification
- Kingdom: Animalia
- Phylum: Arthropoda
- Clade: Pancrustacea
- Class: Insecta
- Order: Lepidoptera
- Family: Pterophoridae
- Genus: Platyptilia
- Species: P. enargota

Binomial name
- Platyptilia enargota Durrant, 1915

Species of plume moth

Platyptilia enargota is a moth of the family Pterophoridae. It is known from Borneo and New Guinea.
