= Platyptilia superscandens =

Scientific classification
- Kingdom: Animalia
- Phylum: Arthropoda
- Clade: Pancrustacea
- Class: Insecta
- Order: Lepidoptera
- Family: Pterophoridae
- Genus: Platyptilia
- Species: P. superscandens

Binomial name
- Platyptilia superscandens T. B. Fletcher, 1940

Species of plume moth

Platyptilia superscandens is a moth of the family Pterophoridae. It was described by Thomas Bainbrigge Fletcher in 1940 and it is found in India.
