= Platyptilia censoria =

Scientific classification
- Kingdom: Animalia
- Phylum: Arthropoda
- Clade: Pancrustacea
- Class: Insecta
- Order: Lepidoptera
- Family: Pterophoridae
- Genus: Platyptilia
- Species: P. censoria

Binomial name
- Platyptilia censoria Meyrick, 1910

Species of plume moth

Platyptilia censoria is a moth of the family Pterophoridae. It is known from Mauritius in the Indian Ocean.
