= Platyptilia spicula =

Scientific classification
- Kingdom: Animalia
- Phylum: Arthropoda
- Clade: Pancrustacea
- Class: Insecta
- Order: Lepidoptera
- Family: Pterophoridae
- Genus: Platyptilia
- Species: P. spicula

Binomial name
- Platyptilia spicula Gielis, 2006

Species of plume moth

Platyptilia spicula is a moth of the family Pterophoridae. It is known from Suriname.

The wingspan is about 22 mm. Adults are on wing in May.
