= Platyptilia molopias =

Scientific classification
- Kingdom: Animalia
- Phylum: Arthropoda
- Clade: Pancrustacea
- Class: Insecta
- Order: Lepidoptera
- Family: Pterophoridae
- Genus: Platyptilia
- Species: P. molopias

Binomial name
- Platyptilia molopias Meyrick, 1906

Synonyms
- Platyptilia petila Yano, 1963

Species of plume moth

Platyptilia molopias is a moth of the family Pterophoridae. It has a very wide distribution in the Old World tropics, ranging from Africa through India and Sri Lanka, east to Indonesia. It is also found in the Philippines on Luzon, Mindoro, Negros and Mindanao.

The wingspan is about 15 mm.

The larvae feed on the flowers and unripe seeds of Teucrium tomentosum. The larvae are generally very pale green, but may vary in colour, and some examples might be described as reddish with a greenish latero-dorsal suffusion on the abdominal segments. The head is yellowish or pale green. Pupation takes place in a pale flesh-pink pupa which is suspended freely by the tail from an empty flower-sheath of the host plant.

== Taxonomy ==
Some authors consider it to be a synonym of Platyptilia farfarellus.
