= Platyptilia pseudofulva =

Scientific classification
- Kingdom: Animalia
- Phylum: Arthropoda
- Clade: Pancrustacea
- Class: Insecta
- Order: Lepidoptera
- Family: Pterophoridae
- Genus: Platyptilia
- Species: P. pseudofulva

Binomial name
- Platyptilia pseudofulva Gibeaux, 1994

Species of plume moth

Platyptilia pseudofulva is a moth of the family Pterophoridae. It is known from Madagascar.

This species has a wingspan of 18 millimetres (0.71 in).
