= Platyptilia interpres =

Scientific classification
- Kingdom: Animalia
- Phylum: Arthropoda
- Clade: Pancrustacea
- Class: Insecta
- Order: Lepidoptera
- Family: Pterophoridae
- Genus: Platyptilia
- Species: P. interpres

Binomial name
- Platyptilia interpres Meyrick, 1922

Species of plume moth

Platyptilia interpres is a moth of the family Pterophoridae. It is known from Uganda.
