= Bipunctiphorus dimorpha =

Scientific classification
- Domain: Eukaryota
- Kingdom: Animalia
- Phylum: Arthropoda
- Class: Insecta
- Order: Lepidoptera
- Family: Pterophoridae
- Genus: Bipunctiphorus
- Species: B. dimorpha

Binomial name
- Bipunctiphorus dimorpha (T. B. Fletcher, 1910)

Synonyms
- Platyptilia dimorpha T. B. Fletcher, 1910; Platyptilia patriarcha Meyrick, 1912; Bipunctiphorus etiennei Gibeaux, 1994

Species of plume moth

Bipunctiphorus dimorpha is a moth of the family Pterophoridae. The species was first described by Thomas Bainbrigge Fletcher in 1910. It is known from the Seychelles, Sierra Leone, South Africa, Kenya, Réunion, Madagascar and Tanzania. It has also been recorded from China.

The wingspan is about 18 mm.
