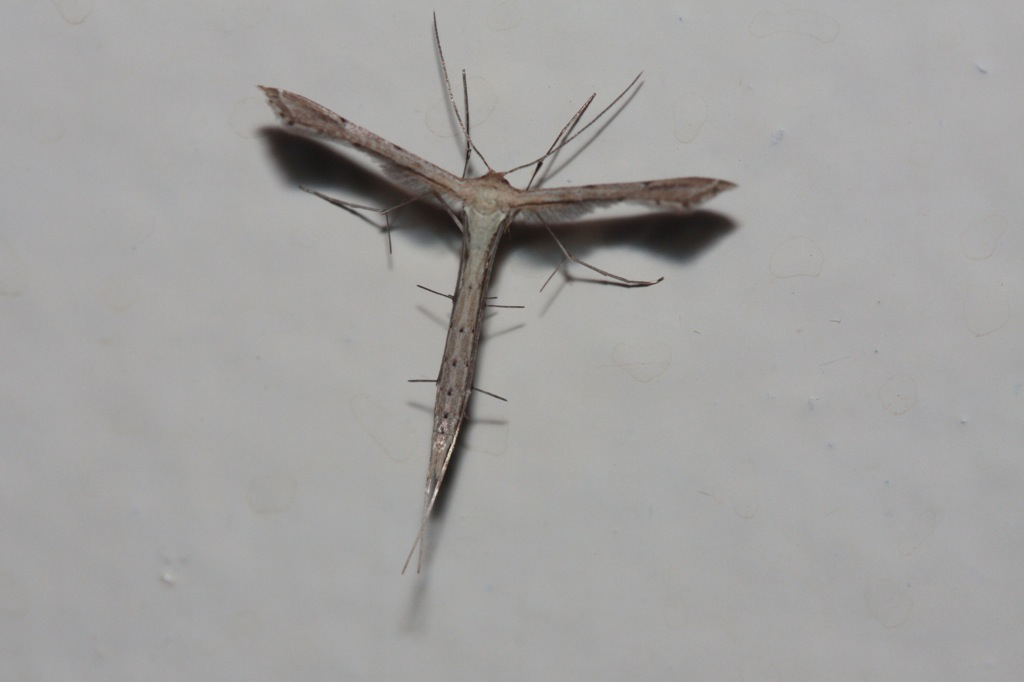

Scientific classification
- Domain: Eukaryota
- Kingdom: Animalia
- Phylum: Arthropoda
- Class: Insecta
- Order: Lepidoptera
- Family: Pterophoridae
- Genus: Bipunctiphorus
- Species: B. euctimena

Binomial name
- Bipunctiphorus euctimena (Turner, 1913)

Synonyms
- Platyptilia euctimena Turner, 1913

= Bipunctiphorus euctimena =

Species of plume moth

Bipunctiphorus euctimena is a moth of the family Pterophoridae. It is found in Australia, where it is known from Brisbane, Kuranda and Toowoomba.
