= Marasmarcha corniculata =

Scientific classification
- Kingdom: Animalia
- Phylum: Arthropoda
- Class: Insecta
- Order: Lepidoptera
- Family: Pterophoridae
- Genus: Marasmarcha
- Species: M. corniculata

Binomial name
- Marasmarcha corniculata (Meyrick, 1913)

Synonyms
- Platyptilia corniculata Meyrick, 1913

Species of plume moth

Marasmarcha corniculata is a moth of the family Pterophoridae. It is known from South Africa.
