= Marasmarcha empedota =

Scientific classification
- Kingdom: Animalia
- Phylum: Arthropoda
- Class: Insecta
- Order: Lepidoptera
- Family: Pterophoridae
- Genus: Marasmarcha
- Species: M. empedota

Binomial name
- Marasmarcha empedota (Meyrick, 1908)

Synonyms
- Platyptilia empedota Meyrick, 1908

Species of plume moth

Marasmarcha empedota is a moth of the family Pterophoridae. It is known from South Africa.
