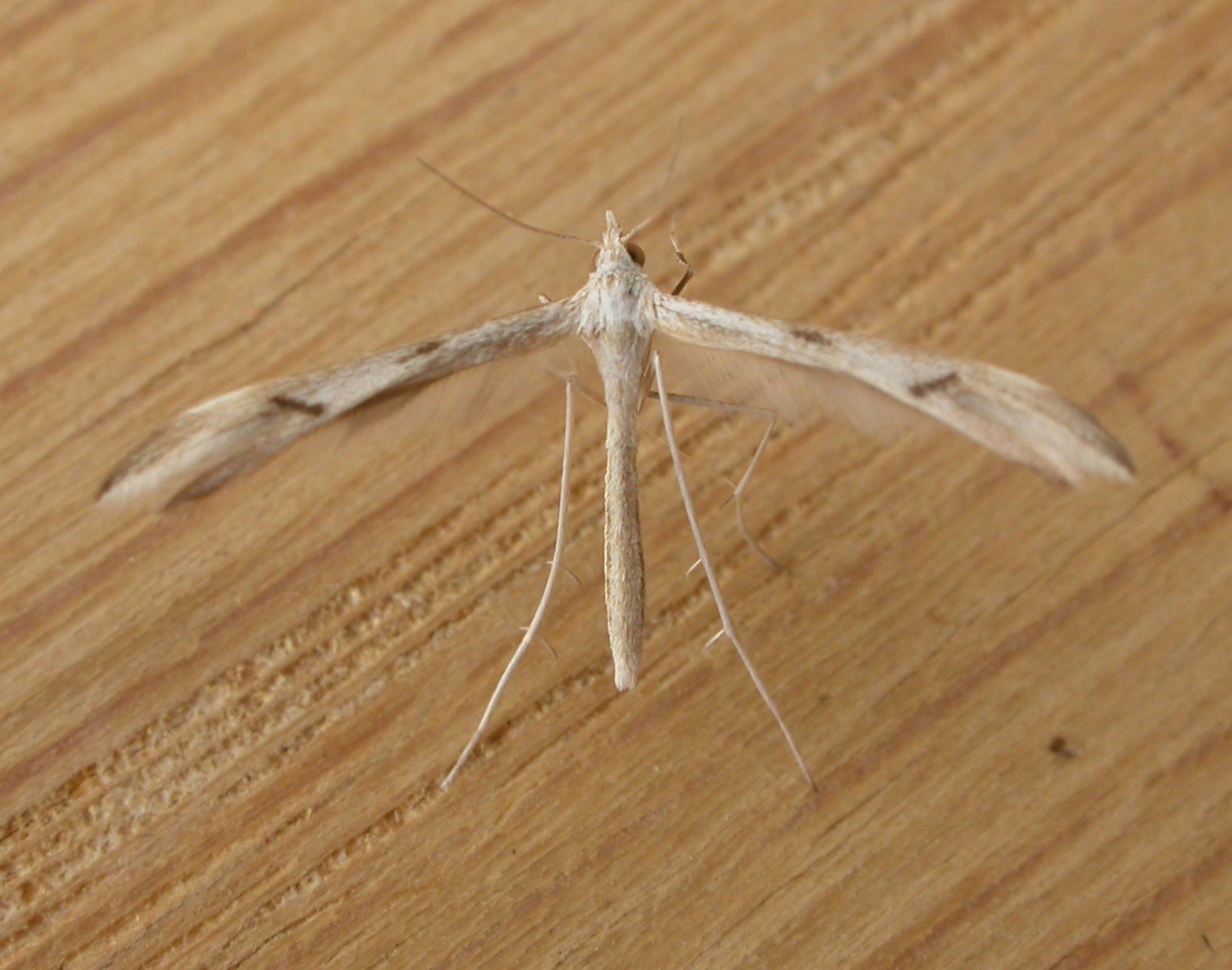

Scientific classification
- Kingdom: Animalia
- Phylum: Arthropoda
- Clade: Pancrustacea
- Class: Insecta
- Order: Lepidoptera
- Family: Pterophoridae
- Genus: Platyptilia
- Species: P. celidotus

Binomial name
- Platyptilia celidotus (Meyrick, 1885)

Synonyms
- Lioptilus celidotus Meyrick, 1885; Stenoptilia celidota (Meyrick, 1885); Platyptilia celidota (Meyrick, 1885)

= Platyptilia celidotus =

Species of plume moth

Platyptilia celidotus is a species of moth in the family Pterophoroidea. This species was described by Edward Meyrick in 1885 and named Lioptilus celidotus. It has been found in both New Zealand and Australia.
