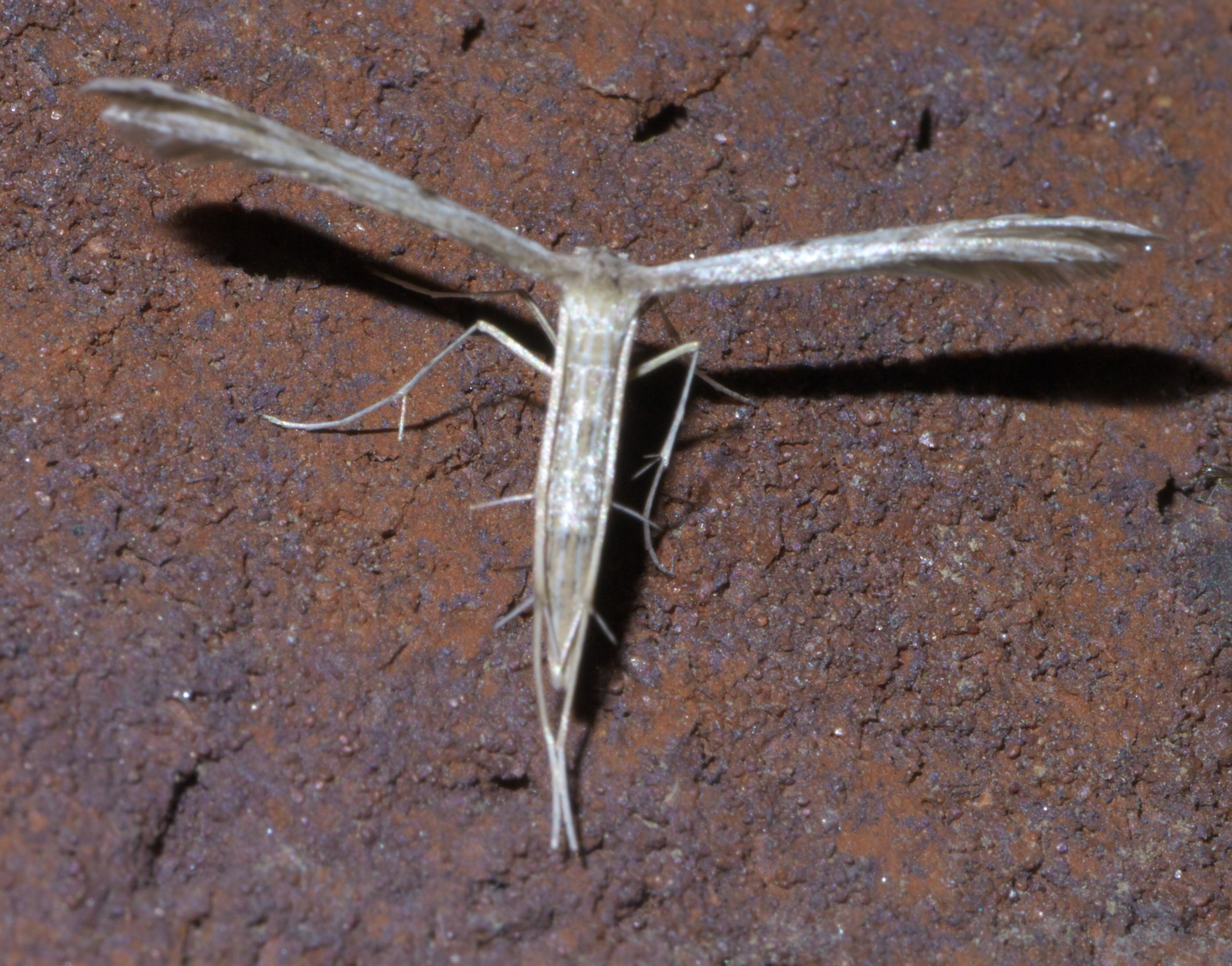

Scientific classification
- Kingdom: Animalia
- Phylum: Arthropoda
- Class: Insecta
- Order: Lepidoptera
- Family: Pterophoridae
- Genus: Pselnophorus
- Species: P. belfragei

Binomial name
- Pselnophorus belfragei (Fish, 1881)

Synonyms
- Aciptilus belfragei Fish, 1881

= Pselnophorus belfragei =

Species of plume moth

Pselnophorus belfragei (Belfrage's plume moth) is a moth of the family Pterophoridae. It is found in the south-eastern United States, from South Carolina to Florida, west to Texas and Oklahoma.

The wingspan is about 14 millimetres (0.55 in). They are on wing year round.

The larvae feed on the leaves of Dichondra caroliniensis.

== Etymology ==
It is named for Gustav Wilhelm Belfrage.
