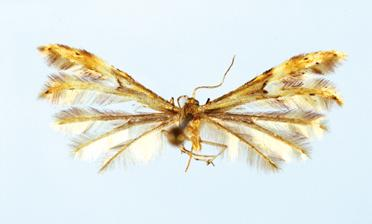
- Pselnophorus jaechi

Scientific classification
- Kingdom: Animalia
- Phylum: Arthropoda
- Class: Insecta
- Order: Lepidoptera
- Family: Pterophoridae
- Subfamily: Pterophorinae
- Tribe: Oidaematophorini
- Genus: Pselnophorus; Wallengren, 1881

Species
- See text

Synonyms
- Crasimetis Meyrick, 1890

= Pselnophorus =

Plume moth genus

Pselnophorus is a genus of moths in the plume moth family, Pterophoridae. They are native to the Northern Hemisphere and southern Africa. As of 2014 the genus contains eighteen species.

Species include:

- Pselnophorus albitarsella (Walsingham, 1900)
- Pselnophorus belfragei (Fish, 1881)
- Pselnophorus brevispinus S.L.Hao & H.H.Li, 2008
- Pselnophorus chihuahuaensis Matthews, Gielis, and Watkins, 2014
- Pselnophorus ducis Gibeaux, 1994
- Pselnophorus emeishanensis Arenberger, 2002
- Pselnophorus heterodactyla (Müller, 1764)
- Pselnophorus hodgesi Matthews, Gielis, and Watkins, 2014
- Pselnophorus jaechi Arenberger, 1993
- Pselnophorus japonicus Marumo, 1923
- Pselnophorus kutisi Matthews, Gielis, and Watkins, 2014
- Pselnophorus laudatus Bigot, 1964
- Pselnophorus pachyceros Meyrick, 1921
- Pselnophorus poggei (Mann, 1862)
- Pselnophorus vilis (Butler, 1881)
- Pselnophorus zulu Ustjuzhanin et Kovtunovich, 2010
