= Pselnophorus ducis =

Scientific classification
- Kingdom: Animalia
- Phylum: Arthropoda
- Class: Insecta
- Order: Lepidoptera
- Family: Pterophoridae
- Genus: Pselnophorus
- Species: P. ducis

Binomial name
- Pselnophorus ducis Gibeaux, 1994

Species of plume moth

Pselnophorus ducis is a moth of the family Pterophoridae that is known from Madagascar.
