= Peploglyptus =

Scientific classification
- Kingdom: Animalia
- Phylum: Arthropoda
- Clade: Pancrustacea
- Class: Insecta
- Order: Coleoptera
- Suborder: Polyphaga
- Infraorder: Staphyliniformia
- Family: Histeridae
- Subfamily: Onthophilinae
- Genus: Peploglyptus; J. L. LeConte, 1880

Genus of beetles

Peploglyptus is a genus of clown beetles in the family Histeridae. There are at least three described species in Peploglyptus.

== Species ==
These three species belong to the genus Peploglyptus:

- Peploglyptus belfragei J. L. LeConte, 1880
- Peploglyptus golbachi Kanaar, 1981
- Peploglyptus mulu Caterino, 2005
