= Pselnophorus vilis =

Scientific classification
- Kingdom: Animalia
- Phylum: Arthropoda
- Class: Insecta
- Order: Lepidoptera
- Family: Pterophoridae
- Genus: Pselnophorus
- Species: P. vilis

Binomial name
- Pselnophorus vilis (Butler, 1881)

Synonyms
- Aciptilus vilis Butler, 1881; Aciptilia amurensis Christoph, 1882

Species of plume moth

Pselnophorus vilis is a moth of the family Pterophoridae. It known from Japan (Hokkaido, Honshu, Kyushu, Tanega-shima, Yaku-shima), Amur, Korea and China.

The wingspan is 14–17 millimetres (0.55–0.67 in) and the length of the forewings is 9–11 millimetres (0.35–0.43 in).

The larvae feed on Ligularia fisheri, Ligularia tussilaginea and Petasites japonicus.
