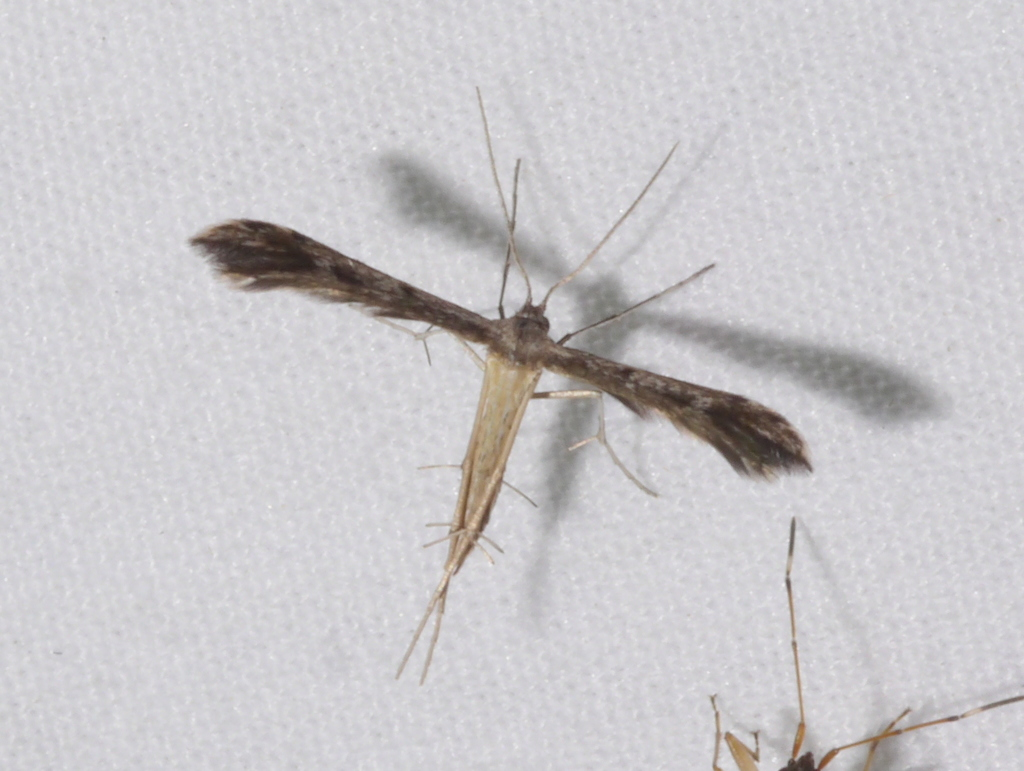

Scientific classification
- Kingdom: Animalia
- Phylum: Arthropoda
- Class: Insecta
- Order: Lepidoptera
- Family: Pterophoridae
- Genus: Pselnophorus
- Species: P. kutisi

Binomial name
- Pselnophorus kutisi Matthews, Gielis, & Watkins, 2014

= Pselnophorus kutisi =

Species of plume moth

Pselnophorus kutisi is a moth of the family Pterophoridae. It is found in the United States, where it has been recorded from Texas and Florida.

The wingspan is about 5.91 millimetres (0.233 in).
