= Pselnophorus chihuahuaensis =

Scientific classification
- Kingdom: Animalia
- Phylum: Arthropoda
- Class: Insecta
- Order: Lepidoptera
- Family: Pterophoridae
- Genus: Pselnophorus
- Species: P. chihuahuaensis

Binomial name
- Pselnophorus chihuahuaensis Matthews, Gielis, and Watkins, 2014

Species of plume moth

Pselnophorus chihuahuaensis is a moth of the family Pterophoridae. It is found in North America, where it has been recorded from western Texas, Arizona and the intermediary desert regions of Mexico.

The wingspan is 8.44 millimetres (0.332 in) for males and 7.61 millimetres (0.300 in) for females.
