= Peploglyptus belfragei =

Scientific classification
- Kingdom: Animalia
- Phylum: Arthropoda
- Clade: Pancrustacea
- Class: Insecta
- Order: Coleoptera
- Suborder: Polyphaga
- Infraorder: Staphyliniformia
- Family: Histeridae
- Genus: Peploglyptus
- Species: P. belfragei

Binomial name
- Peploglyptus belfragei J. L. LeConte, 1880

Species of beetle

Peploglyptus belfragei is a species of clown beetle in the family Histeridae. It is found in North America. It is named after Gustav Wilhelm Belfrage who collected the type specimen.
