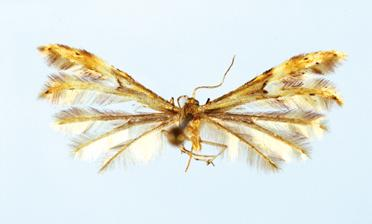

Scientific classification
- Kingdom: Animalia
- Phylum: Arthropoda
- Class: Insecta
- Order: Lepidoptera
- Family: Pterophoridae
- Genus: Pselnophorus
- Species: P. jaechi

Binomial name
- Pselnophorus jaechi (Arenberger, 1993)

Synonyms
- Pterophorus jaechi Arenberger, 1993; Pselnophorus meruensis Gielis, 2008

= Pselnophorus jaechi =

Species of plume moth

Pselnophorus jaechi is a moth of the family Pterophoridae. It is found locally around Mount Meru in Tanzania.

The wingspan is 15–17 millimetres (0.59–0.67 in). The moth flies in February, July and December.
