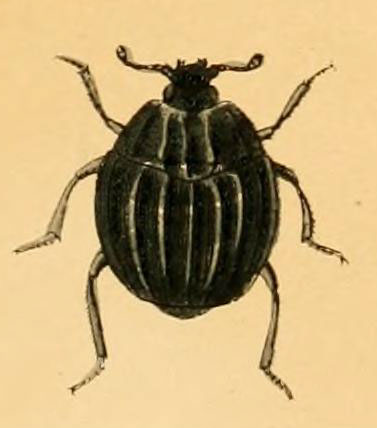
- Onthophilus punctatus

Scientific classification
- Kingdom: Animalia
- Phylum: Arthropoda
- Class: Insecta
- Order: Coleoptera
- Suborder: Polyphaga
- Infraorder: Staphyliniformia
- Family: Histeridae
- Subfamily: Onthophilinae; MacLeay, 1819

= Onthophilinae =

Onthophilinae Temporal range: Cenomanian–Recent

Subfamily of beetles

Onthophilinae is a subfamily of clown beetles in the family Histeridae. There are about 8 genera and at least 80 described species in Onthophilinae.

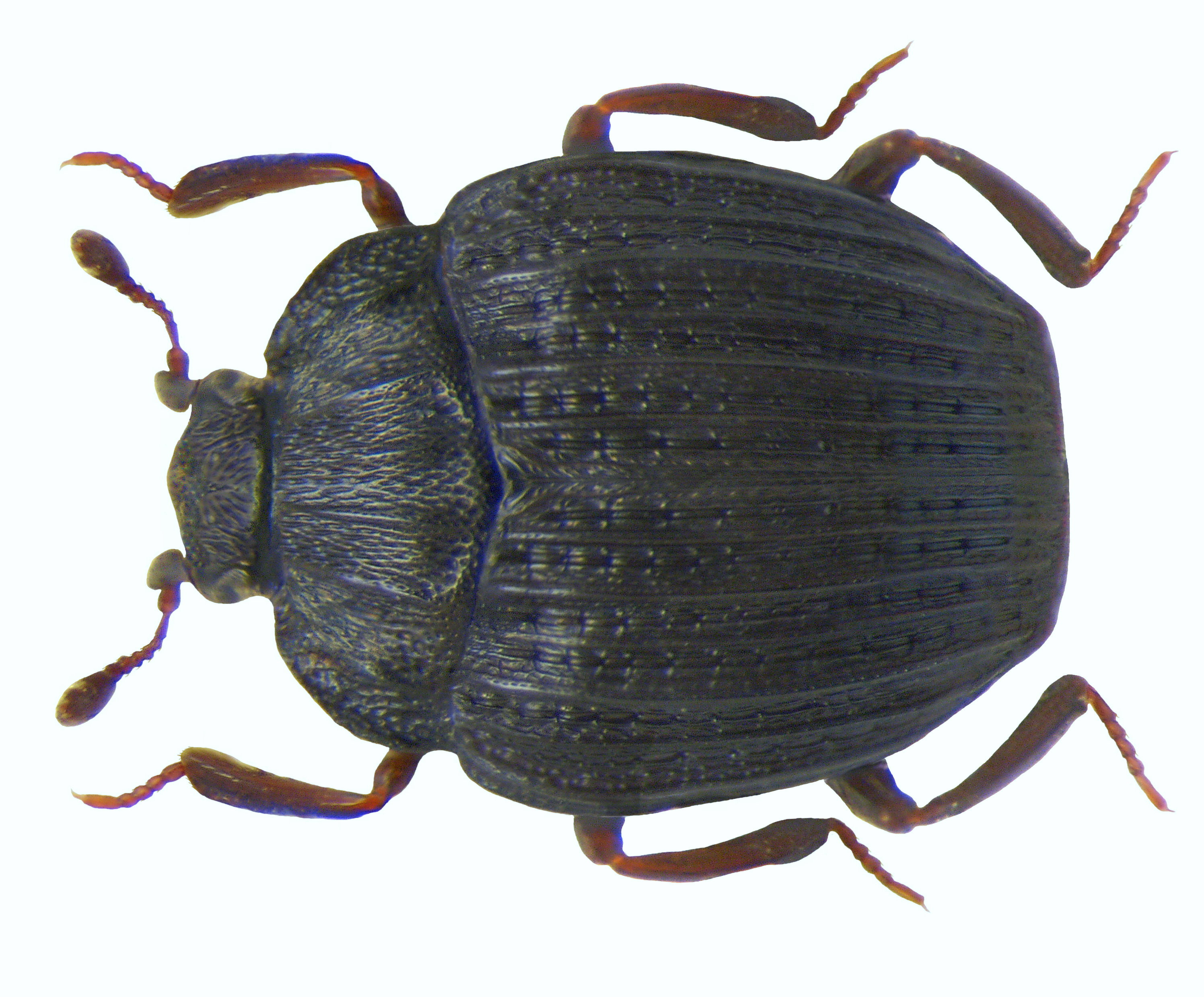
Onthophilus striatus

== Genera ==
These eight genera belong to the subfamily Onthophilinae:

- Cretonthophilus Caterino, Wolf-Schwenninger and Bechly, 2015 (Cretaceous (Early Cenomanian); Myanmar)
- Epiechinus Lewis, 1891
- Glymma Marseul, 1856
- Onthophilus Leach, 1817
- Peploglyptus J. L. LeConte, 1880
- Sculptura Thérond, 1969
- Sigillum Thérond, 1975
- Vuattuoxinus Thérond, 1964
