= Pselnophorus emeishanensis =

Scientific classification
- Kingdom: Animalia
- Phylum: Arthropoda
- Class: Insecta
- Order: Lepidoptera
- Family: Pterophoridae
- Genus: Pselnophorus
- Species: P. emeishanensis

Binomial name
- Pselnophorus emeishanensis Arenberger, 2002

Species of plume moth

Pselnophorus emeishanensis is a moth of the family Pterophoridae that is found in Sichuan province of China.
