= Pselnophorus pachyceros =

Scientific classification
- Kingdom: Animalia
- Phylum: Arthropoda
- Class: Insecta
- Order: Lepidoptera
- Family: Pterophoridae
- Genus: Pselnophorus
- Species: P. pachyceros

Binomial name
- Pselnophorus pachyceros Meyrick, 1921

Species of plume moth

Pselnophorus pachyceros is a moth of the family Pterophoridae that is known from Mozambique and South Africa.
