= Onthophilus intermixtus =

Scientific classification
- Kingdom: Animalia
- Phylum: Arthropoda
- Class: Insecta
- Order: Coleoptera
- Suborder: Polyphaga
- Infraorder: Staphyliniformia
- Family: Histeridae
- Genus: Onthophilus
- Species: O. intermixtus

Binomial name
- Onthophilus intermixtus Helava, 1978

Species of beetle

Onthophilus intermixtus is a species of clown beetle in the family Histeridae. It is found in North America.
