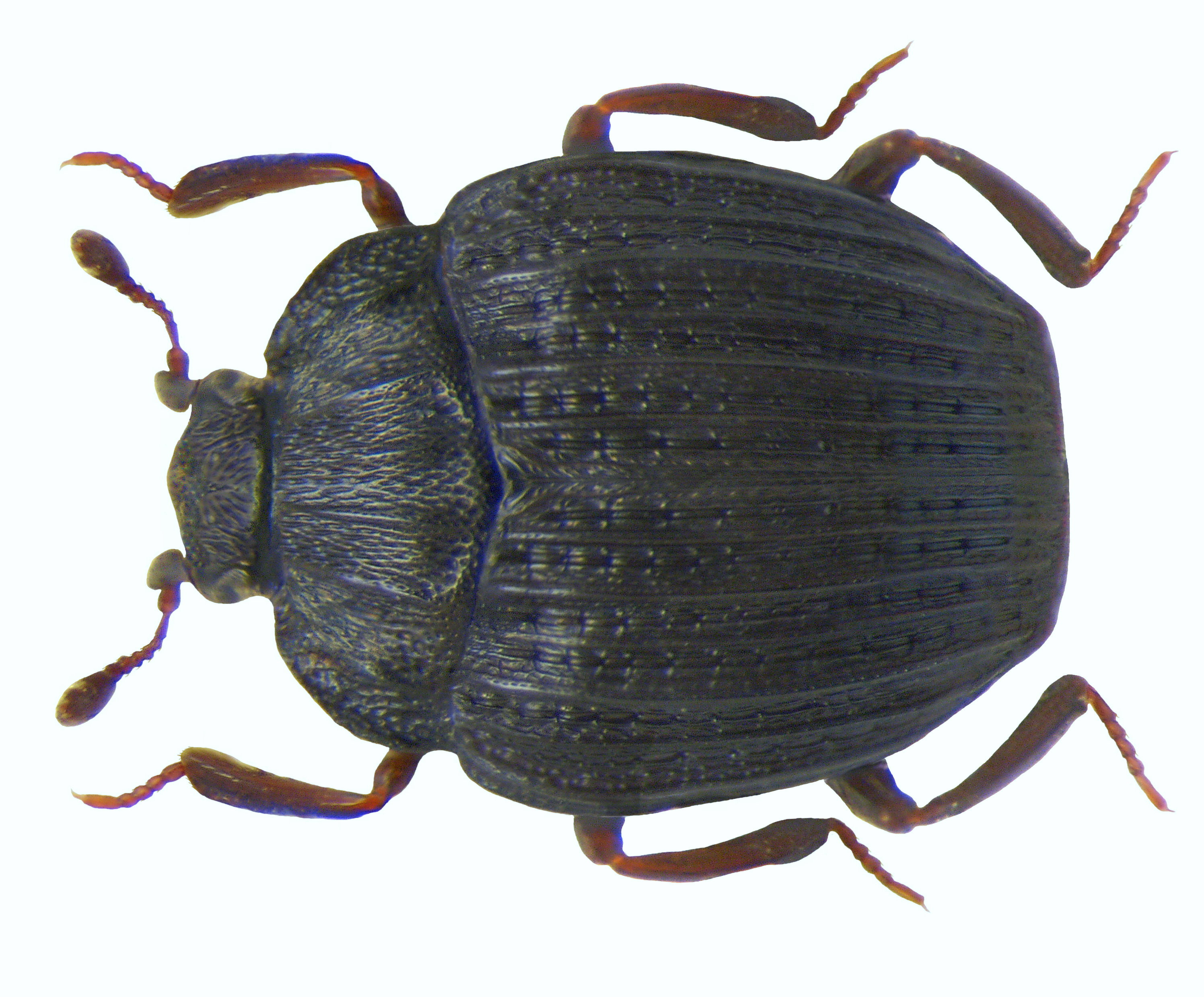
- Onthophilus striatus

Scientific classification
- Kingdom: Animalia
- Phylum: Arthropoda
- Class: Insecta
- Order: Coleoptera
- Suborder: Polyphaga
- Infraorder: Staphyliniformia
- Family: Histeridae
- Subfamily: Onthophilinae
- Genus: Onthophilus; Leach, 1817

= Onthophilus =

Onthophilus Temporal range: Cenomanian–Recent

Genus of beetles

Onthophilus is a genus of clown beetles in the family Histeridae. There are more than 40 described species in Onthophilus. Fossils of the genus have been discovered in Burmese amber, estimated to be 100 million years old.

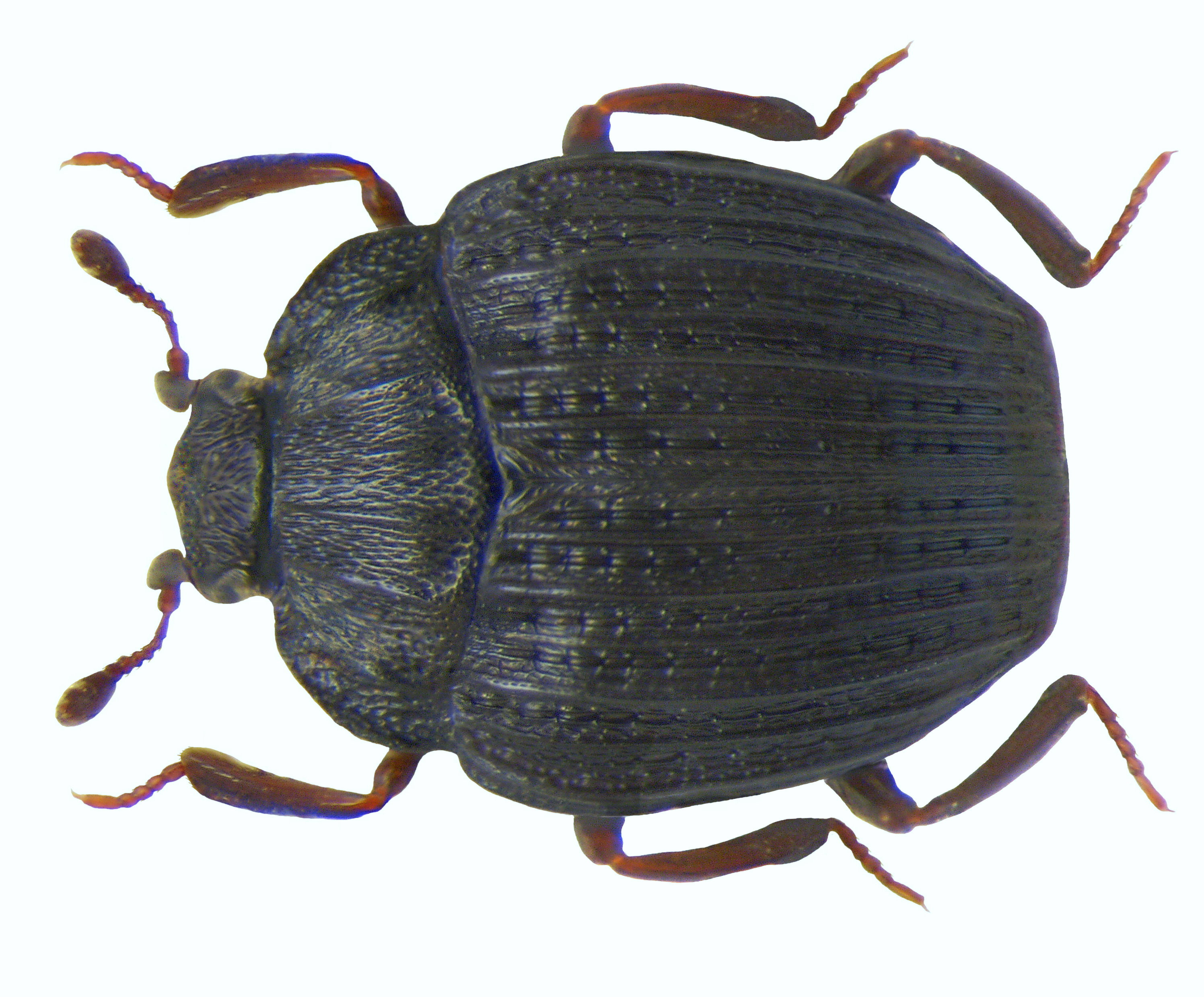
Onthophilus striatus

== Species ==
These 41 species belong to the genus Onthophilus:

- Onthophilus affinis Redtenbacher, 1849
- Onthophilus alternatus (Say, 1825)
- Onthophilus aonoi Ôhara & Nakane, 1986
- Onthophilus australis Helawa & Howden, 1977
- Onthophilus bickhardti Reitter, 1909
- Onthophilus convictor Normand, 1919
- Onthophilus cynomysi Helava, 1978
- Onthophilus deflectus Helava, 1978
- Onthophilus extraordinarius Reichardt, 1941
- Onthophilus flavicornis Lewis, 1884
- Onthophilus flohri Lewis, 1888
- Onthophilus foveipennis Lewis, 1885
- Onthophilus giganteus Helava, 1978
- Onthophilus globulosus (Olivier, 1789)
- Onthophilus heilogjiangensis Ji Lingke, 1993
- Onthophilus intermedius Handschin, 1944
- Onthophilus intermixtus Helava, 1978
- Onthophilus irregularis Howden & Laplante, 2003
- Onthophilus jakli Kapler, 1993
- Onthophilus julii Lewis, 1892
- Onthophilus kamiyai Adachi, 1930
- Onthophilus kirni Ross, 1944
- Onthophilus lecontei Horn, 1870
- Onthophilus lijiangensis Zhou & Lou, 2002
- Onthophilus melampus Reichardt, 1933
- Onthophilus niponensis Lewis, 1907
- Onthophilus nodatus J. E. LeConte, 1844
- Onthophilus ordinarius Lewis, 1879
- Onthophilus ostreatus Lewis, 1879
- Onthophilus pluricostatus J. E. LeConte, 1844
- Onthophilus punctatus (O. F. Müller, 1776)
- Onthophilus reyesi Kryzhanovskij, 1992
- Onthophilus rugatus Therond
- Onthophilus sculptilis Lewis, 1892
- Onthophilus silvae Lewis, 1884
- Onthophilus smetanai Mazur, 1994
- Onthophilus soltaui Casey, 1893
- Onthophilus striatus (Forster, 1771)
- Onthophilus thomomysi Helava, 1978
- Onthophilus tuberculatus Lewis, 1892
- Onthophilus wenzeli Helava, 1978
