= Onthophilus kirni =

Scientific classification
- Kingdom: Animalia
- Phylum: Arthropoda
- Class: Insecta
- Order: Coleoptera
- Suborder: Polyphaga
- Infraorder: Staphyliniformia
- Family: Histeridae
- Genus: Onthophilus
- Species: O. kirni

Binomial name
- Onthophilus kirni Ross, 1944

Species of beetle

Onthophilus kirni is a species of clown beetle in the family Histeridae. It is found in North America.
