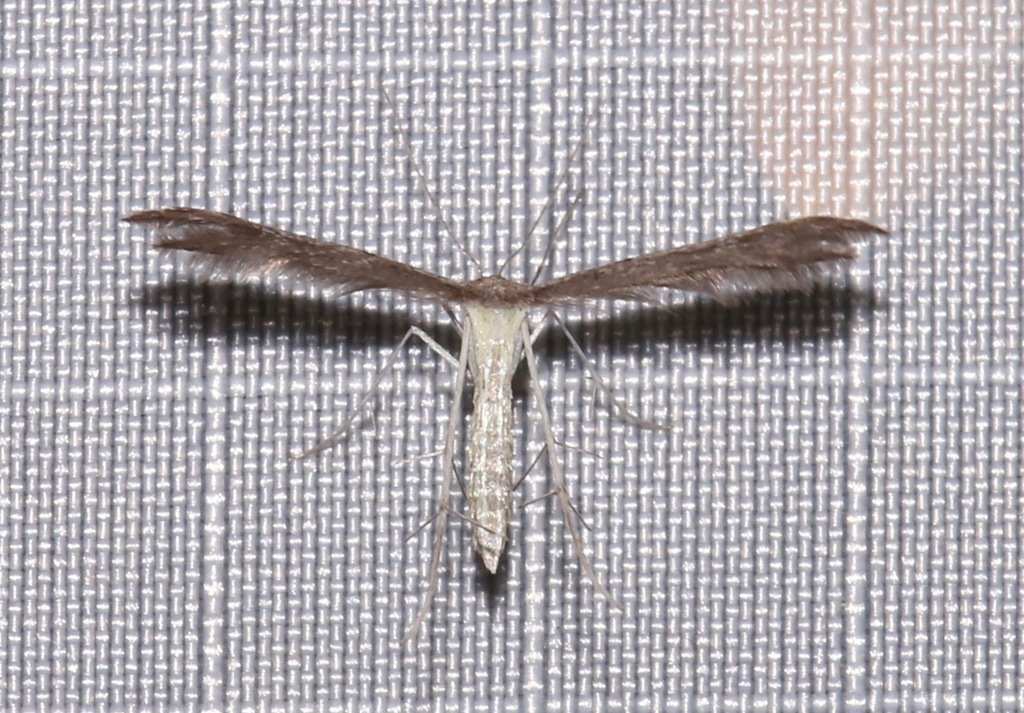

Scientific classification
- Kingdom: Animalia
- Phylum: Arthropoda
- Class: Insecta
- Order: Lepidoptera
- Family: Pterophoridae
- Genus: Pselnophorus
- Species: P. hodgesi

Binomial name
- Pselnophorus hodgesi Matthews, Gielis, and Watkins, 2014

= Pselnophorus hodgesi =

Species of plume moth

Pselnophorus hodgesi is a moth of the family Pterophoridae. It is found in the United States, where it has been recorded from southern Arizona and southern Texas.

The wingspan is about 7 millimetres (0.28 in) for males and about 7.5 millimetres (0.30 in) for females. Adults are on wing from the end of June to mid-October, probably in multiple generations per year.
