= Gustav Wilhelm Belfrage =

American entomologist

- Born: 1834
- Died: 1882 (aged 47–48)

Gustav Wilhelm Belfrage (12 December 1834 – 7 December 1882) was an American insect collector. He was born in Stockholm, Sweden, but travelled to the United States in 1860 where he settled in Bosque County, Texas.

== Biography ==
Belfrage was born in Stockholm, the son of a captain in the Svea Life Guards, Axel Ake who later became a chamberlain to Charles XIV John, and Baroness Margareta Sofia Leijonhufvud. His grandfather Johan Leonard Belfrage had been a major general in the army. It is thought that his father lost much of his wealth and estate and after a divorce in 1849. An older brother Axel Leonard was likely favoured by his father. In 1854, Gustav went to study forestry at the Royal College in Stockholm but left without completing the degree to work on the estate of Stjarnsund as a forester. He then worked in several other places and became an alcoholic. He also began to collect insects and correspond with other entomologists. In 1859 he wrote to Carl Henrik Boheman that he planned to leave to the United States of America. He sent specimens to Boheman and was caught in the crisis created by the Civil War. He sold off many of his collections in order to obtain food. written out of an inheritance. In 1866 he travelled across the US and collected insect specimens. He travelled along Lake Michigan, Lake Superior, visited the Swedish settlement in Altona, Illinois and began to correspond with American entomologists such as Ezra Townsend Cresson. He worked for some time in Waco, Texas as a clerk for Swedish merchant Samuel Johan Forsgard. He also sold specimens to collectors and scientists all over the world. Many species were first described based on specimens he collected. Scientists sometimes named these newly described species after him, such as the moth Caloptilia belfragella and the beetle Peploglyptus belfragei. In 1869 Belfrage went to Bosque County, Texas and began to study the insects of McLennan County. He received some money after the death of his mother in 1867. He also earned some money from his insect sales. He also appears to have tried out insect control measures and patented a formula to control cotton bollworms. He later lived in an upper floor room of house owned by Carl Questad in Norse, Texas he later moved to a small cabin on a farm belonging to Chris Pederson. He lived here until his death. At the time of his death he had 36,881 pinned specimens. No portrait has been found of him. People remembered that he was a slender, six foot and three inches tall, blond and blue eyed. He was said to have been pleasant but kept to himself and had few friends. His estate was appraised in his probate to value $491.40. His insect collection was purchased by the US National Museum. He was buried in a unmarked grave but in 1943, several entomological groups in Texas recognized his contributions and placed a marker on his grave.
