= Pselnophorus brevispinus =

Scientific classification
- Kingdom: Animalia
- Phylum: Arthropoda
- Class: Insecta
- Order: Lepidoptera
- Family: Pterophoridae
- Genus: Pselnophorus
- Species: P. brevispinus

Binomial name
- Pselnophorus brevispinus S.L.Hao & H.H.Li, 2008

Species of plume moth

Pselnophorus brevispinus is a moth of the family Pterophoridae that is endemic to China.
