= Pselnophorus albitarsella =

Scientific classification
- Kingdom: Animalia
- Phylum: Arthropoda
- Class: Insecta
- Order: Lepidoptera
- Family: Pterophoridae
- Genus: Pselnophorus
- Species: P. albitarsella

Binomial name
- Pselnophorus albitarsella (Walsingham, 1900)

Synonyms
- Alucita albitarsella Walsingham, 1900; Pselnophorus albitarsellus

Species of plume moth

Pselnophorus albitarsella is a moth of the family Pterophoridae that is found in India.

The larvae are white with a few long hairs scattered about the body. They burrow into the shoots of a common jungle plant. Pupation takes place in a pupa which is suspended by the tail from the underside of a leaf.
