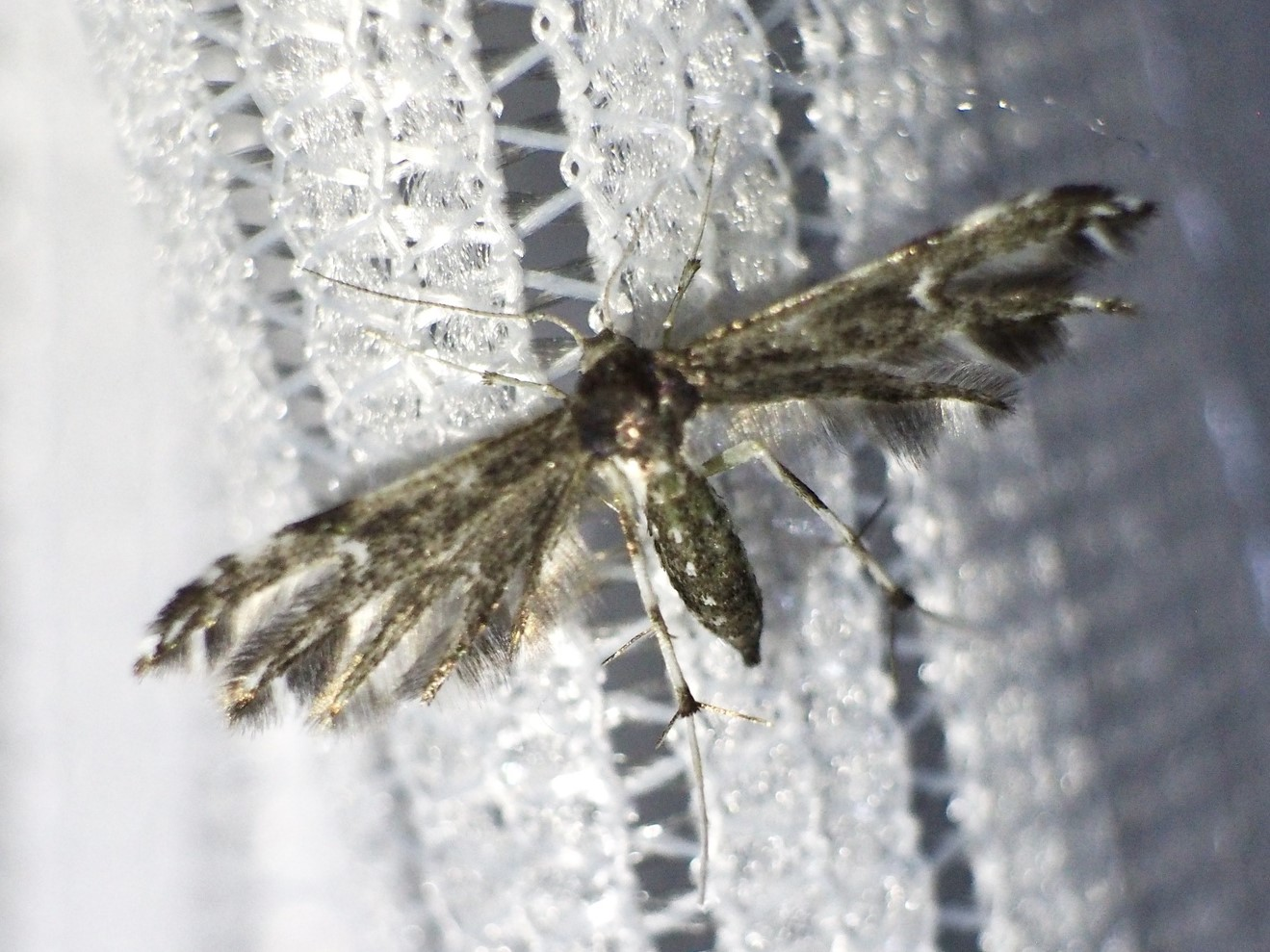

Scientific classification
- Kingdom: Animalia
- Phylum: Arthropoda
- Class: Insecta
- Order: Lepidoptera
- Family: Pterophoridae
- Genus: Pselnophorus
- Species: P. japonicus

Binomial name
- Pselnophorus japonicus Marumo, 1923

Synonyms
- Stenoptilia hirayama Matsumura, 1931

= Pselnophorus japonicus =

Species of plume moth

Pselnophorus japonicus is a species of moth in the family Pterophoridae. It is known from Honshu, Shikoku, Kyushu, Tsushima, Tanega-shima, and Yakushima in Japan.

The length of the forewings is 8–9 millimetres (0.31–0.35 in).
