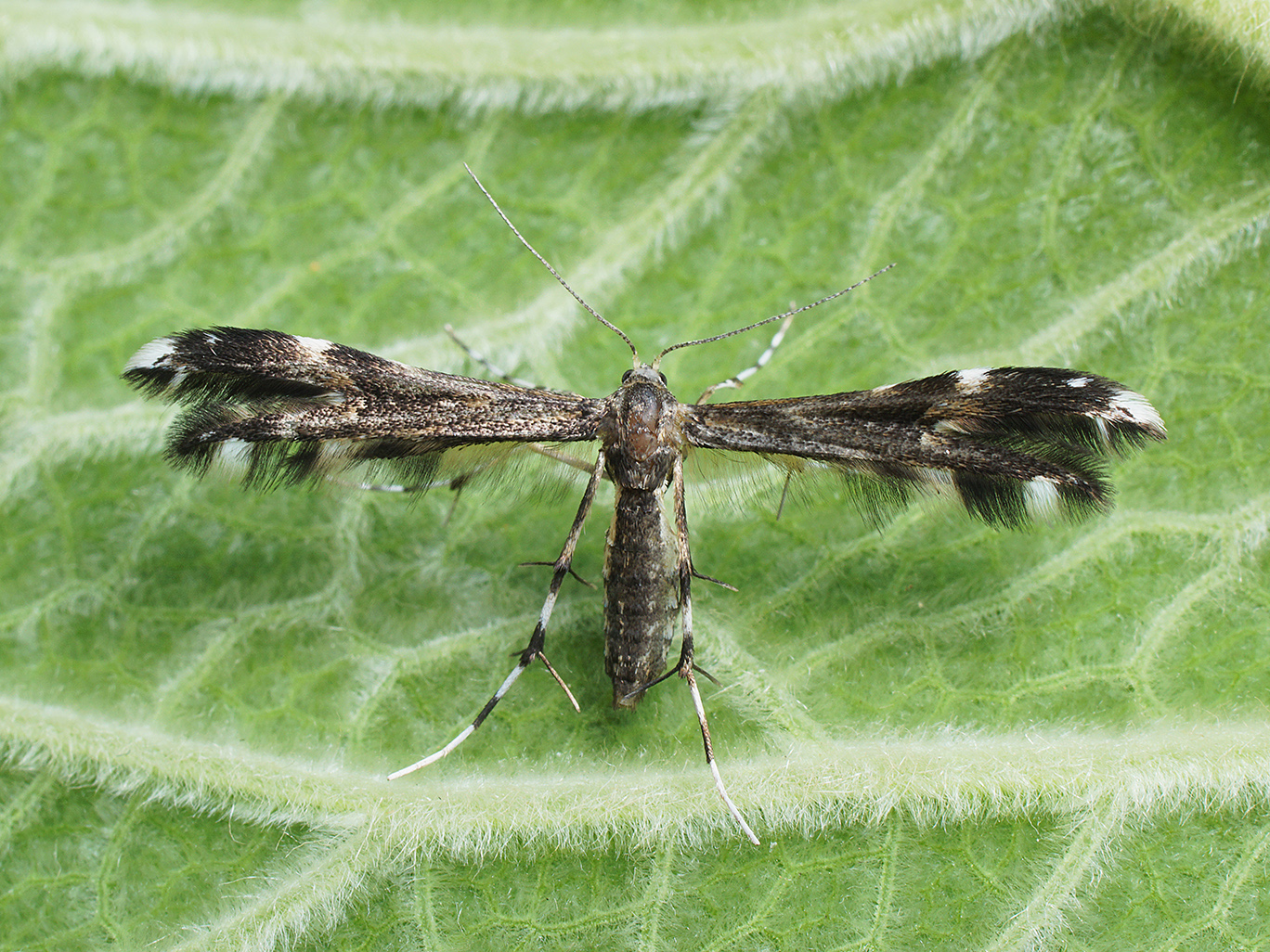

Scientific classification
- Kingdom: Animalia
- Phylum: Arthropoda
- Class: Insecta
- Order: Lepidoptera
- Family: Pterophoridae
- Genus: Pselnophorus
- Species: P. heterodactyla

Binomial name
- Pselnophorus heterodactyla (Müller, 1764)

Synonyms
- List: Phalaena Alucita heterodactyla Müller, 1764; Alucita brachydactyla Kollar, 1832; Alucita brachydactyla Treitschke, 1833; Pterophorus aetodactylus Duponchel, 1840

= Pselnophorus heterodactyla =

Species of plume moth

Pselnophorus heterodactyla, also known as the short-winged plume, is a moth of the family Pterophoridae found in most of Europe. It was first described by Danish naturalist, Otto Friedrich Müller in 1764.

== Description ==
The wingspan is 18–22 millimetres (0.71–0.87 in). Adults are on wing in June and July in western Europe.

The larvae feed on wall lettuce (Mycelis muralis), purple lettuce (Prenanthes purpurea), marsh hawk's-beard (Crepis paludosa) and common nipplewort (Lapsana communis). Pupation takes place along the stem.
