= Pselnophorus zulu =

Scientific classification
- Kingdom: Animalia
- Phylum: Arthropoda
- Class: Insecta
- Order: Lepidoptera
- Family: Pterophoridae
- Genus: Pselnophorus
- Species: P. zulu

Binomial name
- Pselnophorus zulu Ustjuzhanin et Kovtunovich, 2010

Species of plume moth

Pselnophorus zulu is a moth of the family Pterophoridae that is known from South Africa.
