= Pselnophorus laudatus =

Scientific classification
- Kingdom: Animalia
- Phylum: Arthropoda
- Clade: Pancrustacea
- Class: Insecta
- Order: Lepidoptera
- Family: Pterophoridae
- Genus: Pselnophorus
- Species: P. laudatus

Binomial name
- Pselnophorus laudatus Bigot, 1964

Species of plume moth

Pselnophorus laudatus is a moth of the family Pterophoridae that is known from Madagascar.
