= Pselnophorus poggei =

Scientific classification
- Kingdom: Animalia
- Phylum: Arthropoda
- Class: Insecta
- Order: Lepidoptera
- Family: Pterophoridae
- Genus: Pselnophorus
- Species: P. poggei

Binomial name
- Pselnophorus poggei (Mann, 1862)

Synonyms
- Oxyptilus poggei Mann, 1862; Leioptilus minutus Alphéraky, 1876; Pselnophorus borzhomi Zagulajev, 1987

Species of plume moth

Pselnophorus poggei is a moth of the family Pterophoridae that is found in Ukraine, southern Russia, Iran and Asia Minor.
