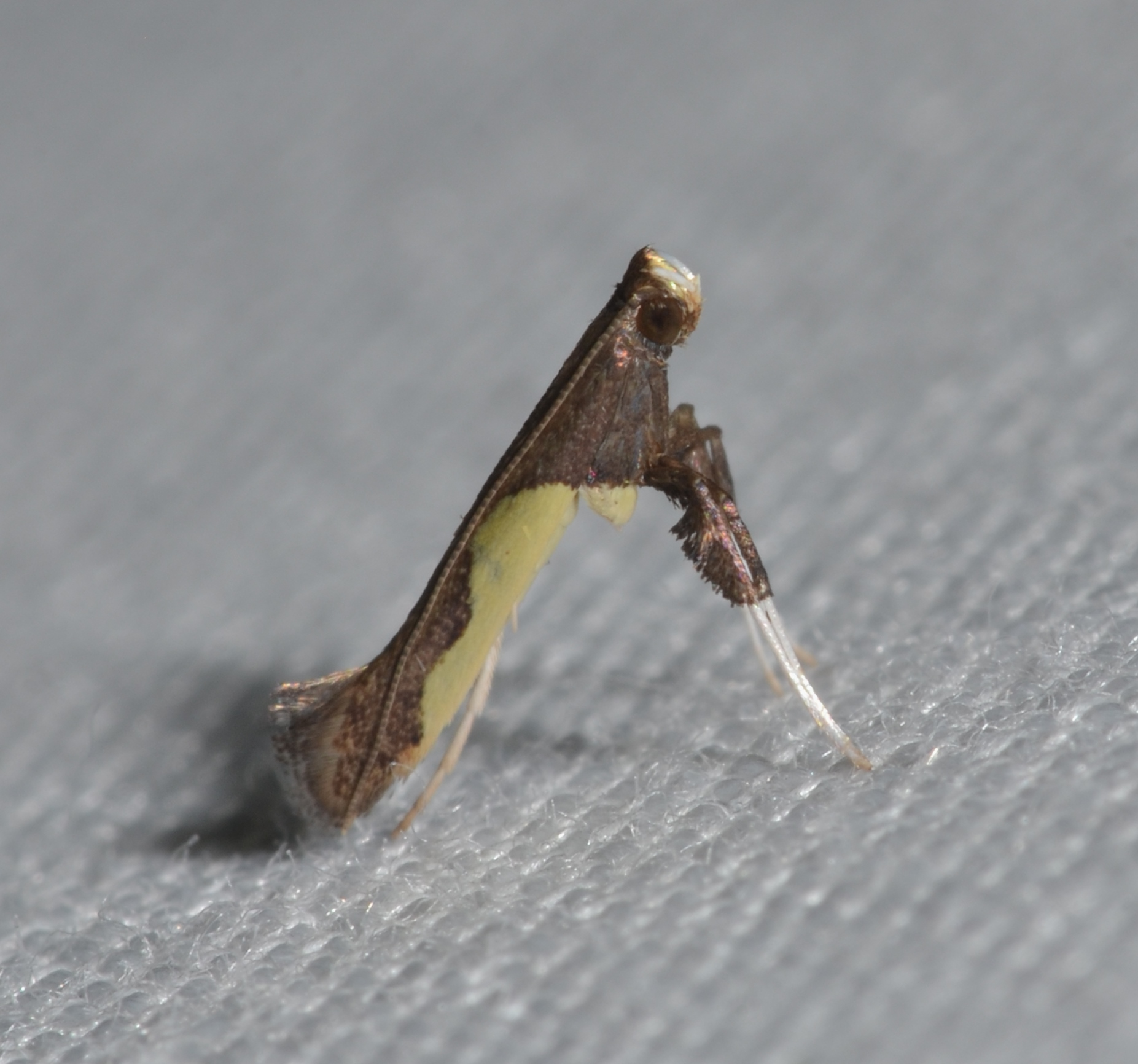

Scientific classification
- Kingdom: Animalia
- Phylum: Arthropoda
- Clade: Pancrustacea
- Class: Insecta
- Order: Lepidoptera
- Family: Gracillariidae
- Genus: Caloptilia
- Species: C. belfragella

Binomial name
- Caloptilia belfragella (Chambers, 1875)

Synonyms
- Caloptilia auriferella (Frey & Boll, 1876); Caloptilia belfrageella (Chambers, 1875)

= Caloptilia belfragella =

Species of moth

Caloptilia belfragella is a moth of the family Gracillariidae. It is known from Quebec and the United States (including Texas, Maine, Kentucky, Ohio, Illinois and Michigan).

The larvae feed on Rhus typhina, Cornus species (including Cornus asperifolia and Cornus drummondii) and Vaccinium species. They mine the leaves of their host plant.
