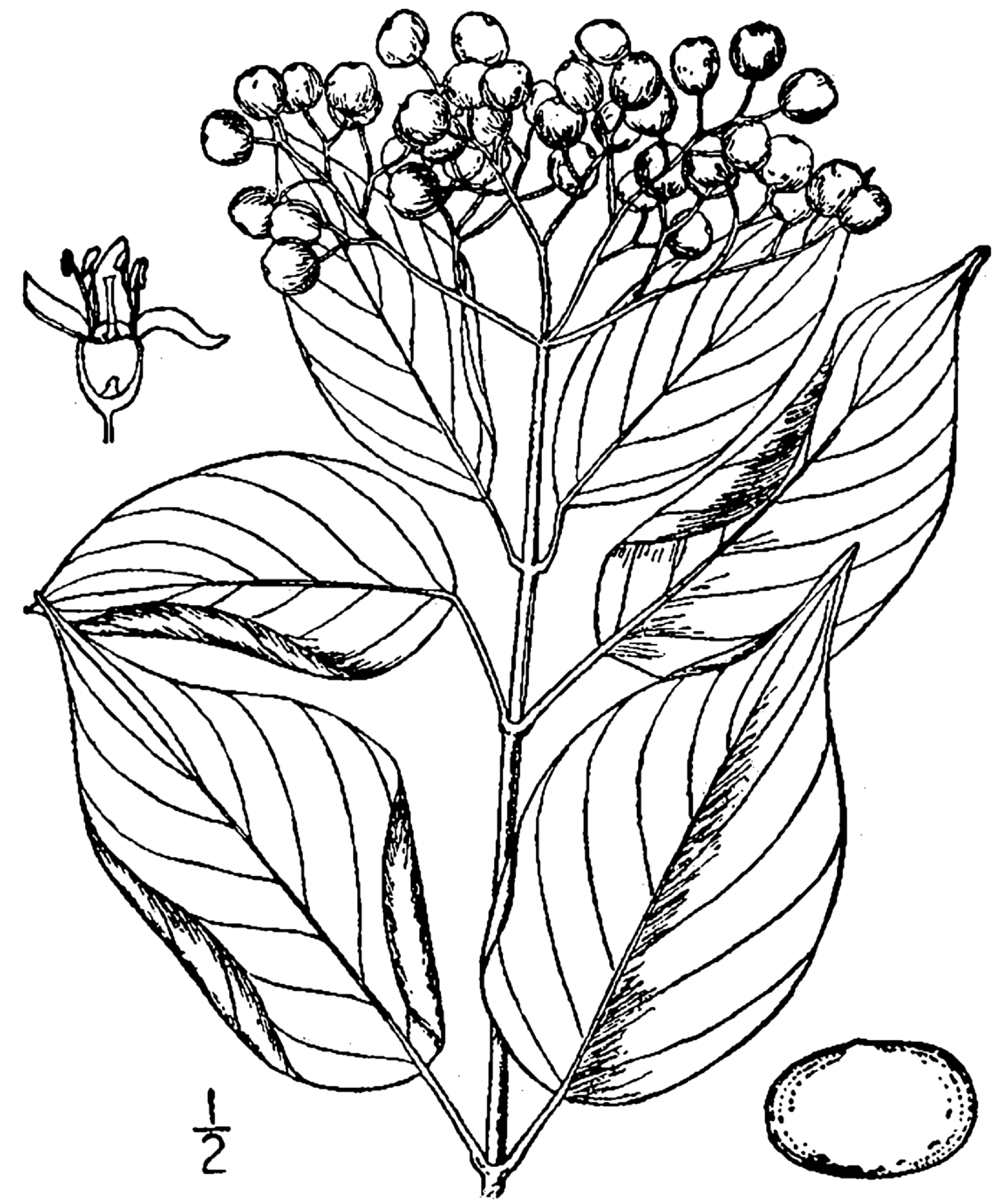
- Cornus asperifolia botanical illustration

Scientific classification
- Kingdom: Plantae
- Clade: Tracheophytes
- Clade: Angiosperms
- Clade: Eudicots
- Clade: Asterids
- Order: Cornales
- Family: Cornaceae
- Genus: Cornus
- Subgenus: Cornus subg. Kraniopsis
- Species: C. asperifolia

Binomial name
- Cornus asperifolia Michx.

Synonyms
- List: Cornus foemina subsp. microcarpa (Nash) J.S.Wilson; Cornus microcarpa Nash; Cornus sericea var. asperifolia (Michx.) DC.; Swida asperifolia (Michx.) Small; Swida microcarpa (Nash) Small; Thelycrania asperifolia (Michx.) Pojark.; Thelycrania microcarpa (Nash) Pojark.

= Cornus asperifolia =

Species of plant

Cornus asperifolia, called toughleaf dogwood, is species of Cornus native to the southeastern United States. A shrub or small tree typically 3 to 5 m tall, it has yellow‑white flowers and white fruit.
