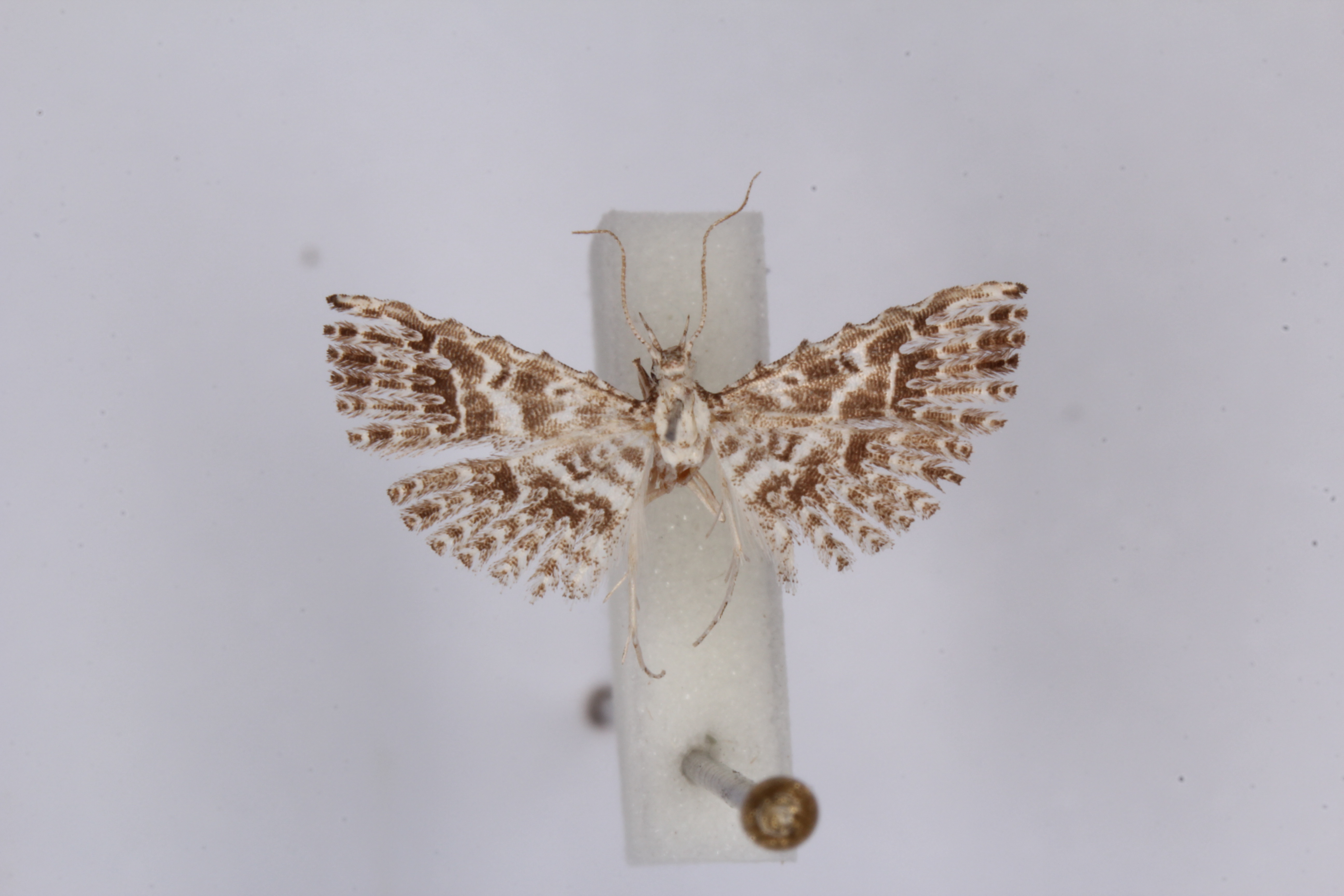
- Triscaedecia svetlanae, holotype specimen, Genting Tea Estate, West Pahang, Malaysia, 30 November 1994
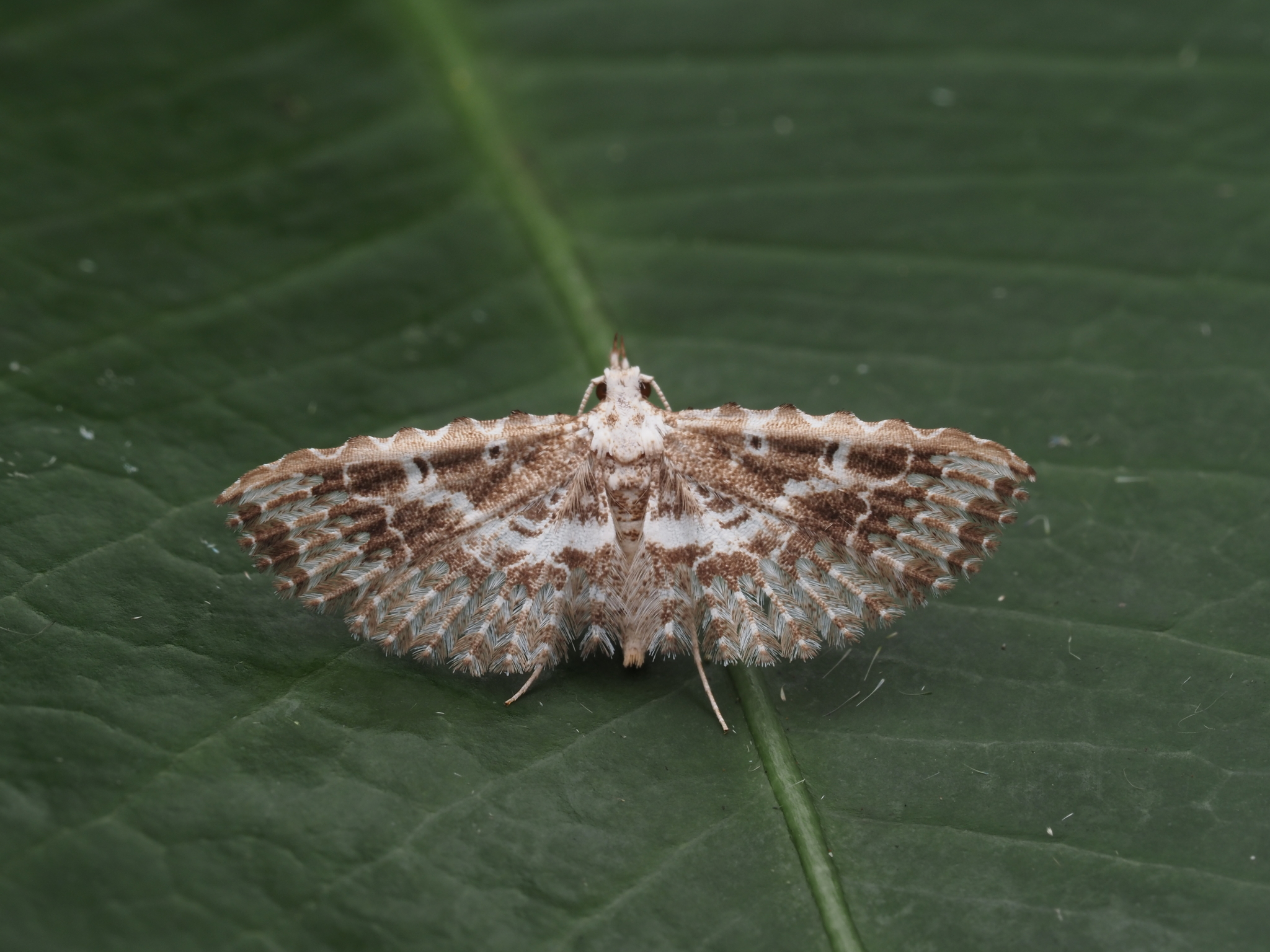
- Triscaedecia svetlanae, adult, Hill Lodge, Kinabalu Park, Sabah, Malaysia, 3 February 2025

Scientific classification
- Kingdom: Animalia
- Phylum: Arthropoda
- Clade: Pancrustacea
- Class: Insecta
- Order: Lepidoptera
- Family: Alucitidae
- Genus: Triscaedecia
- Species: T. svetlanae

Binomial name
- Triscaedecia svetlanae Ustjuzhanin, Kovtunovich & Hobern 2019

= Triscaedecia svetlanae =

Species of moth

Triscaedecia svetlanae is a moth of the family Alucitidae. It was described by Petr Ustjuzhanin, Vasiliy Kovtunovich and Donald Hobern in 2019. It is found in West Pahang and Sabah, Malaysia.
