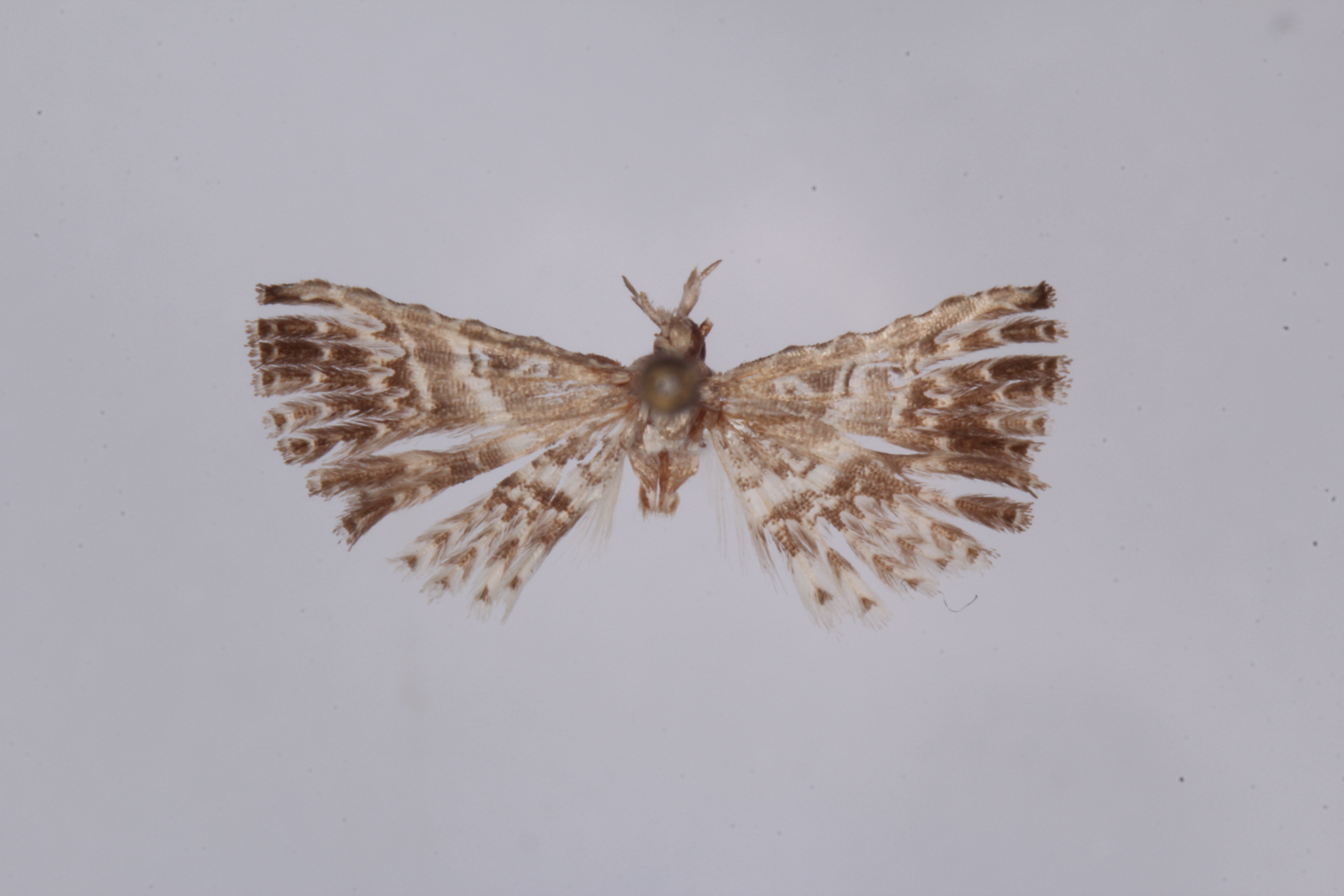
- Adult specimen of Triscaedecia septemdactyla

Scientific classification
- Kingdom: Animalia
- Phylum: Arthropoda
- Class: Insecta
- Order: Lepidoptera
- Family: Alucitidae
- Genus: Triscaedecia
- Species: T. septemdactyla

Binomial name
- Triscaedecia septemdactyla (Pagenstecher, 1900)

Synonyms
- Hofmannia septemdactyla Pagenstecher, 1900

= Triscaedecia septemdactyla =

Species of moth

Triscaedecia septemdactyla is a moth of the family Alucitidae. It was described by Pagenstecher in 1900 as Hofmannia septemdactyla. It is found in Papua (Western New Guinea) and Papua New Guinea.
