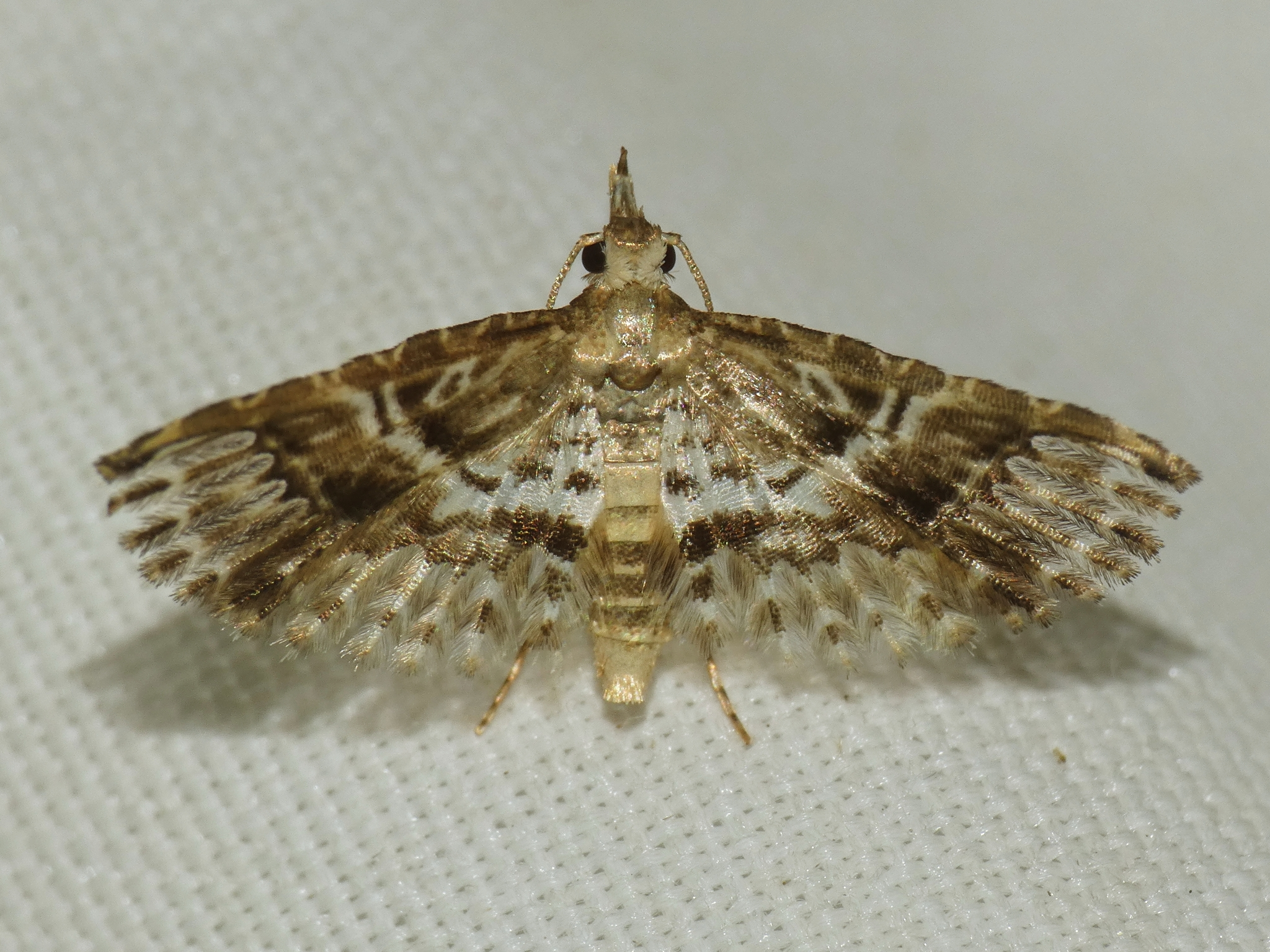
- Triscaedecia sp., Daintree Rainforest, QLD, Australia, 29 November 2025
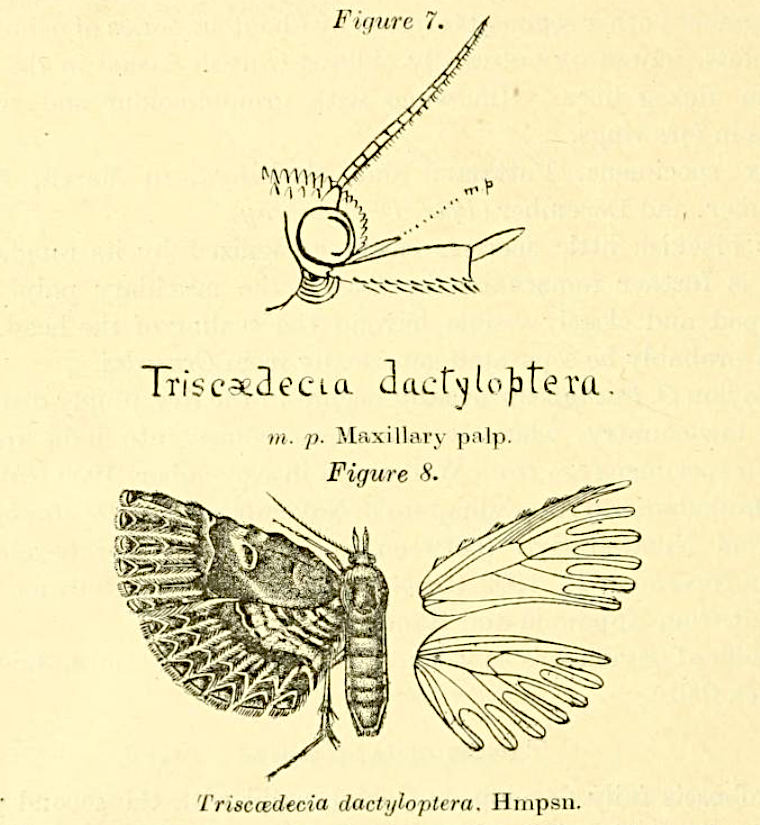
- Triscaedecia dactyloptera

Scientific classification
- Kingdom: Animalia
- Phylum: Arthropoda
- Clade: Pancrustacea
- Class: Insecta
- Order: Lepidoptera
- Family: Alucitidae
- Genus: Triscaedecia; Hampson, 1905

Synonyms
- Hofmannia Pagenstecher, 1900 (preocc. Wocke, 1877)

= Triscaedecia =

Genus of moths

Triscaedecia is a genus of moths in the family Alucitidae, found in the Malay and Polynesian regions. Triscaedecia is distinguished from all other genera in the family by the hindwings being split into seven, instead of six, lobes. The lobes in both wings are only split to about two-thirds of the length of the wings. The genus was erected by George Hampson in 1905.

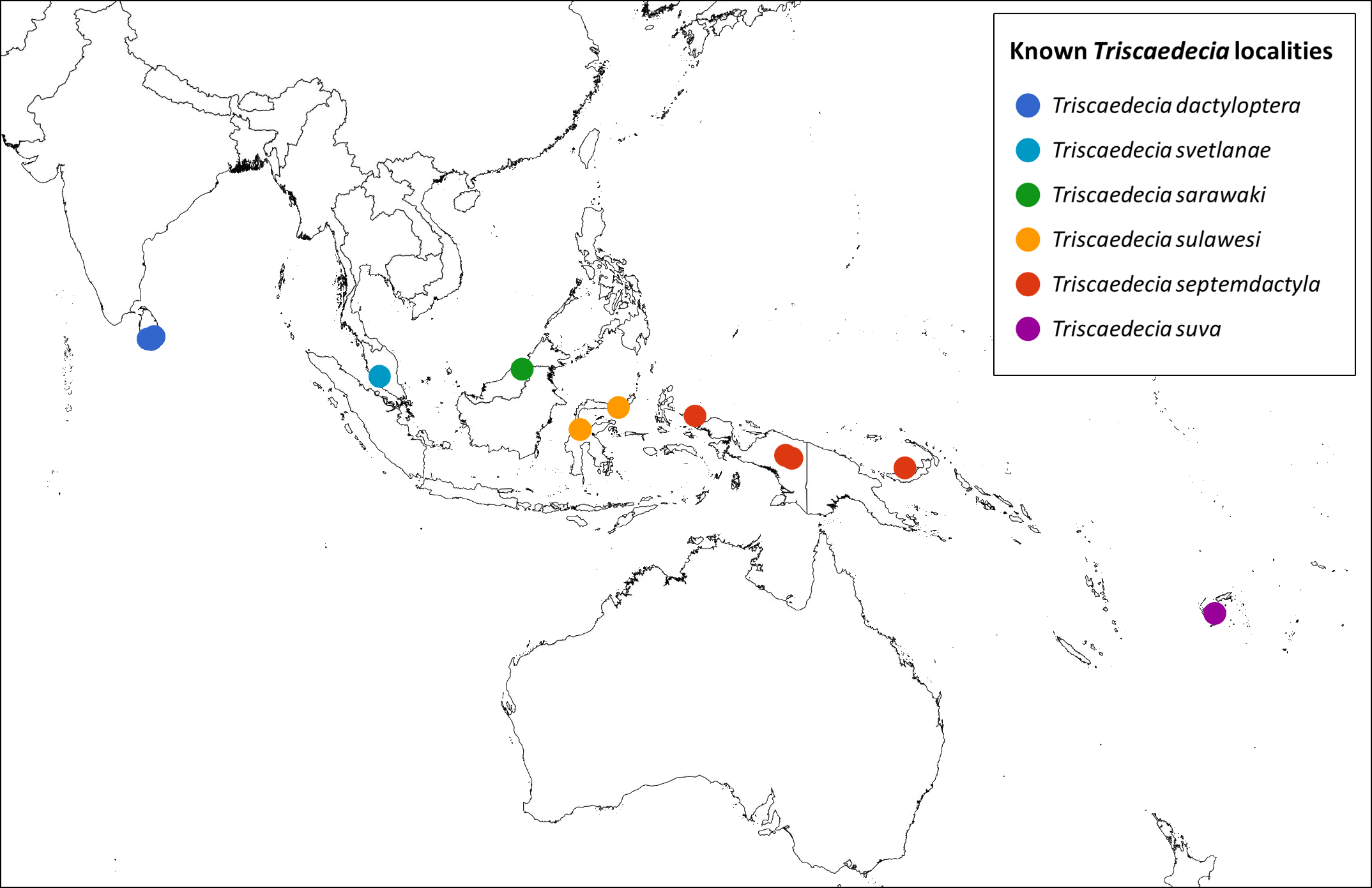
Known localities for all Triscaedecia species

== Species ==
- Triscaedecia dactyloptera Hampson, 1905
- Triscaedecia sarawaki Ustjuzhanin, Kovtunovich & Hobern, 2019
- Triscaedecia septemdactyla (Pagenstecher, 1900)
- Triscaedecia sulawesi Ustjuzhanin, Kovtunovich & Hobern, 2019
- Triscaedecia suva Ustjuzhanin, Kovtunovich & Hobern, 2019
- Triscaedecia svetlanae Ustjuzhanin, Kovtunovich & Hobern, 2019
