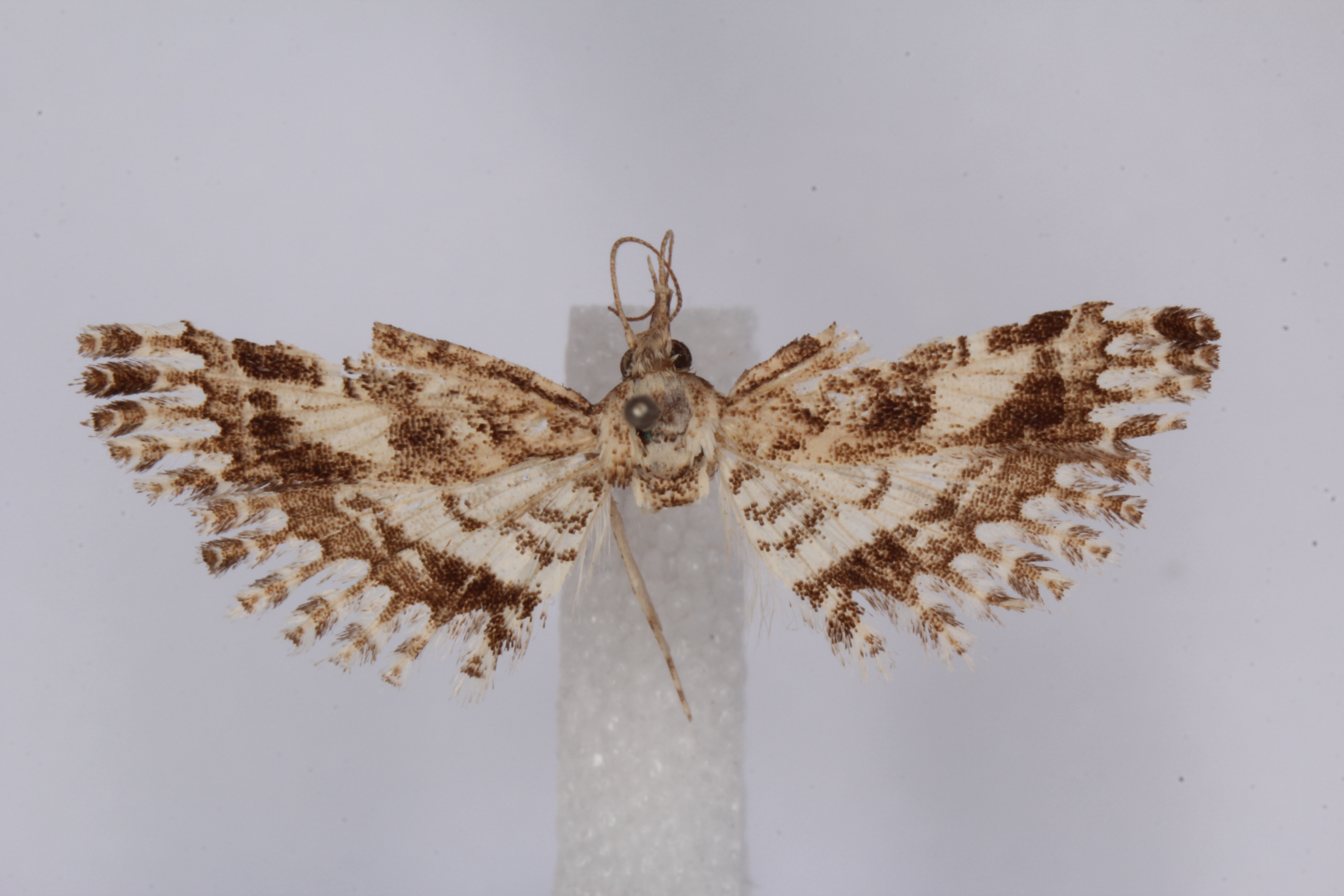

Scientific classification
- Kingdom: Animalia
- Phylum: Arthropoda
- Clade: Pancrustacea
- Class: Insecta
- Order: Lepidoptera
- Family: Alucitidae
- Genus: Triscaedecia
- Species: T. suva

Binomial name
- Triscaedecia suva Ustjuzhanin, Kovtunovich & Hobern 2019

= Triscaedecia suva =

Species of moth

Triscaedecia suva is a moth of the family Alucitidae. It was described by Petr Ustjuzhanin, Vasiliy Kovtunovich and Donald Hobern in 2019. It is found in Fiji.
