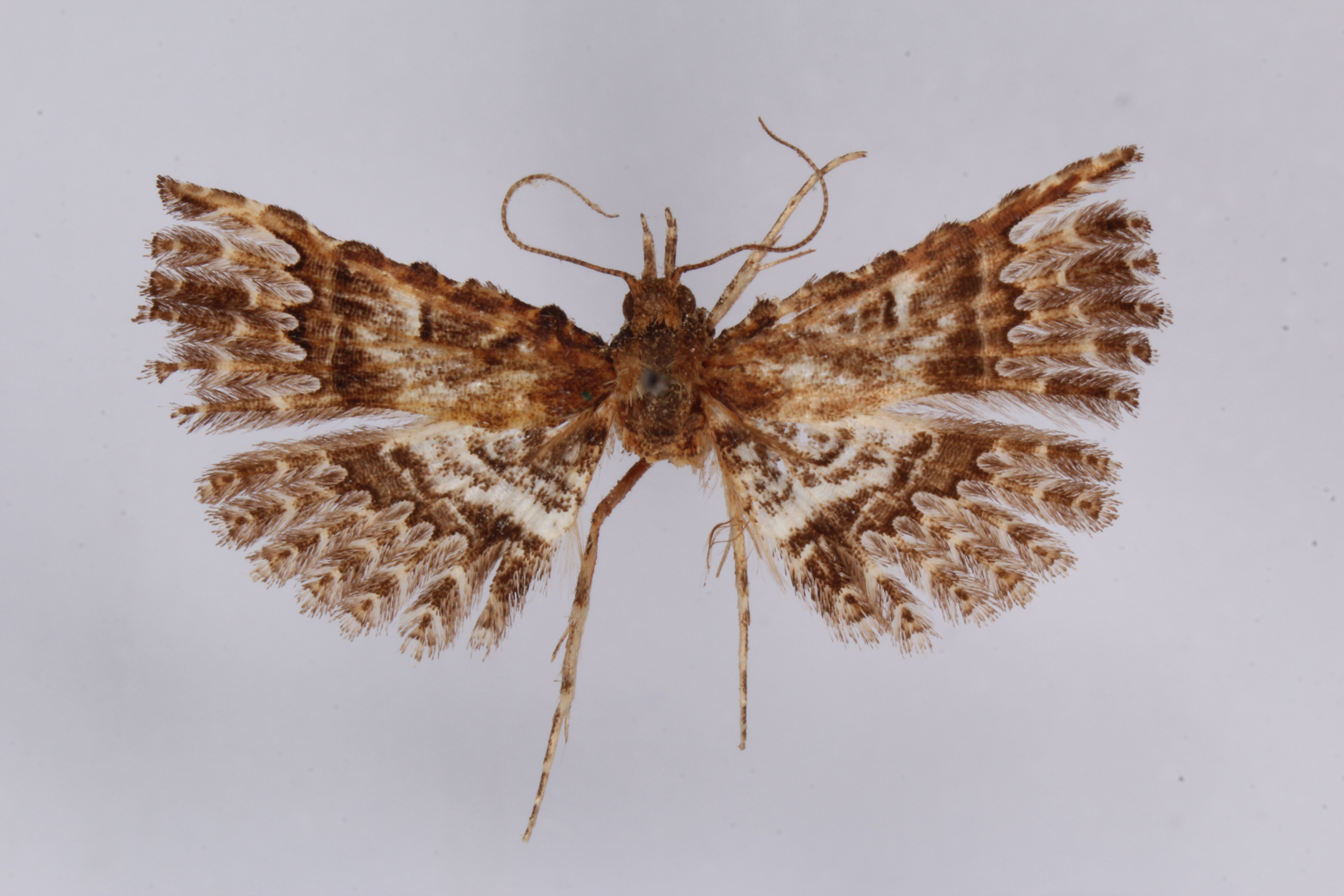
- Adult specimen of Triscaedecia dactyloptera

Scientific classification
- Kingdom: Animalia
- Phylum: Arthropoda
- Clade: Pancrustacea
- Class: Insecta
- Order: Lepidoptera
- Family: Alucitidae
- Genus: Triscaedecia
- Species: T. dactyloptera

Binomial name
- Triscaedecia dactyloptera Hampson, 1905

= Triscaedecia dactyloptera =

Species of moth

Triscaedecia dactyloptera is a moth of the family Alucitidae, described by George Hampson in 1905. It is larger than the other described species in the genus Triscaedecia (26 mm wingspan) and has only been recorded from Sri Lanka.
