= Hexeretmis =

Scientific classification
- Kingdom: Animalia
- Phylum: Arthropoda
- Class: Insecta
- Order: Lepidoptera
- Family: Alucitidae
- Genus: Hexeretmis; Meyrick, 1929

Genus of moths

Hexeretmis is a genus of moths in the family Alucitidae.

== Species ==
- Hexeretmis argo Meyrick, 1929
- Hexeretmis argobrunnea Heppner, Kovtunovich & Ustjuzhanin, 2024
- Hexeretmis pontopora Meyrick
- Hexeretmis willineri
