= Hexeretmis willineri =

Scientific classification
- Kingdom: Animalia
- Phylum: Arthropoda
- Class: Insecta
- Order: Lepidoptera
- Family: Alucitidae
- Genus: Hexeretmis
- Species: H. willineri

Binomial name
- Hexeretmis willineri Pastrana, 1954

Species of insect

Hexeretmis willineri is a moth of the family Alucitidae. It is found in Bolivia.
