= Hexeretmis argo =

Scientific classification
- Kingdom: Animalia
- Phylum: Arthropoda
- Class: Insecta
- Order: Lepidoptera
- Family: Alucitidae
- Genus: Hexeretmis
- Species: H. argo

Binomial name
- Hexeretmis argo Meyrick, 1929

Species of moth

Hexeretmis argo is a moth of the family Alucitidae. It was described by Edward Meyrick in 1929. It is found in Peru.
