= Hexeretmis pontopora =

Scientific classification
- Kingdom: Animalia
- Phylum: Arthropoda
- Class: Insecta
- Order: Lepidoptera
- Family: Alucitidae
- Genus: Hexeretmis
- Species: H. pontopora

Binomial name
- Hexeretmis pontopora Meyrick, 1934

Species of moth

Hexeretmis pontopora is a moth of the family Alucitidae. It is found in Brazil.
