= Crescens (disambiguation) =

Crescens may refer to:

== People ==
- Crescens, Christian saint
- Crescens the Cynic (fl. 2nd century AD), Cynic philosopher
- Crescens Robinson (1864–1941), English cricketer
- Valerius Crescens Fulvianus, Roman governor of Britain

== Other uses ==
- Hellinsia crescens, species of moth
