= Hellinsia sordidatus =

Scientific classification
- Kingdom: Animalia
- Phylum: Arthropoda
- Clade: Pancrustacea
- Class: Insecta
- Order: Lepidoptera
- Family: Pterophoridae
- Genus: Hellinsia
- Species: H. sordidatus

Binomial name
- Hellinsia sordidatus (Meyrick, 1912)

Synonyms
- Pterophorus sordidatus Meyrick, 1912

Species of moth

Hellinsia sordidatus is a moth of the family Pterophoridae. It is known from South Africa.
