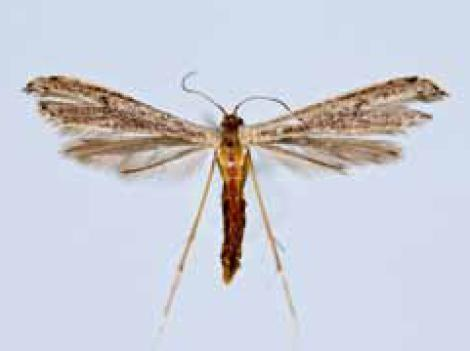

Scientific classification
- Kingdom: Animalia
- Phylum: Arthropoda
- Class: Insecta
- Order: Lepidoptera
- Family: Pterophoridae
- Genus: Hellinsia
- Species: H. spermatias

Binomial name
- Hellinsia spermatias (Meyrick, 1908)

Synonyms
- Pterophorus spermatias Meyrick, 1908

= Hellinsia spermatias =

Species of moth

Hellinsia spermatias is a moth of the family Pterophoridae. It is found in Brazil and Paraguay.

The wingspan is 16–17 mm. The head is ochreous-brown, but whitish between the antennae. These are whitish, towards base with a dark line above. The thorax is ochreous-whitish, tinged or sprinkled with brownish. The abdomen is ochreous-whitish, with dorsal series of blackish dots on the segmental margins. The hindwings are grey. Adults are on wing from December to June.
