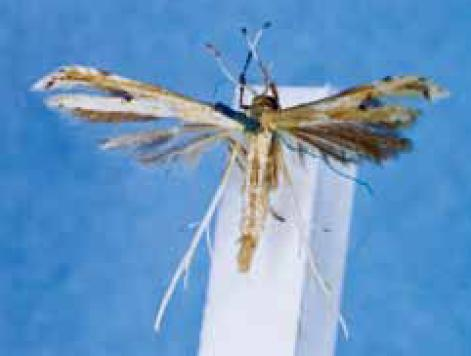

Scientific classification
- Kingdom: Animalia
- Phylum: Arthropoda
- Class: Insecta
- Order: Lepidoptera
- Family: Pterophoridae
- Genus: Hellinsia
- Species: H. discors

Binomial name
- Hellinsia discors (Meyrick, 1913)

Synonyms
- Pterophorus discors Meyrick, 1913

= Hellinsia discors =

Species of plume moth

Hellinsia discors is a moth of the family Pterophoridae that is endemic to Guyana.

The wingspan is 12‑13 mm. Adults are on wing from January to March.
