= Hellinsia logistes =

Scientific classification
- Kingdom: Animalia
- Phylum: Arthropoda
- Class: Insecta
- Order: Lepidoptera
- Family: Pterophoridae
- Genus: Hellinsia
- Species: H. logistes

Binomial name
- Hellinsia logistes (Meyrick, 1935)

Synonyms
- Pterophorus logistes Meyrick, 1935

Species of plume moth

Hellinsia logistes is a moth of the family Pterophoridae. It is found in southern China.
