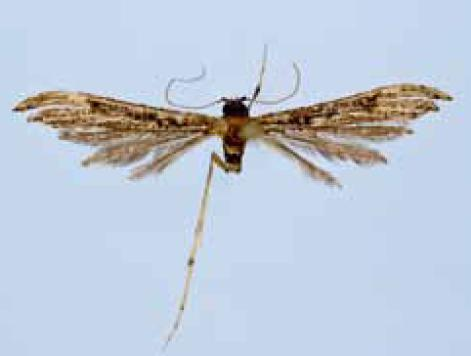

Scientific classification
- Kingdom: Animalia
- Phylum: Arthropoda
- Class: Insecta
- Order: Lepidoptera
- Family: Pterophoridae
- Genus: Hellinsia
- Species: H. shyri

Binomial name
- Hellinsia shyri Gielis, 2011

= Hellinsia shyri =

Species of moth

Hellinsia shyri is a moth of the family Pterophoridae. It is found in Ecuador.

The wingspan is 19–21 mm.
