= Hellinsia carphodactoides =

Scientific classification
- Kingdom: Animalia
- Phylum: Arthropoda
- Clade: Pancrustacea
- Class: Insecta
- Order: Lepidoptera
- Family: Pterophoridae
- Genus: Hellinsia
- Species: H. carphodactoides

Binomial name
- Hellinsia carphodactoides Gielis, 2003

Species of plume moth

Hellinsia carphodactoides is a species of moth in the genus Hellinsia, known from Papua New Guinea. Moths in this species take flight in November, and have a wingspan of approximately 15 millimetres. The specific name "carphodactoides" refers to the species' similarity to its sister taxon Hellinsia carphodactyla.
