= Hellinsia gypsotes =

Scientific classification
- Kingdom: Animalia
- Phylum: Arthropoda
- Class: Insecta
- Order: Lepidoptera
- Family: Pterophoridae
- Genus: Hellinsia
- Species: H. gypsotes

Binomial name
- Hellinsia gypsotes (Meyrick, 1937)

Synonyms
- Pterophorus gypsotes Meyrick, 1937

Species of plume moth

Hellinsia gypsotes is a moth of the family Pterophoridae. It is found in China (Taishan).
