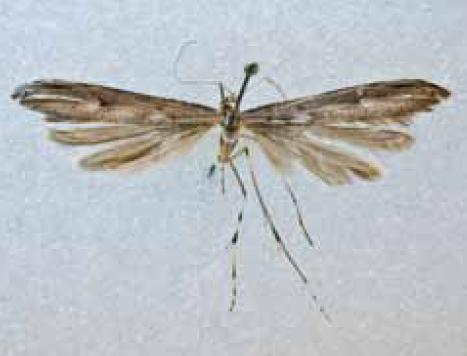

Scientific classification
- Kingdom: Animalia
- Phylum: Arthropoda
- Class: Insecta
- Order: Lepidoptera
- Family: Pterophoridae
- Genus: Hellinsia
- Species: H. montezerpae

Binomial name
- Hellinsia montezerpae Arenberger & Wojtusiak, 2001

= Hellinsia montezerpae =

Species of plume moth

Hellinsia montezerpae is a moth of the family Pterophoridae. It is found in Venezuela.

The wingspan is about 33 millimetres (1.3 in). Adults are on wing in February, at an altitude of 3,250 metres (10,660 ft).
