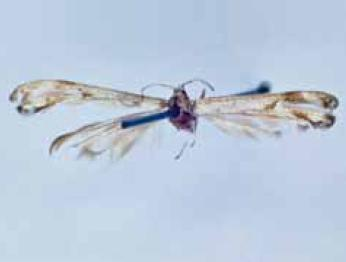

Scientific classification
- Kingdom: Animalia
- Phylum: Arthropoda
- Class: Insecta
- Order: Lepidoptera
- Family: Pterophoridae
- Genus: Hellinsia
- Species: H. fuscotransversa

Binomial name
- Hellinsia fuscotransversa Gielis, 1996

= Hellinsia fuscotransversa =

Species of plume moth

Hellinsia fuscotransversa is a moth of the family Pterophoridae. It is found in Peru.
