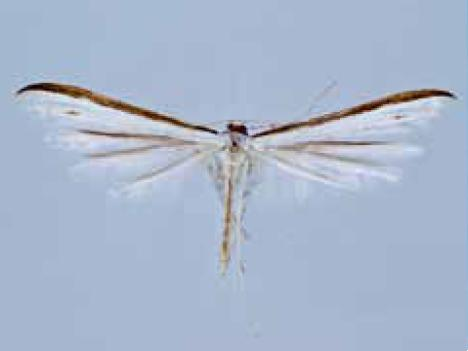

Scientific classification
- Kingdom: Animalia
- Phylum: Arthropoda
- Clade: Pancrustacea
- Class: Insecta
- Order: Lepidoptera
- Family: Pterophoridae
- Genus: Hellinsia
- Species: H. ochricostatus

Binomial name
- Hellinsia ochricostatus (Zeller, 1877)

Synonyms
- Leioptilus ochricostatus Zeller, 1877; Oidaematophorus ochricostatus

= Hellinsia ochricostatus =

Species of plume moth

Hellinsia ochricostatus is a moth of the family Pterophoridae that is found in Colombia and Ecuador.

The wingspan is 27 millimetres (1.1 in). Adults are on wing in October, at an altitude of 3,250 metres (10,660 ft).
