= Hellinsia nuwara =

Scientific classification
- Domain: Eukaryota
- Kingdom: Animalia
- Phylum: Arthropoda
- Class: Insecta
- Order: Lepidoptera
- Family: Pterophoridae
- Genus: Hellinsia
- Species: H. nuwara

Binomial name
- Hellinsia nuwara Kovtunovich, 2001

Species of plume moth

Hellinsia nuwara is a moth of the family Pterophoridae. It is found in Sri Lanka.
