= Hellinsia lacteolus =

Scientific classification
- Domain: Eukaryota
- Kingdom: Animalia
- Phylum: Arthropoda
- Class: Insecta
- Order: Lepidoptera
- Family: Pterophoridae
- Genus: Hellinsia
- Species: H. lacteolus

Binomial name
- Hellinsia lacteolus (Yano, 1963)

Synonyms
- Oidaematophorus lacteolus Yano, 1963; Oidaematophorus lactelous; Oidaematophorus lateolus; Hellinsia lateolus; Hellinsia lactelous

Species of plume moth

Hellinsia lacteolus is a moth of the family Pterophoridae. It is known from Japan (Honshu, Kyushu), North Korea and China.

The length of the forewings is 10–11 mm.
