= Hellinsia innocens =

Scientific classification
- Kingdom: Animalia
- Phylum: Arthropoda
- Class: Insecta
- Order: Lepidoptera
- Family: Pterophoridae
- Genus: Hellinsia
- Species: H. innocens

Binomial name
- Hellinsia innocens (Snellen, 1884)

Synonyms
- Pterophorus innocens Snellen, 1884

Species of plume moth

Hellinsia innocens is a moth of the family Pterophoridae. It is found in Russia (Siberia).
