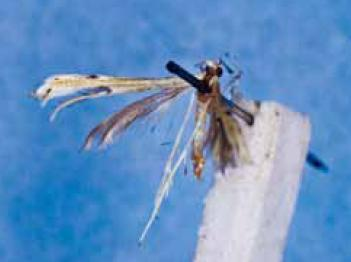

Scientific classification
- Domain: Eukaryota
- Kingdom: Animalia
- Phylum: Arthropoda
- Class: Insecta
- Order: Lepidoptera
- Family: Pterophoridae
- Genus: Hellinsia
- Species: H. urbanus

Binomial name
- Hellinsia urbanus (Walsingham, 1915)

Synonyms
- Pterophorus urbanus Walsingham, 1915

= Hellinsia urbanus =

Species of moth

Hellinsia urbanus is a moth of the family Pterophoridae. It is found in Puerto Rico and Guatemala.
