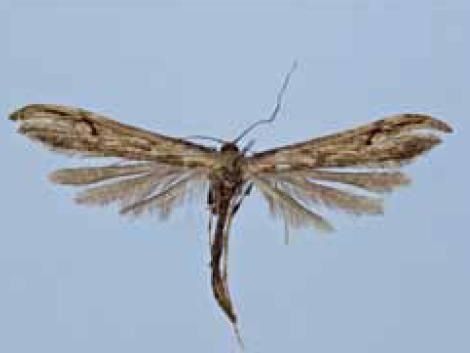

Scientific classification
- Kingdom: Animalia
- Phylum: Arthropoda
- Clade: Pancrustacea
- Class: Insecta
- Order: Lepidoptera
- Family: Pterophoridae
- Genus: Hellinsia
- Species: H. nodipes

Binomial name
- Hellinsia nodipes (Zeller, 1877)

Synonyms
- Mimeseoptilus nodipes Zeller, 1877

= Hellinsia nodipes =

Species of plume moth

Hellinsia nodipes is a moth of the family Pterophoridae. It is found in Mexico, Colombia, Venezuela, Costa Rica and Ecuador.
