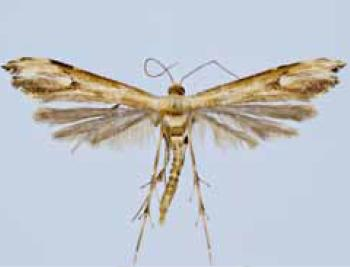

Scientific classification
- Kingdom: Animalia
- Phylum: Arthropoda
- Class: Insecta
- Order: Lepidoptera
- Family: Pterophoridae
- Genus: Hellinsia
- Species: H. malesanus

Binomial name
- Hellinsia malesanus (Meyrick, 1921)

Synonyms
- Pterophorus malesanus Meyrick, 1921

= Hellinsia malesanus =

Species of plume moth

Hellinsia malesanus is a moth of the family Pterophoridae. It is found in Peru.

The wingspan is 19 mm. Adults are on wing in July and August, at altitudes ranging from 150 to 2,000 meters.
