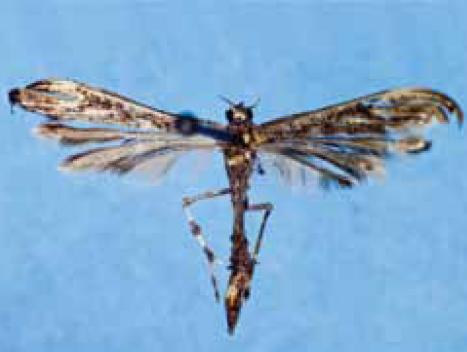

Scientific classification
- Kingdom: Animalia
- Phylum: Arthropoda
- Class: Insecta
- Order: Lepidoptera
- Family: Pterophoridae
- Genus: Hellinsia
- Species: H. calais

Binomial name
- Hellinsia calais (Meyrick, 1930)

Synonyms
- Pterophorus calais Meyrick, 1930

= Hellinsia calais =

Species of plume moth

Hellinsia calais is a moth of the family Pterophoridae. It is found in Brazil and Costa Rica.

The wingspan is 21 mm. Adults are on wing in October.
