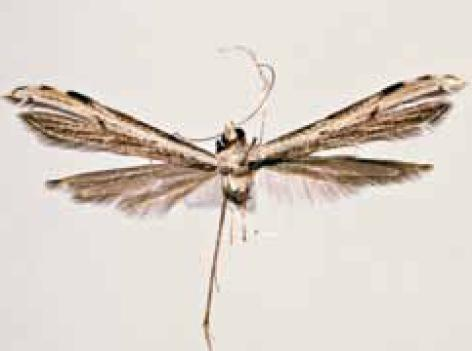

Scientific classification
- Kingdom: Animalia
- Phylum: Arthropoda
- Clade: Pancrustacea
- Class: Insecta
- Order: Lepidoptera
- Family: Pterophoridae
- Genus: Hellinsia
- Species: H. obandoi

Binomial name
- Hellinsia obandoi Gielis, 1999

= Hellinsia obandoi =

Species of plume moth

Hellinsia obandoi is a moth of the family Pterophoridae that is endemic to Costa Rica.

Adults are on wing in August.
