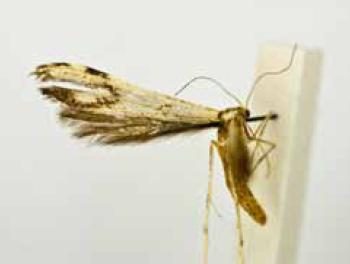

Scientific classification
- Kingdom: Animalia
- Phylum: Arthropoda
- Class: Insecta
- Order: Lepidoptera
- Family: Pterophoridae
- Genus: Hellinsia
- Species: H. milleri

Binomial name
- Hellinsia milleri Gielis, 2011

= Hellinsia milleri =

Species of plume moth

Hellinsia milleri is a moth of the family Pterophoridae. It is found in Ecuador.

The wingspan is 21 mm. Adults are on wing in March, at an altitude of 3,180 meters.
