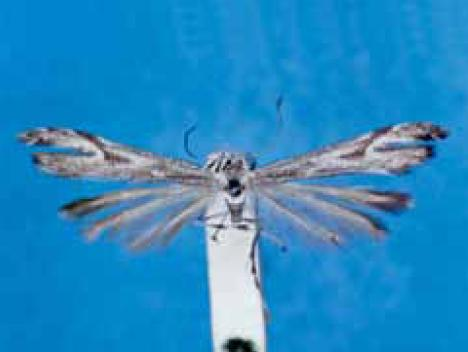

Scientific classification
- Kingdom: Animalia
- Phylum: Arthropoda
- Clade: Pancrustacea
- Class: Insecta
- Order: Lepidoptera
- Family: Pterophoridae
- Genus: Hellinsia
- Species: H. conjunctus

Binomial name
- Hellinsia conjunctus (Zeller, 1877)

Synonyms
- Mimeseoptilus conjunctus Zeller, 1877

= Hellinsia conjunctus =

Species of plume moth

Hellinsia conjunctus is a moth of the family Pterophoridae. It is found in Colombia.

The wingspan is 17 mm.
