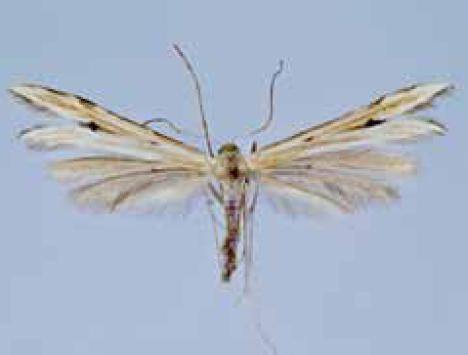

Scientific classification
- Kingdom: Animalia
- Phylum: Arthropoda
- Class: Insecta
- Order: Lepidoptera
- Family: Pterophoridae
- Genus: Hellinsia
- Species: H. betsiae

Binomial name
- Hellinsia betsiae Gielis, 1991

Synonyms
- Oidaematophorus betsiae

= Hellinsia betsiae =

Species of plume moth

Hellinsia betsiae is a moth of the family Pterophoridae that is found in Chile (Curico and Santiago).

The wingspan is 21 millimetres (0.83 in). Adults are on wing in October, December and January.
