= Hellinsia mesoleucus =

Scientific classification
- Kingdom: Animalia
- Phylum: Arthropoda
- Clade: Pancrustacea
- Class: Insecta
- Order: Lepidoptera
- Family: Pterophoridae
- Genus: Hellinsia
- Species: H. mesoleucus

Binomial name
- Hellinsia mesoleucus (Diakonoff, 1952)

Synonyms
- Oidaematophorus mesoleucus Diakanoff, 1952

Species of plume moth

Hellinsia mesoleucus is a moth of the family Pterophoridae. It is known from New Guinea.
