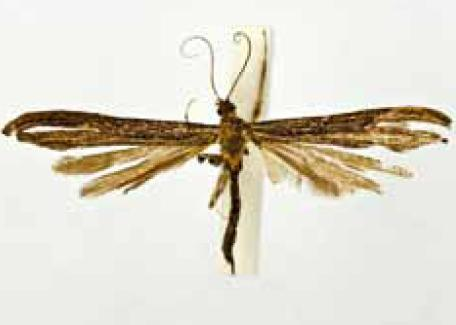

Scientific classification
- Kingdom: Animalia
- Phylum: Arthropoda
- Class: Insecta
- Order: Lepidoptera
- Family: Pterophoridae
- Genus: Hellinsia
- Species: H. pizarroi

Binomial name
- Hellinsia pizarroi Gielis, 2011

= Hellinsia pizarroi =

Species of plume moth

Hellinsia pizarroi is a moth of the family Pterophoridae. It is found in Ecuador.

The wingspan is 30 mm. Adults are on wing in February, at an altitude of 2,900 m.
