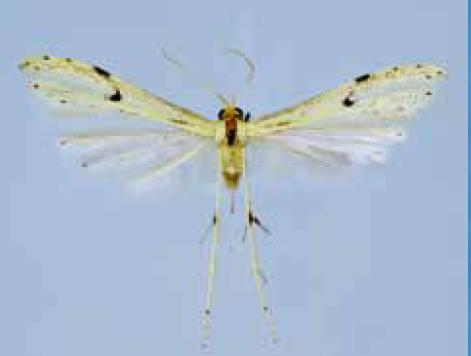

Scientific classification
- Kingdom: Animalia
- Phylum: Arthropoda
- Class: Insecta
- Order: Lepidoptera
- Family: Pterophoridae
- Genus: Hellinsia
- Species: H. pallens

Binomial name
- Hellinsia pallens Gielis, 2011

= Hellinsia pallens =

Species of plume moth

Hellinsia pallens is a moth of the family Pterophoridae. It is found in Ecuador.

Adults are on wing in May, at an altitude of 1,300 m.
