= Hellinsia bawana =

Scientific classification
- Kingdom: Animalia
- Phylum: Arthropoda
- Class: Insecta
- Order: Lepidoptera
- Family: Pterophoridae
- Genus: Hellinsia
- Species: H. bawana

Binomial name
- Hellinsia bawana Arenberger, 2010

Species of plume moth

Hellinsia bawana is a moth of the family Pterophoridae. It is known from Yemen.
