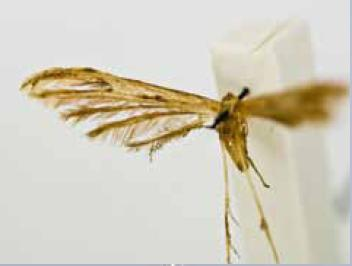

Scientific classification
- Kingdom: Animalia
- Phylum: Arthropoda
- Class: Insecta
- Order: Lepidoptera
- Family: Pterophoridae
- Genus: Hellinsia
- Species: H. lumbaquia

Binomial name
- Hellinsia lumbaquia Gielis, 2011

= Hellinsia lumbaquia =

Species of plume moth

Hellinsia lumbaquia is a moth of the family Pterophoridae. It is found in Ecuador.
