= Hellinsia brandbergi =

Scientific classification
- Kingdom: Animalia
- Phylum: Arthropoda
- Class: Insecta
- Order: Lepidoptera
- Family: Pterophoridae
- Genus: Hellinsia
- Species: H. brandbergi

Binomial name
- Hellinsia brandbergi Arenberger, 2004

Species of plume moth

Hellinsia brandbergi is a moth of the family Pterophoridae. It is known from Namibia.
