= Hellinsia cyrtoacanthaus =

Scientific classification
- Kingdom: Animalia
- Phylum: Arthropoda
- Class: Insecta
- Order: Lepidoptera
- Family: Pterophoridae
- Genus: Hellinsia
- Species: H. cyrtoacanthaus

Binomial name
- Hellinsia cyrtoacanthaus Kim, 2009

Species of plume moth

Hellinsia cyrtoacanthaus is a moth of the family Pterophoridae that is endemic to Korea.

The wingspan is about 16 millimetres (0.63 in).
