= Hellinsia illutus =

Scientific classification
- Kingdom: Animalia
- Phylum: Arthropoda
- Class: Insecta
- Order: Lepidoptera
- Family: Pterophoridae
- Genus: Hellinsia
- Species: H. illutus

Binomial name
- Hellinsia illutus (Meyrick, 1917)

Synonyms
- Pterophorus illutus Meyrick, 1917

Species of plume moth

Hellinsia illutus is a moth of the family Pterophoridae. It is known from South Africa.
