= Hellinsia aldabrensis =

Scientific classification
- Kingdom: Animalia
- Phylum: Arthropoda
- Class: Insecta
- Order: Lepidoptera
- Family: Pterophoridae
- Genus: Hellinsia
- Species: H. aldabrensis

Binomial name
- Hellinsia aldabrensis (T. B. Fletcher, 1910)

Synonyms
- Pterophorus aldabrensis T. B. Fletcher, 1910

Species of plume moth

Hellinsia aldabrensis is a moth of the family Pterophoridae. It was described by Thomas Bainbrigge Fletcher in 1910 and is known from the Seychelles in the Indian Ocean.
