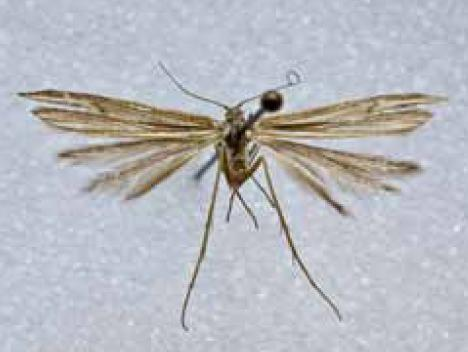

Scientific classification
- Kingdom: Animalia
- Phylum: Arthropoda
- Class: Insecta
- Order: Lepidoptera
- Family: Pterophoridae
- Genus: Hellinsia
- Species: H. batallonica

Binomial name
- Hellinsia batallonica Arenberger & Wojtusiak, 2001

= Hellinsia batallonica =

Species of plume moth

Hellinsia batallonica is a moth of the family Pterophoridae. It is found in Venezuela.

Adults are on wing in March.
