= Hellinsia callidus =

Scientific classification
- Kingdom: Animalia
- Phylum: Arthropoda
- Class: Insecta
- Order: Lepidoptera
- Family: Pterophoridae
- Genus: Hellinsia
- Species: H. callidus

Binomial name
- Hellinsia callidus (Meyrick, 1913)

Synonyms
- Pterophorus callidus Meyrick, 1913

Species of plume moth

Hellinsia callidus is a moth of the family Pterophoridae. It is known from South Africa.
