= Hellinsia improbus =

Scientific classification
- Kingdom: Animalia
- Phylum: Arthropoda
- Class: Insecta
- Order: Lepidoptera
- Family: Pterophoridae
- Genus: Hellinsia
- Species: H. improbus

Binomial name
- Hellinsia improbus (Meyrick, 1934)

Synonyms
- Pterophorus improbus Meyrick, 1934

Species of plume moth

Hellinsia improbus is a moth of the family Pterophoridae. It is found in China (Guangdong).
