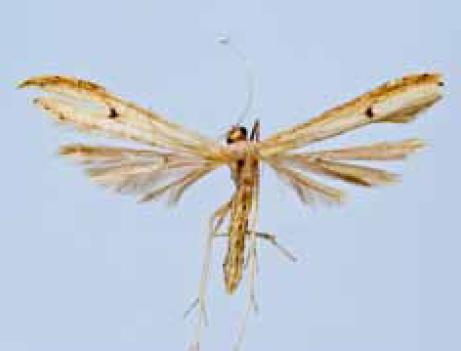

Scientific classification
- Kingdom: Animalia
- Phylum: Arthropoda
- Class: Insecta
- Order: Lepidoptera
- Family: Pterophoridae
- Genus: Hellinsia
- Species: H. delospilus

Binomial name
- Hellinsia delospilus (Meyrick, 1921)

Synonyms
- Pterophorus delospilus Meyrick, 1921

= Hellinsia delospilus =

Species of plume moth

Hellinsia delospilus is a moth of the family Pterophoridae. It is found in Peru and Ecuador.

The wingspan is 16–19 millimetres (0.63–0.75 in). Adults are on wing from March to May.
