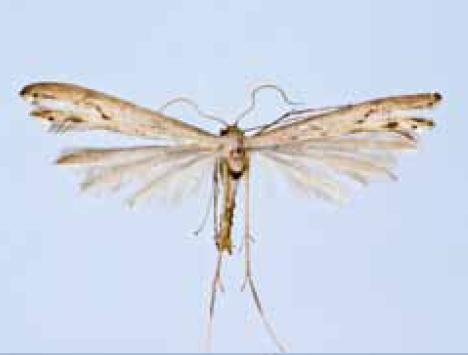

Scientific classification
- Kingdom: Animalia
- Phylum: Arthropoda
- Class: Insecta
- Order: Lepidoptera
- Family: Pterophoridae
- Genus: Hellinsia
- Species: H. caras

Binomial name
- Hellinsia caras Gielis, 2011

= Hellinsia caras =

Species of plume moth

Hellinsia caras is a moth of the family Pterophoridae. It is found in Ecuador and Peru.

Adults are on wing in March and October, at an altitude of 3,000 to 3,450 meters (9,840 to 11,320 ft).

== Etymology ==
In mediaeval times the Caras people were a tribe in Ecuador.
