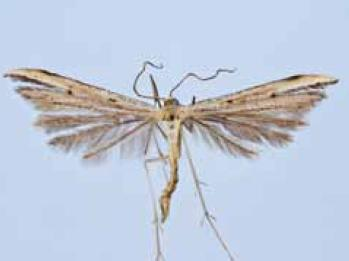

Scientific classification
- Kingdom: Animalia
- Phylum: Arthropoda
- Class: Insecta
- Order: Lepidoptera
- Family: Pterophoridae
- Genus: Hellinsia
- Species: H. grandaevus

Binomial name
- Hellinsia grandaevus (Meyrick, 1931)

Synonyms
- Pterophorus grandaevus Meyrick, 1931

= Hellinsia grandaevus =

Species of plume moth

Hellinsia grandaevus is a moth of the family Pterophoridae. It is found in Chile, Argentina and Bolivia.

The wingspan is 17‑22 mm. Adults are on wing from October to January.
