= Hellinsia punctata =

Scientific classification
- Kingdom: Animalia
- Phylum: Arthropoda
- Class: Insecta
- Order: Lepidoptera
- Family: Pterophoridae
- Genus: Hellinsia
- Species: H. punctata

Binomial name
- Hellinsia punctata Gielis, 2009

Species of plume moth

Hellinsia punctata is a moth of the family Pterophoridae. It is found in the Democratic Republic of the Congo (Haut-Katanga).
