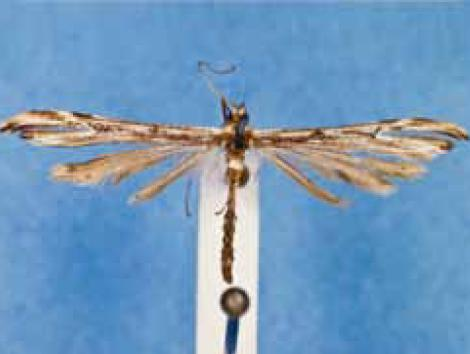

Scientific classification
- Domain: Eukaryota
- Kingdom: Animalia
- Phylum: Arthropoda
- Class: Insecta
- Order: Lepidoptera
- Family: Pterophoridae
- Genus: Hellinsia
- Species: H. nivalis

Binomial name
- Hellinsia nivalis (Meyrick, 1908)

Synonyms
- Pterophorus nivalis Meyrick, 1908

= Hellinsia nivalis =

Species of plume moth

Hellinsia nivalis is a moth of the family Pterophoridae. It is found in Jamaica and Costa Rica.

The wingspan is 22–24 mm. The head is ochreous sprinkled with whitish and the upper half of the face is brown edged beneath with whitish. The antennae are ochreous and the thorax is brownish-ochreous, anteriorly more or less suffused with whitish. The abdomen is brownish-ochreous, but the base and an interrupted lateral streak are white. The forewings are brownish-ochreous, irregularly and variably sprinkled and mixed with white, and sprinkled with dark fuscous. The hindwings are grey. Adults are on wing in May.
