= Hellinsia aistleitneri =

Scientific classification
- Kingdom: Animalia
- Phylum: Arthropoda
- Class: Insecta
- Order: Lepidoptera
- Family: Pterophoridae
- Genus: Hellinsia
- Species: H. aistleitneri

Binomial name
- Hellinsia aistleitneri Arenberger, 2006

Species of plume moth

Hellinsia aistleitneri is a moth of the family Pterophoridae first described by Ernst Arenberger in 2006. It occurs in Cape Verde.
