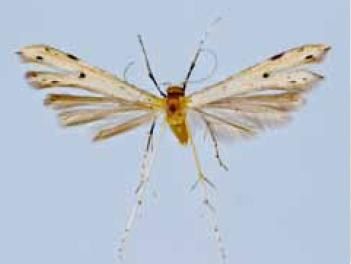

Scientific classification
- Kingdom: Animalia
- Phylum: Arthropoda
- Class: Insecta
- Order: Lepidoptera
- Family: Pterophoridae
- Genus: Hellinsia
- Species: H. morenoi

Binomial name
- Hellinsia morenoi Gielis, 2011

= Hellinsia morenoi =

Species of plume moth

Hellinsia morenoi is a moth of the family Pterophoridae. It is found in Ecuador.

The wingspan is 15 mm. Adults are on wing in December.
