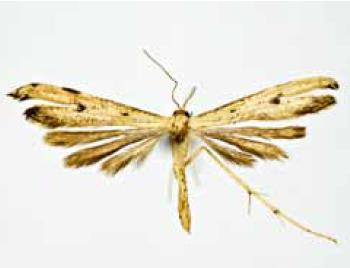

Scientific classification
- Kingdom: Animalia
- Phylum: Arthropoda
- Class: Insecta
- Order: Lepidoptera
- Family: Pterophoridae
- Genus: Hellinsia
- Species: H. praenigratus

Binomial name
- Hellinsia praenigratus (Meyrick, 1921)

Synonyms
- Pterophorus praenigratus Meyrick, 1921; Oidaematophorus praenigratus

= Hellinsia praenigratus =

Species of plume moth

Hellinsia praenigratus is a moth of the family Pterophoridae that is found in Peru and Ecuador.

The wingspan is 15‑20 mm. Adults are on wing in January, from March to May, in October and December.
