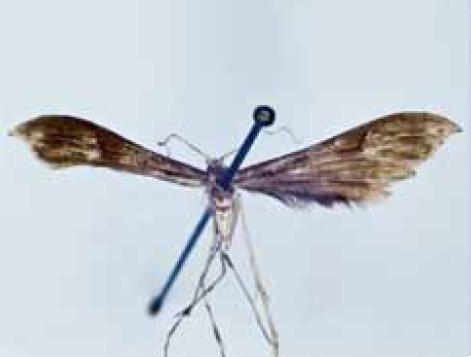

Scientific classification
- Kingdom: Animalia
- Phylum: Arthropoda
- Class: Insecta
- Order: Lepidoptera
- Family: Pterophoridae
- Genus: Hellinsia
- Species: H. spiculibursa

Binomial name
- Hellinsia spiculibursa Gielis, 1996

= Hellinsia spiculibursa =

Species of moth

Hellinsia spiculibursa is a moth of the plume moth or Pterophoridae family . It is found in Venezuela.

Adults are on wing in June and July.
