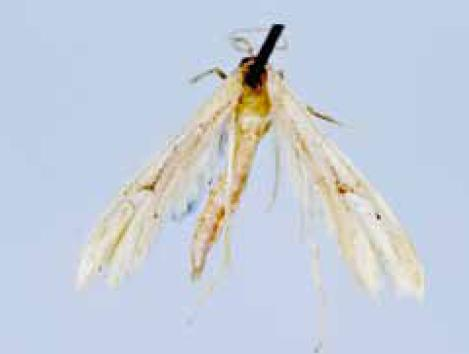

Scientific classification
- Domain: Eukaryota
- Kingdom: Animalia
- Phylum: Arthropoda
- Class: Insecta
- Order: Lepidoptera
- Family: Pterophoridae
- Genus: Hellinsia
- Species: H. epileucus

Binomial name
- Hellinsia epileucus (Walsingham, 1915)

Synonyms
- Pterophorus epileucus Walsingham, 1915

= Hellinsia epileucus =

Species of plume moth

Hellinsia epileucus is a moth of the family Pterophoridae. It is found in Mexico, Costa Rica and Guatemala.

The wingspan is 14–15 mm. Adults are on wing in March, from May to June and from October to November.
