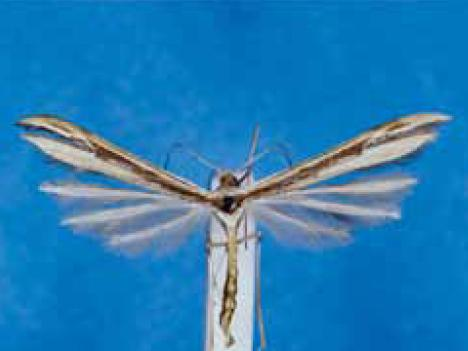

Scientific classification
- Kingdom: Animalia
- Phylum: Arthropoda
- Clade: Pancrustacea
- Class: Insecta
- Order: Lepidoptera
- Family: Pterophoridae
- Genus: Hellinsia
- Species: H. fusciciliatus

Binomial name
- Hellinsia fusciciliatus (Zeller, 1877)

Synonyms
- Mimeseoptilus fusciciliatus Zeller, 1877

= Hellinsia fusciciliatus =

Species of plume moth

Hellinsia fusciciliatus is a moth of the family Pterophoridae. It is found in Colombia, Costa Rica and Venezuela.
