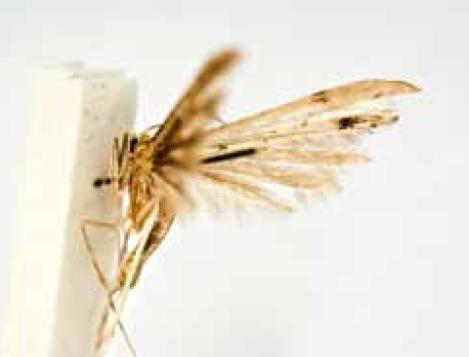

Scientific classification
- Kingdom: Animalia
- Phylum: Arthropoda
- Class: Insecta
- Order: Lepidoptera
- Family: Pterophoridae
- Genus: Hellinsia
- Species: H. scribarius

Binomial name
- Hellinsia scribarius (Meyrick, 1926)

Synonyms
- Pterophorus scribarius Meyrick, 1926

= Hellinsia scribarius =

Species of plume moth

Hellinsia scribarius is a moth of the family Pterophoridae.

== Distribution and description ==
It is found in Colombia and Ecuador.

The wingspan is 20 mm. Adults are on wing in December, at altitudes from 2,200 to 3,840 meters.
