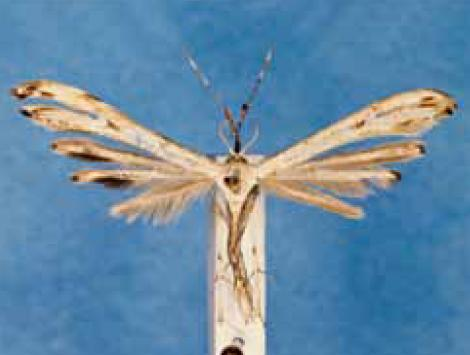

Scientific classification
- Kingdom: Animalia
- Phylum: Arthropoda
- Class: Insecta
- Order: Lepidoptera
- Family: Pterophoridae
- Genus: Hellinsia
- Species: H. glochinias

Binomial name
- Hellinsia glochinias (Meyrick, 1908)

Synonyms
- Pterophorus glochinias Meyrick, 1908

= Hellinsia glochinias =

Species of plume moth

Hellinsia glochinias is a moth of the family Pterophoridae. It is found in Brazil and Costa Rica.

The wingspan is 26–28 mm. The head is ochreous-whitish, more or less irrorated with fuscous or dark fuscous except on the anterior half of the crown. The antennae are ochreous-whitish, with a cloudy fuscous line above. The thorax is pale whitish-ochreous finely sprinkled with fuscous. The abdomen is ochreous-whitish, more or less sprinkled with fuscous on the sides. The forewings are pale whitish-ochreous slightly tinged with brownish, more or less thinly and finely sprinkled with dark fuscous. The hindwings are grey. Adults are on wing in June.
