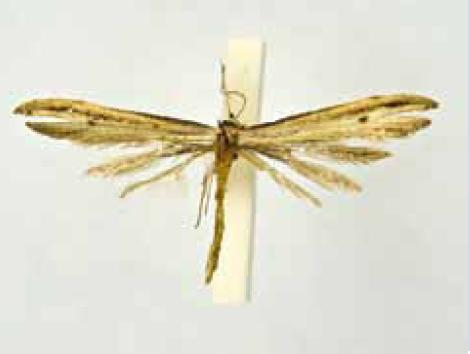

Scientific classification
- Kingdom: Animalia
- Phylum: Arthropoda
- Class: Insecta
- Order: Lepidoptera
- Family: Pterophoridae
- Genus: Hellinsia
- Species: H. sucrei

Binomial name
- Hellinsia sucrei Gielis, 2011

= Hellinsia sucrei =

Species of moth

Hellinsia sucrei is a moth of the family Pterophoridae. It is found in Ecuador.

The wingspan is 27 millimetres (1.1 in). Adults are on wing in January, at an altitude of 3,500 metres (11,500 ft).
