= Hellinsia powelli =

Scientific classification
- Kingdom: Animalia
- Phylum: Arthropoda
- Class: Insecta
- Order: Lepidoptera
- Family: Pterophoridae
- Genus: Hellinsia
- Species: H. powelli

Binomial name
- Hellinsia powelli Gielis, 1996

Synonyms
- Oidaematophorus powelli Gielis, 1996

Species of plume moth

Hellinsia powelli is a moth of the family Pterophoridae that is endemic to Costa Rica.

The wingspan is 21 millimetres (0.83 in). The forewings are dark brown. Adults are on wing in June.
