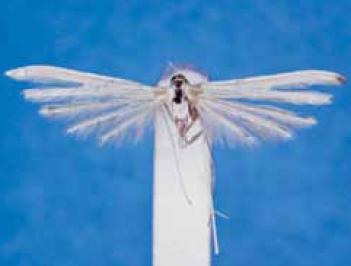

Scientific classification
- Kingdom: Animalia
- Phylum: Arthropoda
- Class: Insecta
- Order: Lepidoptera
- Family: Pterophoridae
- Genus: Hellinsia
- Species: H. ossipellis

Binomial name
- Hellinsia ossipellis (Walsingham, 1897)

Synonyms
- Pterophorus ossipellis Walsingham, 1897; Oidaematophorus ossipellis

= Hellinsia ossipellis =

Species of plume moth

Hellinsia ossipellis is a moth of the family Pterophoridae that is endemic to Dominican Republic.

The wingspan is 16 millimetres (0.63 in). Adults are on wing in May.
