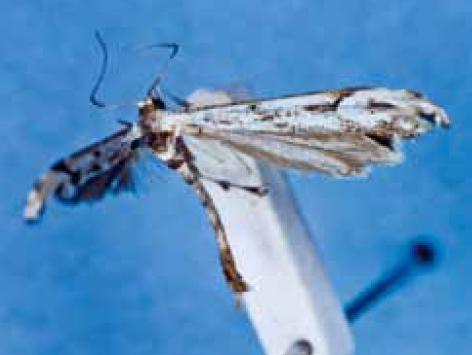

Scientific classification
- Domain: Eukaryota
- Kingdom: Animalia
- Phylum: Arthropoda
- Class: Insecta
- Order: Lepidoptera
- Family: Pterophoridae
- Genus: Hellinsia
- Species: H. praealtus

Binomial name
- Hellinsia praealtus (Walsingham, 1915)

Synonyms
- Pterophorus praealtus Walsingham, 1915; Hellinsia praeltus; Pterophorus praeltus

= Hellinsia praealtus =

Species of plume moth

Hellinsia praealtus is a moth of the family Pterophoridae. It is found in Guatemala.
