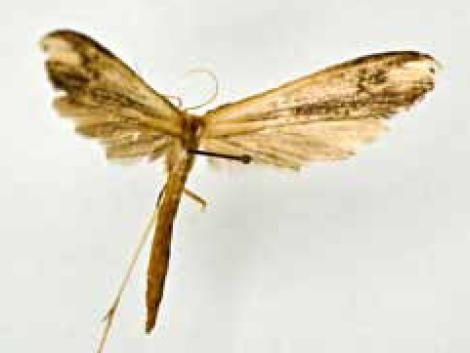

Scientific classification
- Kingdom: Animalia
- Phylum: Arthropoda
- Class: Insecta
- Order: Lepidoptera
- Family: Pterophoridae
- Genus: Hellinsia
- Species: H. magnus

Binomial name
- Hellinsia magnus Gielis, 2011

= Hellinsia magnus =

Species of plume moth

Hellinsia magnus is a moth of the family Pterophoridae. It is found in Ecuador.

The wingspan is 46 mm for males and 58 mm for females. Adults are on wing in January and November.
