= Hellinsia nigrosparsus =

Scientific classification
- Kingdom: Animalia
- Phylum: Arthropoda
- Clade: Pancrustacea
- Class: Insecta
- Order: Lepidoptera
- Family: Pterophoridae
- Genus: Hellinsia
- Species: H. nigrosparsus

Binomial name
- Hellinsia nigrosparsus (Zeller, 1877)

Synonyms
- Leioptilus nigrosparsus Zeller, 1877; Oidaematophorus nigrosparsus

Species of plume moth

Hellinsia nigrosparsus is a moth of the family Pterophoridae. It is found in Peru.

The wingspan is 21 mm.
