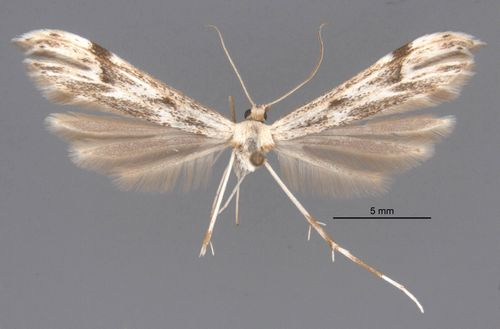

Scientific classification
- Kingdom: Animalia
- Phylum: Arthropoda
- Class: Insecta
- Order: Lepidoptera
- Family: Pterophoridae
- Genus: Hellinsia
- Species: H. citrites

Binomial name
- Hellinsia citrites (Meyrick, 1908)

Synonyms
- Pterophorus citrites Meyrick, 1908

= Hellinsia citrites =

Species of plume moth

Hellinsia citrites is a species of moth in the family Pterophoridae. It is found in North America, including Mississippi, Colorado, Oklahoma and Kentucky.

== Description ==
The wingspan is 24–27 mm. The head is ocherous whitish, but the face and back of the crown are more ocherous tinged. The palpi, antennae and thorax are whitish ocherous. The abdomen is also whitish ocherous, but the sides are more ocherous. The forewings are ocherous, partially tinged with whitish The hindwings are gray.
