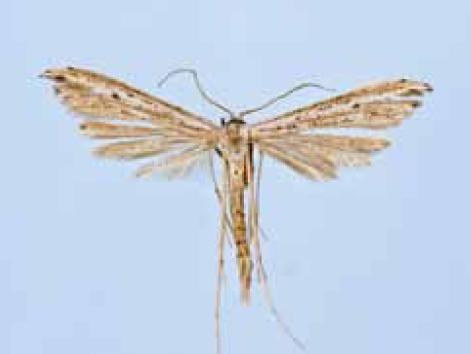

Scientific classification
- Kingdom: Animalia
- Phylum: Arthropoda
- Class: Insecta
- Order: Lepidoptera
- Family: Pterophoridae
- Genus: Hellinsia
- Species: H. canari

Binomial name
- Hellinsia canari Gielis, 2011

= Hellinsia canari =

Species of plume moth

Hellinsia canari is a moth of the family Pterophoridae. It is found in Ecuador.

The wingspan is 15 mm. The forewings are pale ochreous-brown. The hindwings and fringes are brown-grey. Adults are on wing in April.

== Etymology ==
The species is named after the Cañari people living in Ecuador in medieval times.
