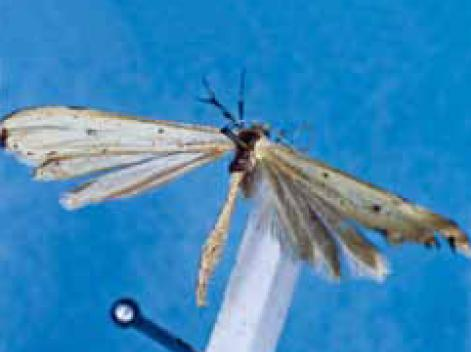
- Pale form
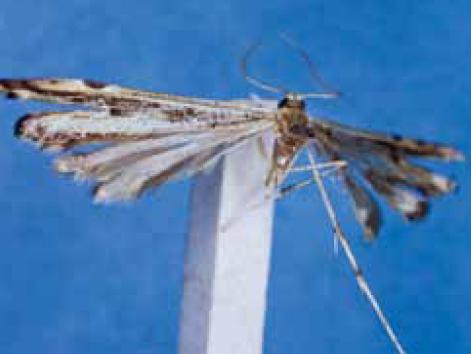
- Dark form

Scientific classification
- Domain: Eukaryota
- Kingdom: Animalia
- Phylum: Arthropoda
- Class: Insecta
- Order: Lepidoptera
- Family: Pterophoridae
- Genus: Hellinsia
- Species: H. ignifugax

Binomial name
- Hellinsia ignifugax (Walsingham, 1915)

Synonyms
- Pterophorus ignifugax Walsingham, 1915

= Hellinsia ignifugax =

Species of plume moth

Hellinsia ignifugax is a moth of the family Pterophoridae. It is found in Guatemala, Costa Rica, Mexico and Nicaragua.

Adults are on wing in May, August and December.
