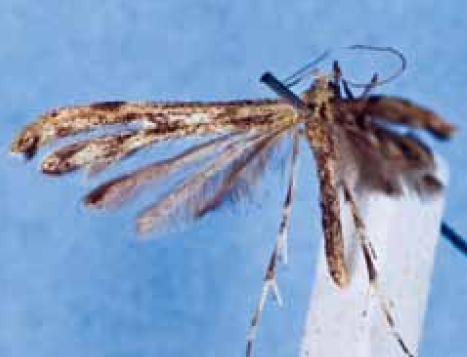

Scientific classification
- Domain: Eukaryota
- Kingdom: Animalia
- Phylum: Arthropoda
- Class: Insecta
- Order: Lepidoptera
- Family: Pterophoridae
- Genus: Hellinsia
- Species: H. tetraonipennis

Binomial name
- Hellinsia tetraonipennis (Walsingham, 1915)

Synonyms
- Pterophorus tetraonipennis Walsingham, 1915

= Hellinsia tetraonipennis =

Species of moth

Hellinsia tetraonipennis is a moth of the family Pterophoridae that is found in Guatemala and Mexico (Sonora).
