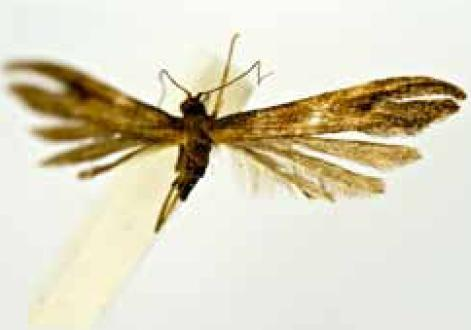

Scientific classification
- Kingdom: Animalia
- Phylum: Arthropoda
- Class: Insecta
- Order: Lepidoptera
- Family: Pterophoridae
- Genus: Hellinsia
- Species: H. papallacta

Binomial name
- Hellinsia papallacta Gielis, 2011

= Hellinsia papallacta =

Species of plume moth

Hellinsia papallacta is a moth of the family Pterophoridae. It is found in Ecuador.

The wingspan is 23 mm. Adults are on wing in December, at an altitude of 2,750 m.
