= Hellinsia probatus =

Scientific classification
- Kingdom: Animalia
- Phylum: Arthropoda
- Class: Insecta
- Order: Lepidoptera
- Family: Pterophoridae
- Genus: Hellinsia
- Species: H. probatus

Binomial name
- Hellinsia probatus (Meyrick, 1938)

Synonyms
- Pterophorus probatus Meyrick 1938

Species of plume moth

Hellinsia probatus is a moth of the family Pterophoridae. It is known from New Guinea.
