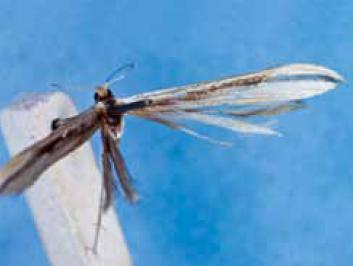

Scientific classification
- Kingdom: Animalia
- Phylum: Arthropoda
- Clade: Pancrustacea
- Class: Insecta
- Order: Lepidoptera
- Family: Pterophoridae
- Genus: Hellinsia
- Species: H. bogotanus

Binomial name
- Hellinsia bogotanus (Felder & Rogenhofer, 1875)

Synonyms
- Mimeseoptilus bogotanus Felder & Rogenhofer, 1875

= Hellinsia bogotanus =

Species of plume moth

Hellinsia bogotanus is a moth of the family Pterophoridae. It is found in Colombia.

The wingspan is 25 mm (1 in).
