= Hellinsia subnotatus =

Scientific classification
- Kingdom: Animalia
- Phylum: Arthropoda
- Class: Insecta
- Order: Lepidoptera
- Family: Pterophoridae
- Genus: Hellinsia
- Species: H. subnotatus

Binomial name
- Hellinsia subnotatus (Walker, 1875)

Synonyms
- Pterophorus subnotatus Walker, 1875

Species of moth

Hellinsia subnotatus is a moth of the family Pterophoridae. It is known from Saint Helena.
