= Hellinsia haplistes =

Scientific classification
- Kingdom: Animalia
- Phylum: Arthropoda
- Class: Insecta
- Order: Lepidoptera
- Family: Pterophoridae
- Genus: Hellinsia
- Species: H. haplistes

Binomial name
- Hellinsia haplistes (Meyrick, 1936)

Synonyms
- Pterophorus haplistes Meyrick, 1936

Species of plume moth

Hellinsia haplistes is a moth of the family Pterophoridae. It is found in Indonesia (Java).
