= Hellinsia biangulata =

Scientific classification
- Kingdom: Animalia
- Phylum: Arthropoda
- Class: Insecta
- Order: Lepidoptera
- Family: Pterophoridae
- Genus: Hellinsia
- Species: H. biangulata

Binomial name
- Hellinsia biangulata Gielis & De Vos, 2007

Species of plume moth

Hellinsia biangulata is a moth of the family Pterophoridae. It is known from West Papua.
