= Hellinsia varioides =

Scientific classification
- Domain: Eukaryota
- Kingdom: Animalia
- Phylum: Arthropoda
- Class: Insecta
- Order: Lepidoptera
- Family: Pterophoridae
- Genus: Hellinsia
- Species: H. varioides

Binomial name
- Hellinsia varioides (McDunnough, 1939)

Synonyms
- Oidaematophora varioides McDunnough, 1939

Species of insect

Hellinsia varioides is a moth of the family Pterophoridae. It is found in North America, including California.

The wingspan is 20–24 mm. The forewings are unicolorous pale greyish white. The costal edge in the basal half is (at times) narrowly brownish. The hindwings are pale greyish with faintly smoky fringes.
