= Hellinsia conscius =

Scientific classification
- Kingdom: Animalia
- Phylum: Arthropoda
- Class: Insecta
- Order: Lepidoptera
- Family: Pterophoridae
- Genus: Hellinsia
- Species: H. conscius

Binomial name
- Hellinsia conscius (Meyrick, 1920)

Synonyms
- Pterophorus conscius Meyrick, 1920

Species of plume moth

Hellinsia conscius is a moth of the family Pterophoridae that is known from Kenya.
