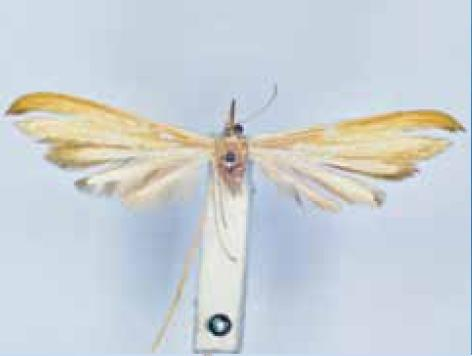

Scientific classification
- Domain: Eukaryota
- Kingdom: Animalia
- Phylum: Arthropoda
- Class: Insecta
- Order: Lepidoptera
- Family: Pterophoridae
- Genus: Hellinsia
- Species: H. emmorus

Binomial name
- Hellinsia emmorus (Walsingham, 1915)

Synonyms
- Pterophorus emmorus Walsingham, 1915

= Hellinsia emmorus =

Species of plume moth

Hellinsia emmorus is a moth of the family Pterophoridae. It is found in Mexico and Guatemala.

The wingspan is 28‑30 mm. The antennae are pale ochreous. The head and front of the thorax are whitish ochreous, with a broad brownish ochreous band across the thorax and tegulae. The forewings are pale ochreous, with a broad brownish ochreous diffused shade commencing at the middle of the base and extending to the apex, a pale line running through it along the middle of the apical lobe, the costa also narrowly pale throughout. The hindwings are shining, pale brassy or golden green.
