= Hellinsia bigoti =

Scientific classification
- Kingdom: Animalia
- Phylum: Arthropoda
- Class: Insecta
- Order: Lepidoptera
- Family: Pterophoridae
- Genus: Hellinsia
- Species: H. bigoti

Binomial name
- Hellinsia bigoti (Rougeot, 1983)

Synonyms
- Leioptilus bigoti Rougeot, 1983

Species of plume moth

Hellinsia bigoti is a moth of the family Pterophoridae. It is known from Ethiopia.
