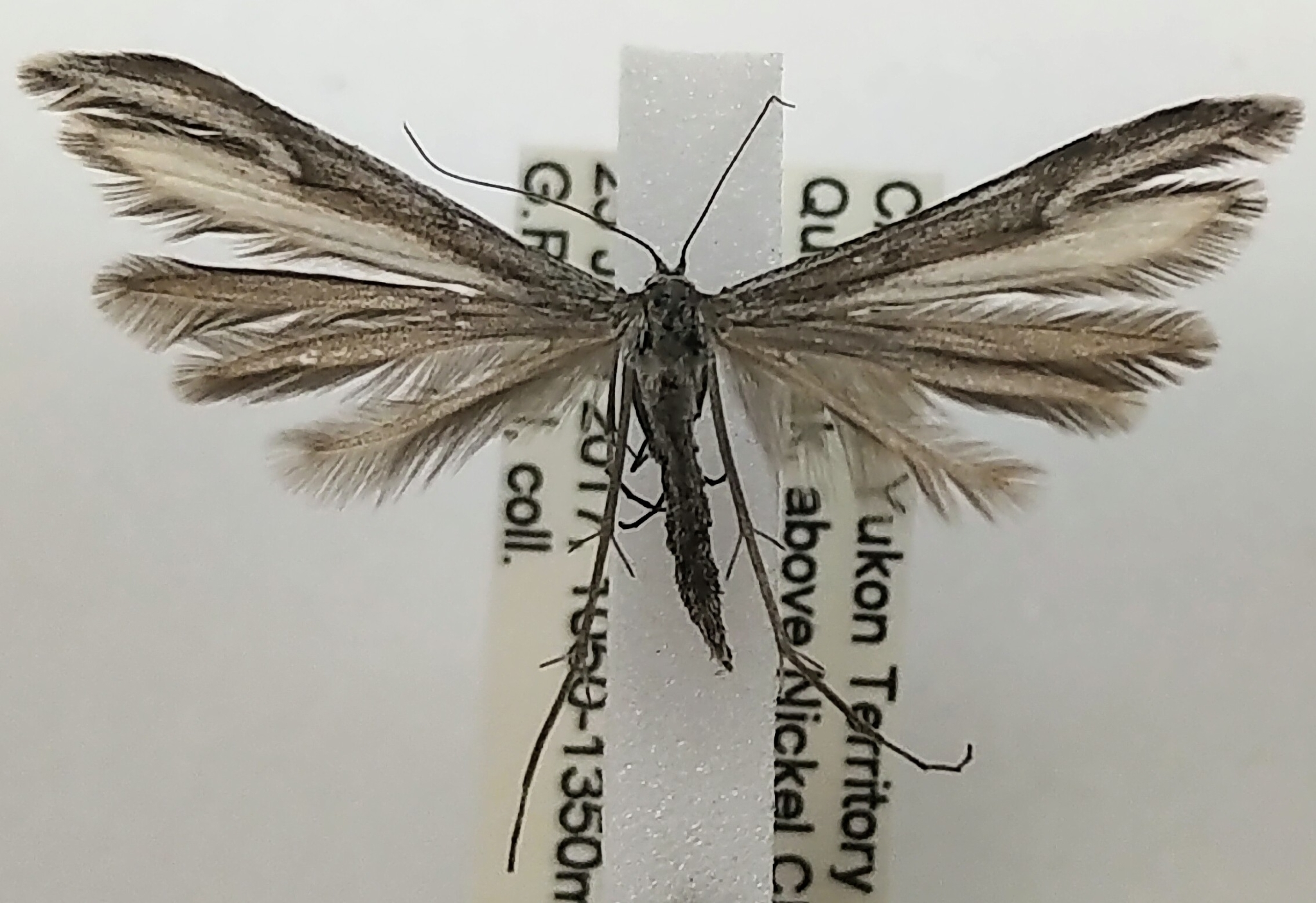

Scientific classification
- Domain: Eukaryota
- Kingdom: Animalia
- Phylum: Arthropoda
- Class: Insecta
- Order: Lepidoptera
- Family: Pterophoridae
- Genus: Hellinsia
- Species: H. albilobata

Binomial name
- Hellinsia albilobata (McDunnough, 1939)

Synonyms
- Oidaematophorus albilobata McDunnough, 1939; Pterophorus albilobata

= Hellinsia albilobata =

Species of plume moth

Hellinsia albilobata is a species of moth in the family Pterophoridae. It is found in North America, including the Northwest Territories.

The wingspan is 25 millimetres (0.98 in).
