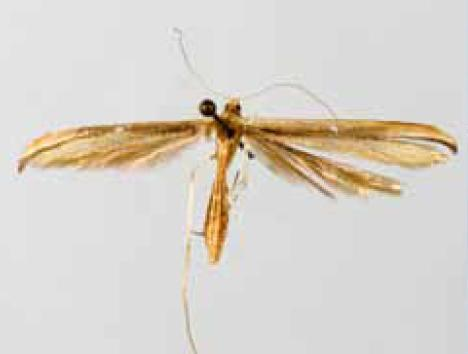

Scientific classification
- Kingdom: Animalia
- Phylum: Arthropoda
- Class: Insecta
- Order: Lepidoptera
- Family: Pterophoridae
- Genus: Hellinsia
- Species: H. nauarches

Binomial name
- Hellinsia nauarches (Meyrick, 1930)

Synonyms
- Pterophorus nauarches Meyrick, 1930

= Hellinsia nauarches =

Species of plume moth

Hellinsia nauarches is a moth of the family Pterophoridae. It is found in Peru, Argentina and Bolivia.

The wingspan is 27 mm. Adults are on wing in March, June, November and December, at an altitude above 2,750 meters.
