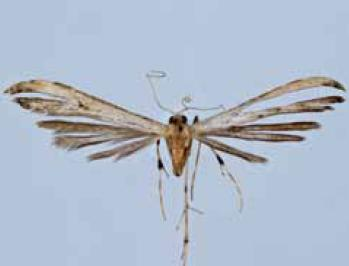

Scientific classification
- Kingdom: Animalia
- Phylum: Arthropoda
- Class: Insecta
- Order: Lepidoptera
- Family: Pterophoridae
- Genus: Hellinsia
- Species: H. zetes

Binomial name
- Hellinsia zetes (Meyrick, 1930)

Synonyms
- Pterophorus zetes Meyrick, 1930; Oidaematophorus zetes

= Hellinsia zetes =

Species of moth

Hellinsia zetes is a moth of the family Pterophoridae that is found in Brazil and Costa Rica.

The wingspan is 23 millimetres (0.91 in). Adults are on wing in May and July.
