= Hellinsia mongolicus =

Scientific classification
- Domain: Eukaryota
- Kingdom: Animalia
- Phylum: Arthropoda
- Class: Insecta
- Order: Lepidoptera
- Family: Pterophoridae
- Genus: Hellinsia
- Species: H. mongolicus

Binomial name
- Hellinsia mongolicus (Zagulajev & Pentschukowskaje, 1972)

Synonyms
- Pterophorus mongolicus Zagulajev & Pentschukowskaje, 1972; Hellinsia mongolica

Species of plume moth

Hellinsia mongolicus is a moth of the family Pterophoridae. It is found in the Russian Far East and Mongolia.
