= Hellinsia costalba =

Scientific classification
- Kingdom: Animalia
- Phylum: Arthropoda
- Class: Insecta
- Order: Lepidoptera
- Family: Pterophoridae
- Genus: Hellinsia
- Species: H. costalba

Binomial name
- Hellinsia costalba Gielis, 1996

Species of plume moth

Hellinsia costalba is a moth of the family Pterophoridae. It is found in Peru.
