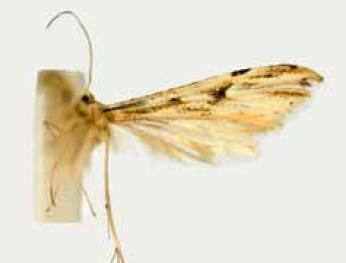

Scientific classification
- Kingdom: Animalia
- Phylum: Arthropoda
- Class: Insecta
- Order: Lepidoptera
- Family: Pterophoridae
- Genus: Hellinsia
- Species: H. pichincha

Binomial name
- Hellinsia pichincha Gielis, 2011

= Hellinsia pichincha =

Species of plume moth

Hellinsia pichincha is a moth of the family Pterophoridae. It is found in Ecuador.

The wingspan is 24 mm. Adults are on wing in November, at an altitude of 2,650 meters.
