= Hellinsia chuncheonensis =

Scientific classification
- Kingdom: Animalia
- Phylum: Arthropoda
- Class: Insecta
- Order: Lepidoptera
- Family: Pterophoridae
- Genus: Hellinsia
- Species: H. chuncheonensis

Binomial name
- Hellinsia chuncheonensis Kim, 2009

Species of plume moth

Hellinsia chuncheonensis is a moth of the family Pterophoridae. It is known from Korea.

The wingspan is 15–16 mm.

== Etymology ==
The specific name refers to the type locality, Chuncheon, of the holotype.
