= Hellinsia sematias =

Scientific classification
- Kingdom: Animalia
- Phylum: Arthropoda
- Class: Insecta
- Order: Lepidoptera
- Family: Pterophoridae
- Genus: Hellinsia
- Species: H. sematias

Binomial name
- Hellinsia sematias (Meyrick, 1907)

Synonyms
- Pterophorus sematias Meyrick, 1907; Oidaematophorus sematias

Species of moth

Hellinsia sematias is a moth of the family Pterophoridae. It is found in Sri Lanka and India.

The wingspan is about 21 mm. The head is ochreous brown, although the lower edge of the face and anterior half of the crown are white. The antennae are grey and the thorax is ochreous whitish. The abdomen is whitish, with traces of pale ochreous streaks, a dorsal series of minute black dots and a rather dark fuscous ventral streak. The forewings are ochreous white, partially suffused with pale ochreous, with a few scattered black scales. The hindwings are rather dark grey.
