= Hellinsia aruna =

Scientific classification
- Kingdom: Animalia
- Phylum: Arthropoda
- Class: Insecta
- Order: Lepidoptera
- Family: Pterophoridae
- Genus: Hellinsia
- Species: H. aruna

Binomial name
- Hellinsia aruna Arenberger, 1991

Species of plume moth

Hellinsia aruna is a moth of the family Pterophoridae. It is found in Nepal.

The wingspan is 16–20 mm. The forewings are yellowish-grey with dark scales. Adults have been recorded from April to August.
