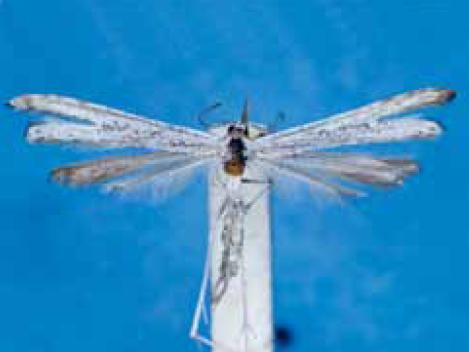

Scientific classification
- Domain: Eukaryota
- Kingdom: Animalia
- Phylum: Arthropoda
- Class: Insecta
- Order: Lepidoptera
- Family: Pterophoridae
- Genus: Hellinsia
- Species: H. sublatus

Binomial name
- Hellinsia sublatus (Walsingham, 1915)

Synonyms
- Pterophorus sublatus Walsingham, 1915

= Hellinsia sublatus =

Species of moth

Hellinsia sublatus is a moth of the family Pterophoridae. It is found in Mexico and Costa Rica.

The wingspan is 17–18 mm. The antennae are pale fawn and the head is white with a pale fawn-brown collar behind. The thorax is white, dusted with pale fawn. The forewings are white, dusted with pale fawn, especially in a subcostal shade from near the base to near the apex, and peppered with a few darker brownish scales. The hindwings are pale brownish grey. Adults are on wing in July and August, at an altitude of 1,800 to 2,450 metres.
