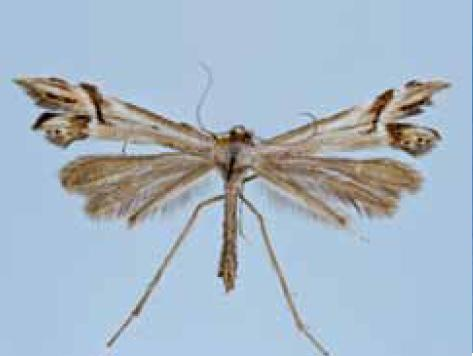

Scientific classification
- Domain: Eukaryota
- Kingdom: Animalia
- Phylum: Arthropoda
- Class: Insecta
- Order: Lepidoptera
- Family: Pterophoridae
- Genus: Hellinsia
- Species: H. siskaellus

Binomial name
- Hellinsia siskaellus (Gielis, 1991)

Synonyms
- Oidaematophorus siskaellus Gielis, 1991

= Hellinsia siskaellus =

Species of moth

Hellinsia siskaellus is a moth of the family Pterophoridae that is found in Argentina (Rio Negro) and Chile.

The wingspan is 21‑23 mm. Adults are on wing in October and from December to January.
