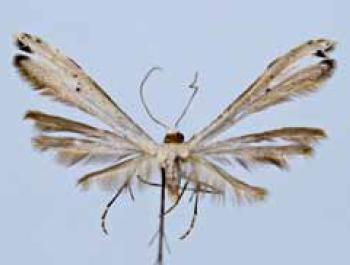

Scientific classification
- Kingdom: Animalia
- Phylum: Arthropoda
- Class: Insecta
- Order: Lepidoptera
- Family: Pterophoridae
- Genus: Hellinsia
- Species: H. obscuricilia

Binomial name
- Hellinsia obscuricilia Arenberger & Wojtusiak, 2001

= Hellinsia obscuricilia =

Species of plume moth

Hellinsia obscuricilia is a moth of the family Pterophoridae that is found in Venezuela and Costa Rica.

The wingspan is about 18 millimetres (0.71 in). The forewings are light yellowish-brown and the hindwings are somewhat darker with greyish-brown fringes. Adults are on wing in April.
