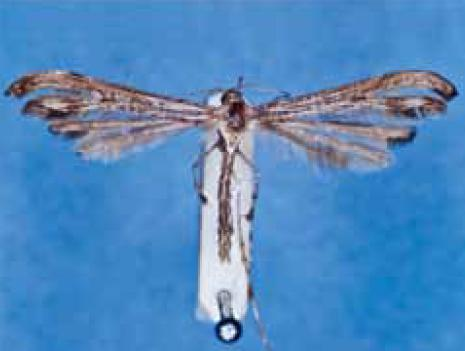

Scientific classification
- Domain: Eukaryota
- Kingdom: Animalia
- Phylum: Arthropoda
- Class: Insecta
- Order: Lepidoptera
- Family: Pterophoridae
- Genus: Hellinsia
- Species: H. phloeochroa

Binomial name
- Hellinsia phloeochroa (Walsingham, 1915)

Synonyms
- Pterophorus phloeochroa Walsingham, 1915

= Hellinsia phloeochroa =

Species of plume moth

Hellinsia phloeochroa is a moth of the family Pterophoridae. It is found in Mexico, Guatemala and Panama.

The wingspan is 23–24 mm. Adults are on wing in February, July and August, at an altitude of 500 to 2,000 meters.
