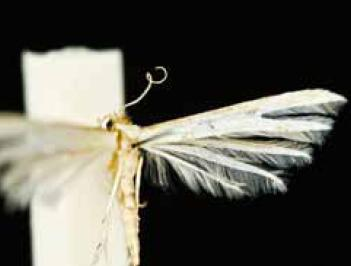

Scientific classification
- Kingdom: Animalia
- Phylum: Arthropoda
- Class: Insecta
- Order: Lepidoptera
- Family: Pterophoridae
- Genus: Hellinsia
- Species: H. angela

Binomial name
- Hellinsia angela Gielis, 2011

= Hellinsia angela =

Species of plume moth

Hellinsia angela is a moth of the family Pterophoridae. It is found in Ecuador.

The wingspan is 19 mm. Adults are on wing in January, at an altitude of 3,500 m.
