= Hellinsia bhutanensis =

Scientific classification
- Kingdom: Animalia
- Phylum: Arthropoda
- Class: Insecta
- Order: Lepidoptera
- Family: Pterophoridae
- Genus: Hellinsia
- Species: H. bhutanensis

Binomial name
- Hellinsia bhutanensis Arenberger, 1995

Species of plume moth

Hellinsia bhutanensis is a moth of the family Pterophoridae. It is found in Bhutan.
