= Hellinsia invidiosus =

Scientific classification
- Kingdom: Animalia
- Phylum: Arthropoda
- Clade: Pancrustacea
- Class: Insecta
- Order: Lepidoptera
- Family: Pterophoridae
- Genus: Hellinsia
- Species: H. invidiosus

Binomial name
- Hellinsia invidiosus (Meyrick, 1911)

Synonyms
- Pterophorus invidiosus Meyrick, 1911

Species of plume moth

Hellinsia invidiosus is a moth of the family Pterophoridae. It is known from South Africa.
