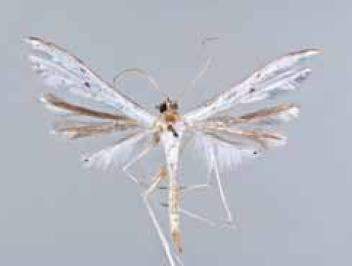

Scientific classification
- Kingdom: Animalia
- Phylum: Arthropoda
- Class: Insecta
- Order: Lepidoptera
- Family: Pterophoridae
- Genus: Hellinsia
- Species: H. hebrus

Binomial name
- Hellinsia hebrus (Meyrick, 1932)

Synonyms
- Pterophorus hebrus Meyrick, 1932

= Hellinsia hebrus =

Species of plume moth

Hellinsia hebrus is a moth of the family Pterophoridae. It is found in Costa Rica.

The wingspan is 23 mm.
