= Hellinsia speideli =

Scientific classification
- Kingdom: Animalia
- Phylum: Arthropoda
- Class: Insecta
- Order: Lepidoptera
- Family: Pterophoridae
- Genus: Hellinsia
- Species: H. speideli

Binomial name
- Hellinsia speideli Gielis, 2003

Species of moth

Hellinsia speideli is a moth of the family Pterophoridae. It is known from Palawan, Samar and Luzon in the Philippines.

The wingspan is 13–15 mm. Adults are on wing in March and April.
