= Hellinsia acuminatus =

Scientific classification
- Kingdom: Animalia
- Phylum: Arthropoda
- Clade: Pancrustacea
- Class: Insecta
- Order: Lepidoptera
- Family: Pterophoridae
- Genus: Hellinsia
- Species: H. acuminatus

Binomial name
- Hellinsia acuminatus (Meyrick, 1920)

Synonyms
- Pterophorus acuminatus Meyrick, 1920

Species of plume moth

Hellinsia acuminatus is a moth of the family Pterophoridae. It has been found in South Africa, Lesotho, and Malawi.
