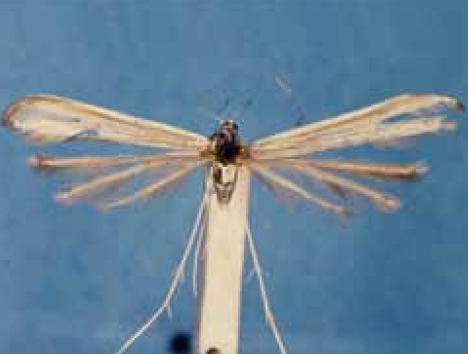

Scientific classification
- Kingdom: Animalia
- Phylum: Arthropoda
- Class: Insecta
- Order: Lepidoptera
- Family: Pterophoridae
- Genus: Hellinsia
- Species: H. agraphodactylus

Binomial name
- Hellinsia agraphodactylus (Walker, 1864)

Synonyms
- Pterophorus agraphodactylus Walker, 1864; Pterophorus aspilodactylus Walker, 1864

= Hellinsia agraphodactylus =

Species of plume moth

Hellinsia agraphodactylus is a moth of the family Pterophoridae. It is found in the Dominican Republic. Records from North America are probably a misidentification.

The wingspan is about 25 mm. The head is whitish in front, touched with brownish ochreous towards the thorax and in front. The antennae are whitish, but browner beneath. The thorax is yellowish white. The forewings are remarkably narrow, dirty white, with a faint yellowish tinge and streaked longitudinally with faint slender lines of brownish grey. There are two slender brownish-grey lines on the dorsal half of the wing, the upper one, coming from the base, passing below the cleft, where it throws off a branch beneath and running along the upper edge of the second lobe to its apex. The lower also comes from the base, and attains the dorsal margin below the base of the cleft. The costa is pale and the cilia is tinged with grey. The hindwings and fringes are pale cinereous (ash-grey). The abdomen and legs are slightly yellowish white. The underside is uniformly pale cinereous, except the costa and the fringes of the anterior lobe within the fissure which are whitish. Adults are on wing in March.
