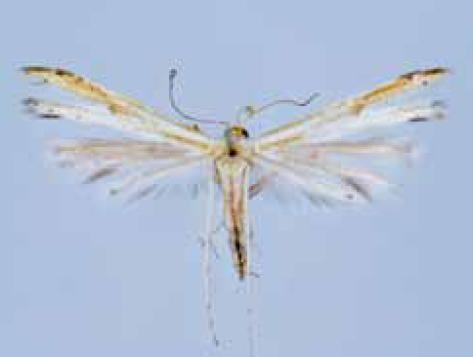

Scientific classification
- Kingdom: Animalia
- Phylum: Arthropoda
- Class: Insecta
- Order: Lepidoptera
- Family: Pterophoridae
- Genus: Hellinsia
- Species: H. mauleicus

Binomial name
- Hellinsia mauleicus (Gielis, 1991)

Synonyms
- Oidaematophorus mauleicus Gielis, 1991

= Hellinsia mauleicus =

Species of plume moth

Hellinsia mauleicus is a moth of the family Pterophoridae. It is found in Chile.

The wingspan is 15‑18 mm. Adults are on wing in October and November.
