= Hellinsia basuto =

Scientific classification
- Kingdom: Animalia
- Phylum: Arthropoda
- Clade: Pancrustacea
- Class: Insecta
- Order: Lepidoptera
- Family: Pterophoridae
- Genus: Hellinsia
- Species: H. basuto

Binomial name
- Hellinsia basuto Kovtunovich & Ustjuzhanin, 2011

Species of plume moth

Hellinsia basuto is a moth of the family Pterophoridae. It is found in Lesotho.
