= Hellinsia shillongi =

Scientific classification
- Kingdom: Animalia
- Phylum: Arthropoda
- Clade: Pancrustacea
- Class: Insecta
- Order: Lepidoptera
- Family: Pterophoridae
- Genus: Hellinsia
- Species: H. shillongi

Binomial name
- Hellinsia shillongi Kovtunovich, 2003

Species of moth

Hellinsia shillongi is a moth of the family Pterophoridae. It is endemic to India and known from Assam.
