= Hellinsia procontias =

Scientific classification
- Domain: Eukaryota
- Kingdom: Animalia
- Phylum: Arthropoda
- Class: Insecta
- Order: Lepidoptera
- Family: Pterophoridae
- Genus: Hellinsia
- Species: H. procontias

Binomial name
- Hellinsia procontias (Meyrick, 1908)

Synonyms
- Pterophorus procontias Meyrick, 1908; Oidaematophorus procontias

Species of plume moth

Hellinsia procontias is a moth of the family Pterophoridae. It is found in Meghalaya (Northeast India), Nepal, and China.

The wingspan is 18–20 mm (0.71–0.79 in). The head is deep ochreous, but the lower edge of the face and anterior half of the crown are white. The antennae are whitish and the thorax is whitish, tinged or sprinkled with pale ochreous. The abdomen is whitish, longitudinally striped with ochreous. The forewings are white, irregularly suffused with pale ochreous. The hindwings are grey, although the third segment is whitish ochreous.
