= Hellinsia contortus =

Scientific classification
- Kingdom: Animalia
- Phylum: Arthropoda
- Clade: Pancrustacea
- Class: Insecta
- Order: Lepidoptera
- Family: Pterophoridae
- Genus: Hellinsia
- Species: H. contortus

Binomial name
- Hellinsia contortus (McDunnough, 1938)

Synonyms
- Oidaematophorus contortus McDunnough, 1938

Species of plume moth

Hellinsia contortus, also known as twisted harpe plume moth, is a moth of the family Pterophoridae. It is endemic to Arizona, the Southwestern United States.

The wingspan is 20–22 mm (0.79–0.87 in).
