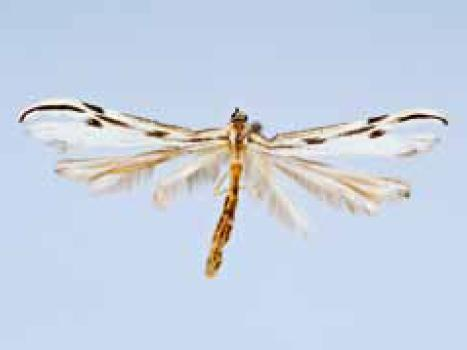

Scientific classification
- Kingdom: Animalia
- Phylum: Arthropoda
- Class: Insecta
- Order: Lepidoptera
- Family: Pterophoridae
- Genus: Hellinsia
- Species: H. hoguei

Binomial name
- Hellinsia hoguei (Gielis, 1996)

Synonyms
- Oidaematophorus hoguei Gielis, 1996

= Hellinsia hoguei =

Species of plume moth

Hellinsia hoguei is a moth of the family Pterophoridae. It is found in Mexico.
