= Hellinsia wamenae =

Scientific classification
- Kingdom: Animalia
- Phylum: Arthropoda
- Class: Insecta
- Order: Lepidoptera
- Family: Pterophoridae
- Genus: Hellinsia
- Species: H. wamenae

Binomial name
- Hellinsia wamenae Gielis, 2003

Synonyms
- Hellinsia agassizi Gielis, 2003

Species of moth

Hellinsia wamenae is a species of moth in the genus Hellinsia, known from Indonesia. Moths in this species take flight in October, and have a wingspan of approximately 16-18 millimetres. The species is named after Wamena, a village whence it was collected.
