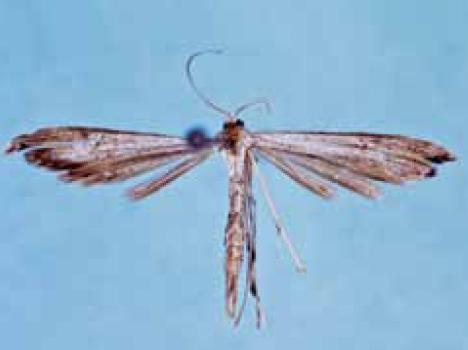

Scientific classification
- Kingdom: Animalia
- Phylum: Arthropoda
- Class: Insecta
- Order: Lepidoptera
- Family: Pterophoridae
- Genus: Hellinsia
- Species: H. cervicalis

Binomial name
- Hellinsia cervicalis (Meyrick, 1932)

Synonyms
- Pterophorus cervicalis Meyrick, 1932

= Hellinsia cervicalis =

Species of plume moth

Hellinsia cervicalis is a moth of the family Pterophoridae. It is found in Bolivia.
