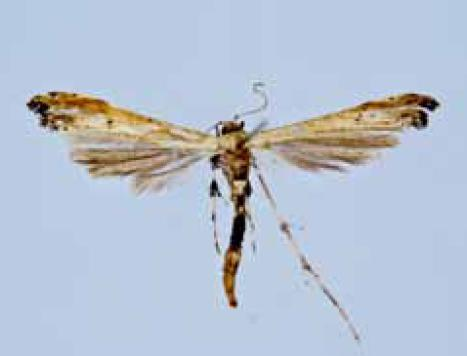

Scientific classification
- Kingdom: Animalia
- Phylum: Arthropoda
- Class: Insecta
- Order: Lepidoptera
- Family: Pterophoridae
- Genus: Hellinsia
- Species: H. barbatus

Binomial name
- Hellinsia barbatus (Gielis, 1996)

Synonyms
- Oidaematophorus barbatus Gielis, 1996

= Hellinsia barbatus =

Species of plume moth

Hellinsia barbatus is a moth of the family Pterophoridae that is found in Colombia and Costa Rica.
