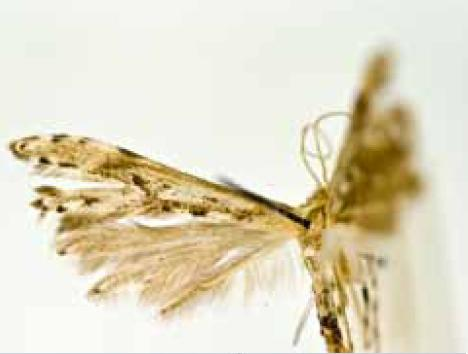

Scientific classification
- Kingdom: Animalia
- Phylum: Arthropoda
- Class: Insecta
- Order: Lepidoptera
- Family: Pterophoridae
- Genus: Hellinsia
- Species: H. paraglochinias

Binomial name
- Hellinsia paraglochinias Gielis, 1996

= Hellinsia paraglochinias =

Species of plume moth

Hellinsia paraglochinias is a moth of the family Pterophoridae. It is found in Ecuador and Peru.

Adults are on wing in April, August and December.
