= Hellinsia sphenites =

Scientific classification
- Kingdom: Animalia
- Phylum: Arthropoda
- Class: Insecta
- Order: Lepidoptera
- Family: Pterophoridae
- Genus: Hellinsia
- Species: H. sphenites

Binomial name
- Hellinsia sphenites (Meyrick, 1913)

Synonyms
- Pterophorus sphenites Meyrick, 1913

Species of moth

Hellinsia sphenites is a moth of the family Pterophoridae. It is known from South Africa.
