= Hellinsia fletcheri =

Scientific classification
- Kingdom: Animalia
- Phylum: Arthropoda
- Class: Insecta
- Order: Lepidoptera
- Family: Pterophoridae
- Genus: Hellinsia
- Species: H. fletcheri

Binomial name
- Hellinsia fletcheri Arenberger, 1992

Species of plume moth

Hellinsia fletcheri is a moth of the family Pterophoridae. It is found in India.
