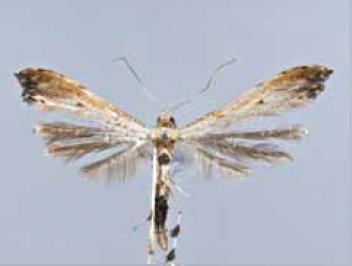

Scientific classification
- Kingdom: Animalia
- Phylum: Arthropoda
- Clade: Pancrustacea
- Class: Insecta
- Order: Lepidoptera
- Family: Pterophoridae
- Genus: Hellinsia
- Species: H. investis

Binomial name
- Hellinsia investis Gielis, 1999

= Hellinsia investis =

Species of plume moth

Hellinsia investis is a moth of the family Pterophoridae. It is found in Costa Rica.

The wingspan is 20 mm. The forewings are grey‑white. The hindwings and fringes are grey. Adults are on wing in April, at an elevation 1,250 m.
