= Hellinsia laciniata =

Scientific classification
- Kingdom: Animalia
- Phylum: Arthropoda
- Class: Insecta
- Order: Lepidoptera
- Family: Pterophoridae
- Genus: Hellinsia
- Species: H. laciniata

Binomial name
- Hellinsia laciniata Arenberger, 1991

Species of plume moth

Hellinsia laciniata is a moth of the family Pterophoridae. It is found in Nepal.

The wingspan is 18–19 mm. The forewings and hindwings are bright yellow. Adults have been recorded from July to August.
