= Hellinsia scholasticus =

Scientific classification
- Kingdom: Animalia
- Phylum: Arthropoda
- Class: Insecta
- Order: Lepidoptera
- Family: Pterophoridae
- Genus: Hellinsia
- Species: H. scholasticus

Binomial name
- Hellinsia scholasticus (Meyrick, 1924)

Synonyms
- Pterophorus scholasticus Meyrick, 1924

Species of plume moth

Hellinsia scholasticus is a moth of the family Pterophoridae. It is found in the Palestinian Territories.
