= Hellinsia excors =

Scientific classification
- Kingdom: Animalia
- Phylum: Arthropoda
- Class: Insecta
- Order: Lepidoptera
- Family: Pterophoridae
- Genus: Hellinsia
- Species: H. excors

Binomial name
- Hellinsia excors (Meyrick, 1930)

Synonyms
- Pterophorus excors Meyrick, 1930

Species of plume moth

Hellinsia excors is a moth of the family Pterophoridae. It is found in Russia (eastern Siberia).
