= Hellinsia ammonias =

Scientific classification
- Kingdom: Animalia
- Phylum: Arthropoda
- Class: Insecta
- Order: Lepidoptera
- Family: Pterophoridae
- Genus: Hellinsia
- Species: H. ammonias

Binomial name
- Hellinsia ammonias (Meyrick, 1909)

Synonyms
- Pterophorus ammonias Meyrick, 1909

Species of plume moth

Hellinsia ammonias is a moth of the family Pterophoridae. It is known from South Africa.
