= Hellinsia albidactylus =

Scientific classification
- Domain: Eukaryota
- Kingdom: Animalia
- Phylum: Arthropoda
- Class: Insecta
- Order: Lepidoptera
- Family: Pterophoridae
- Genus: Hellinsia
- Species: H. albidactylus

Binomial name
- Hellinsia albidactylus (Yano, 1963)

Synonyms
- Oidaematophorus albidactylus Yano, 1963

Species of plume moth

Hellinsia albidactylus is a moth of the family Pterophoridae that is known from Japan (Honshu), Korea, China and Russia.

The wingspan is about 18 millimetres (0.71 in) and the length of the forewings is 10–11 mm.

The larvae feed on Asteraceae species.
