= Hellinsia pseudokorbi =

Scientific classification
- Kingdom: Animalia
- Phylum: Arthropoda
- Clade: Pancrustacea
- Class: Insecta
- Order: Lepidoptera
- Family: Pterophoridae
- Genus: Hellinsia
- Species: H. pseudokorbi

Binomial name
- Hellinsia pseudokorbi (Gibeaux, 1997)

Synonyms
- Oidaematophorus pseudokorbi Gibeaux, 1997

Species of plume moth

Hellinsia pseudokorbi is a moth of the family Pterophoridae.
