= Hellinsia kaiapensis =

Scientific classification
- Kingdom: Animalia
- Phylum: Arthropoda
- Clade: Pancrustacea
- Class: Insecta
- Order: Lepidoptera
- Family: Pterophoridae
- Genus: Hellinsia
- Species: H. kaiapensis

Binomial name
- Hellinsia kaiapensis Gielis, 2003

Species of plume moth

Hellinsia kaiapensis is a species of moth in the genus Hellinsia, known from Papua New Guinea. Moths in this species take flight in November, and have a wingspan of approximately 17 millimetres. The specific name "kaiapensis" refers to Kaiap, the type locality for the species.
