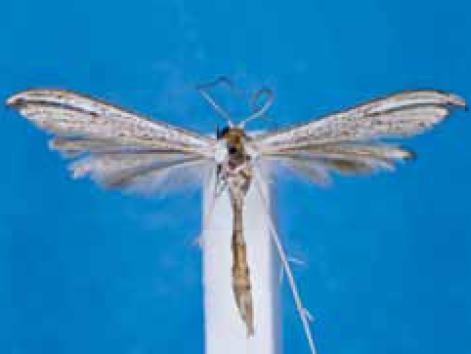

Scientific classification
- Kingdom: Animalia
- Phylum: Arthropoda
- Class: Insecta
- Order: Lepidoptera
- Family: Pterophoridae
- Genus: Hellinsia
- Species: H. oxyntes

Binomial name
- Hellinsia oxyntes (Meyrick, 1908)

Synonyms
- Pterophorus oxyntes Meyrick, 1908

= Hellinsia oxyntes =

Species of plume moth

Hellinsia oxyntes is a moth of the family Pterophoridae that is endemic to Brazil (São Paulo).

The wingspan is 20‑22 mm. The head is ochreous brown, but white between the antennae. These are whitish, with an indistinct dark line above. The thorax is whitish, sometimes more or less tinged with ochreous. The abdomen is whitish ochreous, but the base is sometimes whitish. The forewings are whitish ochreous, partially tinged or sprinkled with brownish. The hindwings are pale ochreous grey.
