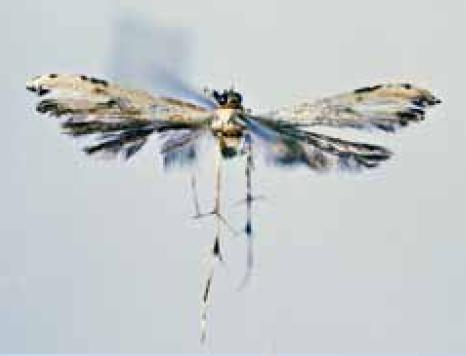

Scientific classification
- Kingdom: Animalia
- Phylum: Arthropoda
- Clade: Pancrustacea
- Class: Insecta
- Order: Lepidoptera
- Family: Pterophoridae
- Genus: Hellinsia
- Species: H. pseudobarbata

Binomial name
- Hellinsia pseudobarbata Gielis, 1999

= Hellinsia pseudobarbata =

Species of plume moth

Hellinsia pseudobarbata is a moth of the family Pterophoridae. It is found in Costa Rica.

The wingspan is 17 mm. The forewings are grey‑brown with black‑brown markings. The hindwings and fringes are brown‑grey. Adults are on wing in October, in mountainous terrain at 1,400 m.
