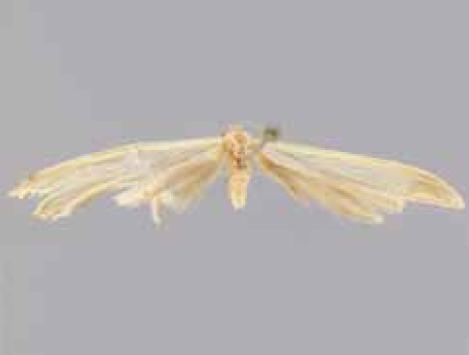

Scientific classification
- Kingdom: Animalia
- Phylum: Arthropoda
- Class: Insecta
- Order: Lepidoptera
- Family: Pterophoridae
- Genus: Hellinsia
- Species: H. paramoi

Binomial name
- Hellinsia paramoi Arenberger & Wojtusiak, 2001

= Hellinsia paramoi =

Species of plume moth

Hellinsia paramoi is a moth of the family Pterophoridae. It is found in Brazil and Venezuela.

The wingspan is about 24–27 millimetres (0.94–1.06 in). The forewings are bone coloured. Adults are on wing in March and September.
