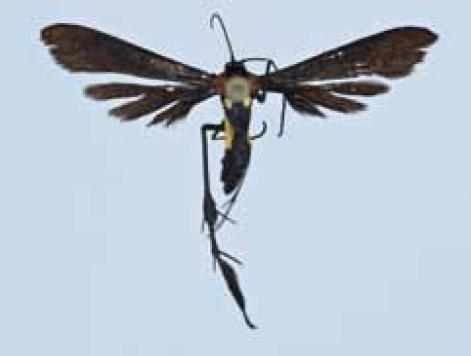

Scientific classification
- Domain: Eukaryota
- Kingdom: Animalia
- Phylum: Arthropoda
- Class: Insecta
- Order: Lepidoptera
- Family: Pterophoridae
- Genus: Hellinsia
- Species: H. chamelai

Binomial name
- Hellinsia chamelai (Gielis, 1992)

Synonyms
- Oidaematophorus chamelai Gielis, 1992

= Hellinsia chamelai =

Species of plume moth

Hellinsia chamelai is a moth in a family Pterophoridae that is found in Mexico and Costa Rica.

The wingspan is 22–25 millimetres (0.87–0.98 in). They have been recorded in July, August, September, October and December in Mexico and in June in Costa Rica. Adults are on wing from June and July to October, and in December.

The hostplant is unknown, but adults have been recorded flying in daytime around flowers of an arboreal Croton species.
