= Hellinsia cinerarius =

Scientific classification
- Kingdom: Animalia
- Phylum: Arthropoda
- Class: Insecta
- Order: Lepidoptera
- Family: Pterophoridae
- Genus: Hellinsia
- Species: H. cinerarius

Binomial name
- Hellinsia cinerarius Philippi, 1864

Synonyms
- Pterophorus cinerarius Philippi, 1864; Oidaematophorus cinerarius

Species of plume moth

Hellinsia cinerarius is a moth of the family Pterophoridae. It is found in Chile.

The forewings are grey white, speckled with small blackish dots between the veins near the costa.
