= Hellinsia adumbratus =

Scientific classification
- Kingdom: Animalia
- Phylum: Arthropoda
- Clade: Pancrustacea
- Class: Insecta
- Order: Lepidoptera
- Family: Pterophoridae
- Genus: Hellinsia
- Species: H. adumbratus

Binomial name
- Hellinsia adumbratus (Walsingham, 1881)

Synonyms
- Aciptilus adumbratus Walsingham, 1881

Species of plume moth

Hellinsia adumbratus is a moth of the family Pterophoridae that is endemic to South Africa.
