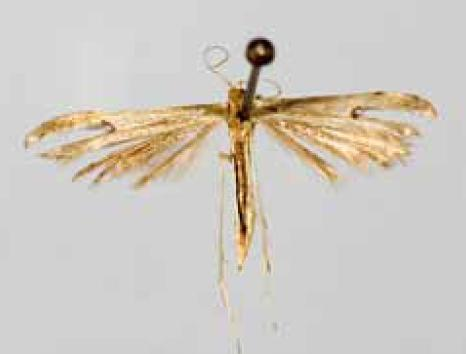

Scientific classification
- Kingdom: Animalia
- Phylum: Arthropoda
- Class: Insecta
- Order: Lepidoptera
- Family: Pterophoridae
- Genus: Hellinsia
- Species: H. stadias

Binomial name
- Hellinsia stadias (Meyrick, 1908)

Synonyms
- Pterophorus stadias Meyrick, 1908

= Hellinsia stadias =

Species of moth

Hellinsia stadias is a moth of the family Pterophoridae. It is found in Brazil.

The wingspan is 20–23 mm. The head is ochreous brown, but white between the antennae. These are ochreous-whitish, with a dark fuscous line. The thorax and abdomen are ochreous-whitish. The forewings are pale whitish-ochreous. The hindwings are pale ochreous-grey. Adults are on wing in October.
