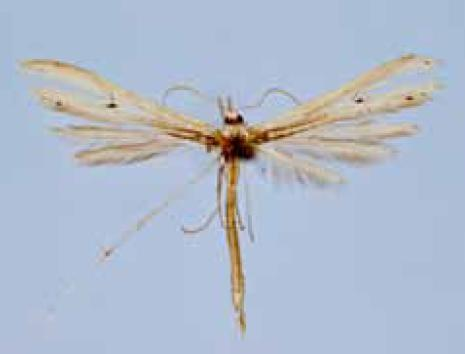

Scientific classification
- Domain: Eukaryota
- Kingdom: Animalia
- Phylum: Arthropoda
- Class: Insecta
- Order: Lepidoptera
- Family: Pterophoridae
- Genus: Hellinsia
- Species: H. basalis

Binomial name
- Hellinsia basalis (Möschler, 1890)

Synonyms
- Oedaematophorus basalis Möschler, 1890; Pterophorus basalis

= Hellinsia basalis =

Species of plume moth

Hellinsia basalis is a moth of the family Pterophoridae. It is found in Puerto Rico.

The wingspan is 25 millimetres (0.98 in). Adults are on wing in April and May.
