= Hellinsia fuscomarginata =

Scientific classification
- Kingdom: Animalia
- Phylum: Arthropoda
- Class: Insecta
- Order: Lepidoptera
- Family: Pterophoridae
- Genus: Hellinsia
- Species: H. fuscomarginata

Binomial name
- Hellinsia fuscomarginata Arenberger, 1991

Species of plume moth

Hellinsia fuscomarginata is a moth of the family Pterophoridae. It is found in Nepal and India (the state of Sikkim and city of Darjeeling in particular).

Its wingspan is 21–24 mm, with bone-yellow forewings. Adults have been recorded between July and August.
