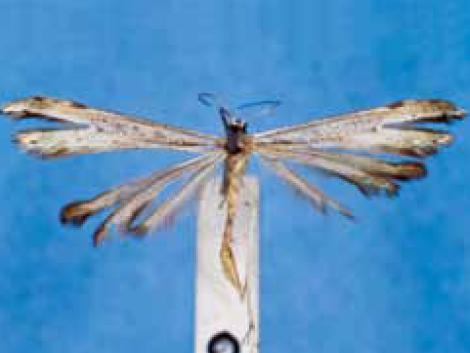

Scientific classification
- Domain: Eukaryota
- Kingdom: Animalia
- Phylum: Arthropoda
- Class: Insecta
- Order: Lepidoptera
- Family: Pterophoridae
- Genus: Hellinsia
- Species: H. phlegmaticus

Binomial name
- Hellinsia phlegmaticus (Walsingham, 1915)

Synonyms
- Pterophorus phlegmaticus Walsingham, 1915; Pterophorus correptus Walsingham, 1915

= Hellinsia phlegmaticus =

Species of plume moth

Hellinsia phlegmaticus is a moth of the family Pterophoridae. It is found in Mexico and Guatemala.

The wingspan is 18 mm. The forewings are pale brownish cinereous, profusely dusted with dark brownish fuscous and whitish scales, the white prevailing along the costa, especially at the base, and at the base of the fissure, up to which point the dark brown dusting is thickly distributed from the base, extending also conspicuously along the fold. The hindwings are pale brownish cinereous and rather shining. Adults are on wing in July, August, October and December.
