= Hellinsia tripunctatus =

Scientific classification
- Kingdom: Animalia
- Phylum: Arthropoda
- Class: Insecta
- Order: Lepidoptera
- Family: Pterophoridae
- Genus: Hellinsia
- Species: H. tripunctatus

Binomial name
- Hellinsia tripunctatus (Walsingham, 1881)

Synonyms
- Aciptilus tripunctatus Walsingham, 1881; Pterophorus serpens Meyrick, 1909; Hellinsia serpens; Pterophorus laqueatus Meyrick, 1913; Hellinsia laqueatus

Species of moth

Hellinsia tripunctatus is a moth of the family Pterophoridae. It is found in South Africa.
