= Hellinsia iraneaus =

Scientific classification
- Domain: Eukaryota
- Kingdom: Animalia
- Phylum: Arthropoda
- Class: Insecta
- Order: Lepidoptera
- Family: Pterophoridae
- Genus: Hellinsia
- Species: H. iraneaus

Binomial name
- Hellinsia iraneaus (Diakonoff, 1952)

Synonyms
- Oidaematophorus iraneaus Diakanoff, 1952

Species of plume moth

Hellinsia iraneaus is a moth of the family Pterophoridae. It is known from New Guinea.
