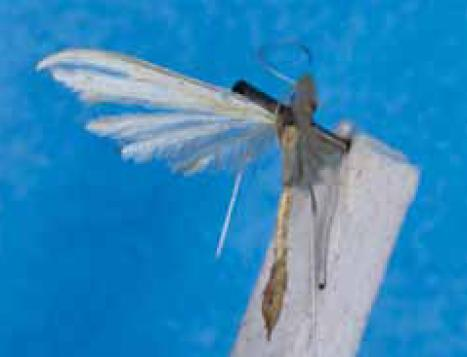

Scientific classification
- Domain: Eukaryota
- Kingdom: Animalia
- Phylum: Arthropoda
- Class: Insecta
- Order: Lepidoptera
- Family: Pterophoridae
- Genus: Hellinsia
- Species: H. mollis

Binomial name
- Hellinsia mollis (Walsingham, 1915)

Synonyms
- Pterophorus mollis Walsingham, 1915

= Hellinsia mollis =

Species of plume moth

Hellinsia mollis is a moth of the family Pterophoridae. It is found in Guatemala, Costa Rica, Mexico (Querétaro) and Panama.

The wingspan is 16–17 mm. Adults are on wing in May and June.
