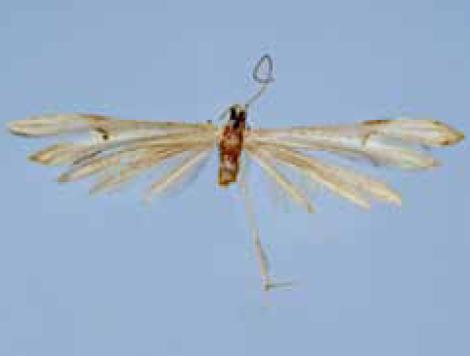

Scientific classification
- Kingdom: Animalia
- Phylum: Arthropoda
- Class: Insecta
- Order: Lepidoptera
- Family: Pterophoridae
- Genus: Hellinsia
- Species: H. angulofuscus

Binomial name
- Hellinsia angulofuscus (Gielis, 1991)

Synonyms
- Oidaematophorus angulofuscus Gielis, 1991

= Hellinsia angulofuscus =

Species of plume moth

Hellinsia angulofuscus is a moth of the family Pterophoridae. It is found in Argentina (Salta), Brazil (São Paulo) and Paraguay (Asuncion).

The wingspan is 16‑17 mm. Adults are on wing in April and June.

The larvae feed on Wulffia baccata.
