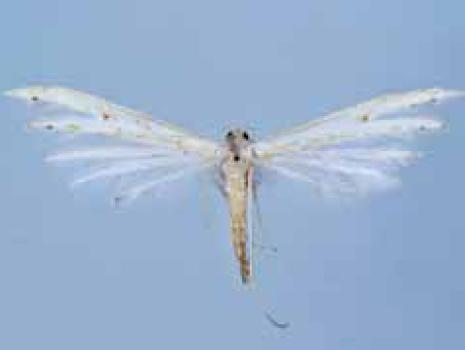

Scientific classification
- Kingdom: Animalia
- Phylum: Arthropoda
- Clade: Pancrustacea
- Class: Insecta
- Order: Lepidoptera
- Family: Pterophoridae
- Genus: Hellinsia
- Species: H. hololeucos

Binomial name
- Hellinsia hololeucos (Zeller, 1874)

Synonyms
- Leioptilus hololeucos Zeller, 1874; Oidaematophorus hololeucos; Hellinsia hololeucus

= Hellinsia hololeucos =

Species of plume moth

Hellinsia hololeucos is a moth of the family Pterophoridae. It is found in Chile.

The wingspan is 15‑19 mm. Adults are on wing in February and from October to December.

The hostplant is unknown, but adults have been recorded flying around Salvia species.
