= Hellinsia sichuana =

Scientific classification
- Kingdom: Animalia
- Phylum: Arthropoda
- Clade: Pancrustacea
- Class: Insecta
- Order: Lepidoptera
- Family: Pterophoridae
- Genus: Hellinsia
- Species: H. sichuana

Binomial name
- Hellinsia sichuana Arenberger, 1992

Species of moth

Hellinsia sichuana is a species of moth in the family Pterophoridae. It is found in south-western China (Sichuan).
