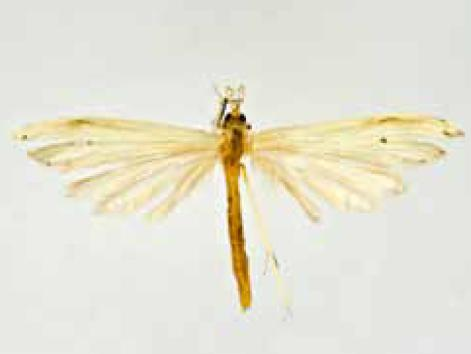

Scientific classification
- Kingdom: Animalia
- Phylum: Arthropoda
- Clade: Pancrustacea
- Class: Insecta
- Order: Lepidoptera
- Family: Pterophoridae
- Genus: Hellinsia
- Species: H. lenis

Binomial name
- Hellinsia lenis (Zeller, 1877)

Synonyms
- Leioptilus lenis Zeller, 1877

= Hellinsia lenis =

Species of plume moth

Hellinsia lenis is a moth of the family Pterophoridae. It is found in Colombia and Ecuador.

The wingspan is 17‑19 mm. Adults are on wing in December.
