= Hellinsia harpactes =

Scientific classification
- Kingdom: Animalia
- Phylum: Arthropoda
- Class: Insecta
- Order: Lepidoptera
- Family: Pterophoridae
- Genus: Hellinsia
- Species: H. harpactes

Binomial name
- Hellinsia harpactes (Meyrick, 1908)

Synonyms
- Pterophorus harpactes Meyrick, 1908

Species of plume moth

Hellinsia harpactes is a moth of the family Pterophoridae. It is found in Nepal and India (Assam).
