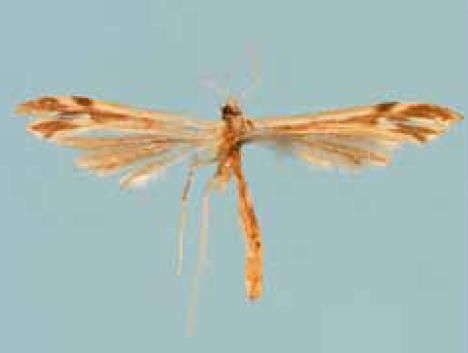

Scientific classification
- Kingdom: Animalia
- Phylum: Arthropoda
- Clade: Pancrustacea
- Class: Insecta
- Order: Lepidoptera
- Family: Pterophoridae
- Genus: Hellinsia
- Species: H. pelospilus

Binomial name
- Hellinsia pelospilus (Zeller, 1877)

Synonyms
- Leioptilus pelospilus Zeller, 1877; Oidaematophorus pelospilus; Pterophorus salticola Meyrick, 1913; Hellinsia salticola; Pterophorus pelospilus Zeller, 1877

= Hellinsia pelospilus =

Species of plume moth

Hellinsia pelospilus is a moth of the family Pterophoridae that can be found in Peru and Ecuador.
