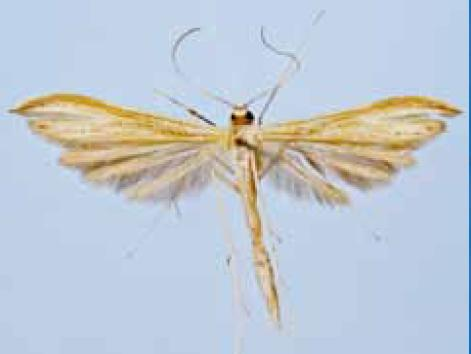

Scientific classification
- Kingdom: Animalia
- Phylum: Arthropoda
- Class: Insecta
- Order: Lepidoptera
- Family: Pterophoridae
- Genus: Hellinsia
- Species: H. glaphyrotes

Binomial name
- Hellinsia glaphyrotes (Meyrick, 1908)

Synonyms
- Pterophorus glaphyrotes Meyrick, 1908

= Hellinsia glaphyrotes =

Species of plume moth

Hellinsia glaphyrotes is a moth of the family Pterophoridae. It is found in Brazil, Argentina, Ecuador, Paraguay and Peru.

The wingspan is 17–23 mm. The head is light ochreous-brown, but ochreous-white between the antennae. These and the thorax are ochreous-whitish. The abdomen is whitish, with more or less indicated fine ochreous dorsal and other lines. The hindwings are rather light grey. Adults are on wing from January to May and from October to December.

The larvae feed on Wulffia barcata.
