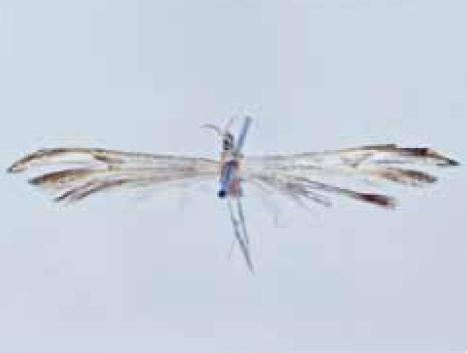

Scientific classification
- Kingdom: Animalia
- Phylum: Arthropoda
- Class: Insecta
- Order: Lepidoptera
- Family: Pterophoridae
- Genus: Hellinsia
- Species: H. fissuralba

Binomial name
- Hellinsia fissuralba Gielis, 1996

= Hellinsia fissuralba =

Species of plume moth

Hellinsia fissuralba is a moth of the family Pterophoridae. It is found in Mexico and Peru.

Adults are on wing in July and August.
