= Hellinsia integratus =

Scientific classification
- Kingdom: Animalia
- Phylum: Arthropoda
- Class: Insecta
- Order: Lepidoptera
- Family: Pterophoridae
- Genus: Hellinsia
- Species: H. integratus

Binomial name
- Hellinsia integratus (Meyrick, 1913)

Synonyms
- Pterophorus integratus Meyrick, 1913

Species of plume moth

Hellinsia integratus is a moth of the family Pterophoridae. It is found in North America.
