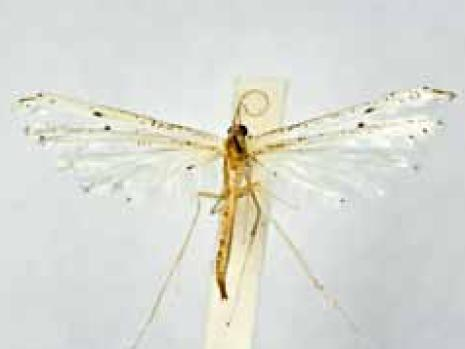

Scientific classification
- Kingdom: Animalia
- Phylum: Arthropoda
- Class: Insecta
- Order: Lepidoptera
- Family: Pterophoridae
- Genus: Hellinsia
- Species: H. argutus

Binomial name
- Hellinsia argutus (Meyrick, 1926)

Synonyms
- Pterophorus argutus Meyrick, 1926; Oidaematophorus argutus; Pterophorus chionophanes Meyrick, 1930; Hellinsia chionophanes; Oidaematophorus chionoptila T.B. Fletcher, 1940; Hellinsia chionoptila

= Hellinsia argutus =

Species of plume moth

Hellinsia argutus is a moth of the family Pterophoridae. It is found in Colombia, Ecuador and Peru.

The wingspan is 24–27 millimetres (0.94–1.06 in). Adults are on wing in April, May, June and October, at altitudes from 2,000 to 3,450 m.
