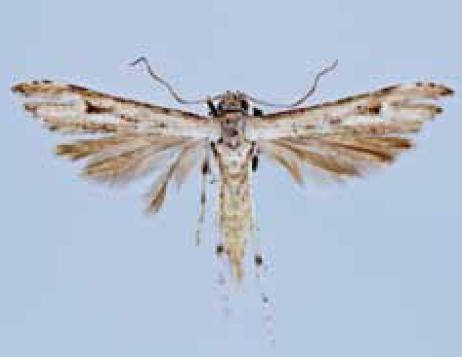

Scientific classification
- Kingdom: Animalia
- Phylum: Arthropoda
- Class: Insecta
- Order: Lepidoptera
- Family: Pterophoridae
- Genus: Hellinsia
- Species: H. nephogenes

Binomial name
- Hellinsia nephogenes (Meyrick, 1926)

Synonyms
- Pterophorus nephogenes Meyrick, 1926; Oidaematophorus nephogenes

= Hellinsia nephogenes =

Species of plume moth

Hellinsia nephogenes is a moth of the family Pterophoridae. It is found on the Galapagos Islands (Floreana, Isabela and Santa Cruz).

== Description ==
The wingspan is 14–17 mm.

== Ecology ==
The larvae feed on Scalesia affinis.

== Life cycle ==
Adults have been recorded in March, July, August and December. There are probably two generations per year.
