= Hellinsia tariensis =

Scientific classification
- Kingdom: Animalia
- Phylum: Arthropoda
- Clade: Pancrustacea
- Class: Insecta
- Order: Lepidoptera
- Family: Pterophoridae
- Genus: Hellinsia
- Species: H. tariensis

Binomial name
- Hellinsia tariensis Gielis, 2003

Species of moth

Hellinsia tariensis is a species of moth in the genus Hellinsia, known from Papua New Guinea. Moths in this species take flight in November, and have a wingspan of approximately 15-17 millimetres. The specific name refers to Tari, the village whence it was collected.
