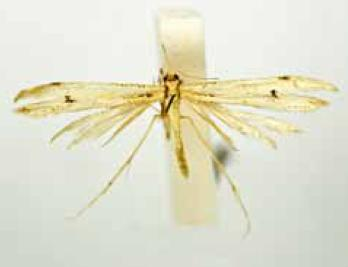

Scientific classification
- Kingdom: Animalia
- Phylum: Arthropoda
- Class: Insecta
- Order: Lepidoptera
- Family: Pterophoridae
- Genus: Hellinsia
- Species: H. maldonadoica

Binomial name
- Hellinsia maldonadoica Gielis, 2011

= Hellinsia maldonadoica =

Species of plume moth

Hellinsia maldonadoica is a moth of the family Pterophoridae. It is found in Ecuador.

The wingspan is 21 mm. Adults are on wing in January, at an altitude of 2,850 meters.
