= Hellinsia aegyptiacus =

Scientific classification
- Kingdom: Animalia
- Phylum: Arthropoda
- Clade: Pancrustacea
- Class: Insecta
- Order: Lepidoptera
- Family: Pterophoridae
- Genus: Hellinsia
- Species: H. aegyptiacus

Binomial name
- Hellinsia aegyptiacus (Rebel, 1914)

Synonyms
- Pterophorus aegyptiacus Rebel, 1914

Species of plume moth

Hellinsia aegyptiacus is a moth of the family Pterophoridae. It is known from Egypt.
