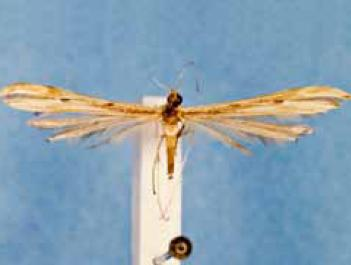

Scientific classification
- Kingdom: Animalia
- Phylum: Arthropoda
- Class: Insecta
- Order: Lepidoptera
- Family: Pterophoridae
- Genus: Hellinsia
- Species: H. tepidus

Binomial name
- Hellinsia tepidus (Meyrick, 1922)

Synonyms
- Pterophorus tepidus Meyrick, 1922; Oidaematophorus tepidus

= Hellinsia tepidus =

Species of moth

Hellinsia tepidus is a moth of the family Pterophoridae that is endemic to Costa Rica.

The wingspan is 24 millimetres (0.94 in).
