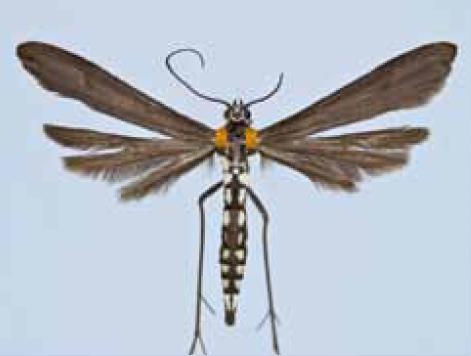

Scientific classification
- Kingdom: Animalia
- Phylum: Arthropoda
- Class: Insecta
- Order: Lepidoptera
- Family: Pterophoridae
- Genus: Hellinsia
- Species: H. paraochracealis

Binomial name
- Hellinsia paraochracealis (Gielis, 1992)

Synonyms
- Oidaemathophora paraochracealis Gielis, 1992

= Hellinsia paraochracealis =

Species of plume moth

Hellinsia paraochracealis is a moth of the family Pterophoridae. It is found in Brazil (Distrito Federal).

The wingspan is 24‑26 mm. Adults have broad, uniformly black wings with a purplish iridescence. Adults are on wing in July and August.
