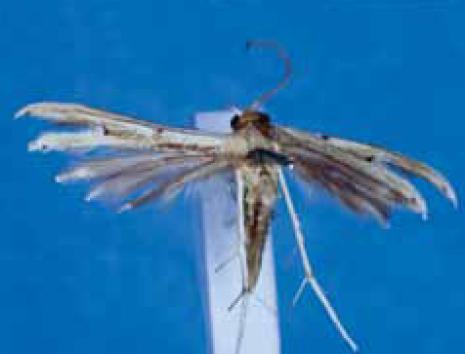

Scientific classification
- Kingdom: Animalia
- Phylum: Arthropoda
- Class: Insecta
- Order: Lepidoptera
- Family: Pterophoridae
- Genus: Hellinsia
- Species: H. palmatus

Binomial name
- Hellinsia palmatus (Meyrick, 1908)

Synonyms
- Pterophorus palmatus Meyrick, 1908

= Hellinsia palmatus =

Species of plume moth

Hellinsia palmatus is a moth of the family Pterophoridae. It is found in Brazil.

The wingspan is 18‑19 mm.
