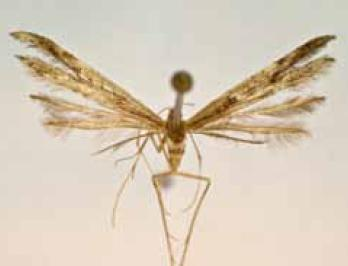

Scientific classification
- Kingdom: Animalia
- Phylum: Arthropoda
- Class: Insecta
- Order: Lepidoptera
- Family: Pterophoridae
- Genus: Hellinsia
- Species: H. coquimboicus

Binomial name
- Hellinsia coquimboicus (Gielis, 1991)

Synonyms
- Oidaematophorus coquimboicus Gielis, 1991

= Hellinsia coquimboicus =

Species of plume moth

Hellinsia coquimboicus is a moth of the family Pterophoridae. It is found in Chile.

The wingspan is 19 mm. Adults are on wing in November.
