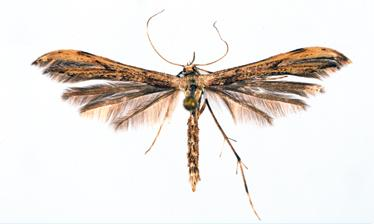

Scientific classification
- Kingdom: Animalia
- Phylum: Arthropoda
- Class: Insecta
- Order: Lepidoptera
- Family: Pterophoridae
- Tribe: Oidaematophorini
- Genus: Hellinsia; Tutt, 1905

Synonyms
- Leioptilus Wallengren, 1862 (homonym); Utuca Walker, 1864; Lioptilus Zeller, 1867 (emendation, homonym of Lioptilus Cabanis, 1850); Paulianilus Gibeaux, 1994

= Hellinsia =

Plume moth genus

Hellinsia is a genus of moths in the family Pterophoridae. It was created by J.W. Tutt in honour of the entomologist John Hellins.

== Species ==
The genus contains the following species:

- Hellinsia acuminatus (Meyrick, 1920)
- Hellinsia adumbratus (Walsingham, 1881)
- Hellinsia aegyptiacus (Rebel, 1914)
- Hellinsia aethiopicus (Amsel, 1963)
- Hellinsia agraphodactylus (Walker, 1864)
- Hellinsia aguilerai Gielis, 2011
- Hellinsia aistleitneri Arenberger, 2006
- Hellinsia albidactylus (Yano, 1963)
- Hellinsia albilobata (McDunnough, 1939)
- Hellinsia aldabrensis (T.B. Fletcher, 1910)
- Hellinsia alfaroi Gielis, 2011
- Hellinsia ammonias (Meyrick, 1909)
- Hellinsia angela Gielis, 2011
- Hellinsia angulofuscus (Gielis, 1991)
- Hellinsia ares (Barnes & Lindsey, 1921)
- Hellinsia argutus
- Hellinsia arion (Barnes & Lindsey, 1921)
- Hellinsia aruna Arenberger, 1991
- Hellinsia auster (Barnes & Lindsey, 1921)
- Hellinsia balanotes (Meyrick, 1908) (sometimes placed in Oidaematophorus)
- Hellinsia barbatus
- Hellinsia basalis (Möschler, 1890)
- Hellinsia basuto Kovtunovich & Ustjuzhanin, 2011
- Hellinsia batallonica
- Hellinsia bawana Arenberger, 2010
- Hellinsia benalcazari Gielis, 2011
- Hellinsia beneficus (Yano & Heppner, 1983)
- Hellinsia bengtssoni Gielis, 2009
- Hellinsia betsiae (Gielis, 1991)
- Hellinsia bhutanensis
- Hellinsia biangulata Gielis & de Vos, 2006
- Hellinsia bigoti (Rougeot, 1983)
- Hellinsia bogotanus (Felder & Rogenhofer, 1875)
- Hellinsia brandbergi Arenberger, 2004
- Hellinsia cadmus (Barnes & Lindsey, 1921)
- Hellinsia cajanuma Gielis, 2011
- Hellinsia calais (Meyrick, 1930)
- Hellinsia callidus (Meyrick, 1913)
- Hellinsia canari Gielis, 2011
- Hellinsia caras Gielis, 2011
- Hellinsia carphodactoides Gielis, 2003
- Hellinsia carphodactyla (Hübner, 1813)
- Hellinsia caudelli (Dyar, 1903)
- Hellinsia cervicalis (Meyrick, 1932)
- Hellinsia chamelai (Gielis, 1992)
- Hellinsia chlorias (Meyrick, 1908)
- Hellinsia chrysocomae (Ragonot, 1875)
- Hellinsia chuncheonensis Kim, 2009
- Hellinsia cinerarius (Philippi, 1864)
- Hellinsia citrites (Meyrick, 1908)
- Hellinsia cochise (Barnes & Lindsey, 1921)
- Hellinsia colubratus (Meyrick, 1909)
- Hellinsia confusus (Braun, 1930)
- Hellinsia conjunctus (Zeller, 1877)
- Hellinsia conscius (Meyrick, 1920)
- Hellinsia contortus (McDunnough, 1938)
- Hellinsia conyzae (Gibeaux, 1994)
- Hellinsia coquimboicus (Gielis, 1991)
- Hellinsia corvus (Barnes & Lindsey, 1921)
- Hellinsia costalba
- Hellinsia costatus (Barnes & Lindsey, 1921)
- Hellinsia crescens (Meyrick, 1926)
- Hellinsia cristobalis (B. Landry & Gielis, 1992)
- Hellinsia cuculla Gielis, 2011
- Hellinsia cyrtoacanthaus Kim, 2009
- Hellinsia delospilus (Meyrick, 1921)
- Hellinsia devriesi (B. Landry & Gielis, 1992)
- Hellinsia didactylites (Ström, 1783)
- Hellinsia discors (Meyrick, 1913)
- Hellinsia distinctus (Herrich-Schäffer, 1855)
- Hellinsia elhacha
- Hellinsia elliottii (Fernald, 1893)
- Hellinsia emmelinoida Gielis, 2008
- Hellinsia emmorus (Walsingham, 1915)
- Hellinsia epileucus (Walsingham, 1915)
- Hellinsia eros (Barnes & Lindsey, 1921)
- Hellinsia excors (Meyrick, 1930)
- Hellinsia falsus (Barnes & Lindsey, 1921)
- Hellinsia fieldi (Wright, 1921)
- Hellinsia fishii (Fernald, 1893)
- Hellinsia fissuralba
- Hellinsia fissuripuncta
- Hellinsia fletcheri
- Hellinsia fumiventris (Zeller, 1877)
- Hellinsia furfurosus (Meyrick, 1911)
- Hellinsia fusciciliatus (Zeller, 1877)
- Hellinsia fuscomarginata
- Hellinsia fuscotransversa
- Hellinsia glaphyrotes (Meyrick, 1908)
- Hellinsia glenni (Cashatt, 1972)
- Hellinsia glochinias (Meyrick, 1908)
- Hellinsia grandaevus (Meyrick, 1931)
- Hellinsia grandis (Fish, 1881)
- Hellinsia gratiosus (Fish, 1881)
- Hellinsia gypsotes (Meyrick, 1937)
- Hellinsia habecki Matthews, 2010
- Hellinsia haplistes (Meyrick, 1936)
- Hellinsia harpactes (Meyrick, 1908)
- Hellinsia hebrus (Meyrick, 1932)
- Hellinsia helianthi (Walsingham, 1880)
- Hellinsia hoguei
- Hellinsia hololeucos (Zeller, 1874)
- Hellinsia homodactylus (Walker, 1864)
- Hellinsia huayna Gielis, 2011
- Hellinsia ignifugax (Walsingham, 1915)
- Hellinsia illutus (Meyrick, 1917)
- Hellinsia improbus
- Hellinsia inconditus
- Hellinsia innocens
- Hellinsia inquinatus
- Hellinsia integratus
- Hellinsia inulae
- Hellinsia inulaevorus (Gibeaux, 1989)
- Hellinsia investis
- Hellinsia invidiosus
- Hellinsia iobates (Barnes & Lindsey, 1921)
- Hellinsia iraneaus (Diakonoff, 1952)
- Hellinsia ishiyamanus
- Hellinsia kaiapensis Gielis, 2003
- Hellinsia katangae Gielis, 2009
- Hellinsia kellicottii (Fish, 1881)
- Hellinsia kuwayamai
- Hellinsia laciniata
- Hellinsia lacteodactylus
- Hellinsia lacteolus
- Hellinsia lenis
- Hellinsia lienigianus
- Hellinsia linus (Barnes & Lindsey, 1921)
- Hellinsia logistes
- Hellinsia longifrons
- Hellinsia lumbaquia Gielis, 2011
- Hellinsia luteolus (Barnes & Lindsey, 1921)
- Hellinsia madecasseus (Bigot, 1964)
- Hellinsia magnus Gielis, 2011
- Hellinsia maldonadoica Gielis, 2011
- Hellinsia malesanus
- Hellinsia mallecoicus
- Hellinsia mauleicus
- Hellinsia medius (Barnes & Lindsey, 1921)
- Hellinsia mesoleucus (Diakonoff, 1952)
- Hellinsia milleri Gielis, 2011
- Hellinsia mizar (Barnes & Lindsey, 1921)
- Hellinsia mollis
- Hellinsia mongolicus
- Hellinsia monserrate
- Hellinsia monteverda
- Hellinsia montezerpae
- Hellinsia montufari Gielis, 2011
- Hellinsia morenoi Gielis, 2011
- Hellinsia nauarches
- Hellinsia nephogenes
- Hellinsia nigricalcarius
- Hellinsia nigridactylus
- Hellinsia nigrosparsus
- Hellinsia nivalis
- Hellinsia nodipes
- Hellinsia nuwara
- Hellinsia obandoi
- Hellinsia obscuricilia
- Hellinsia ochracealis
- Hellinsia ochricostatus
- Hellinsia orellanai Gielis, 2011
- Hellinsia ossipellis
- Hellinsia osteodactyla (Zeller, 1841) Type species
- Hellinsia oxyntes
- Hellinsia paccha Gielis, 2011
- Hellinsia paleaceus
- Hellinsia pallens Gielis, 2011
- Hellinsia palmatus
- Hellinsia pan (Barnes & Lindsey, 1921)
- Hellinsia papallacta Gielis, 2011
- Hellinsia paraglochinias
- Hellinsia paramoi
- Hellinsia paraochracealis
- Hellinsia pectodactyla
- Hellinsia pelospilus
- Hellinsia perditus (Barnes & Lindsey, 1921)
- Hellinsia phlegmaticus
- Hellinsia phloeochroa
- Hellinsia phoebus (Barnes & Lindsey, 1921)
- Hellinsia pichincha Gielis, 2011
- Hellinsia pizarroi Gielis, 2011
- Hellinsia pollux (Barnes & Lindsey, 1921)
- Hellinsia postnigrata Gielis, 2011
- Hellinsia powelli
- Hellinsia praealtus
- Hellinsia praenigratus
- Hellinsia probatus
- Hellinsia procontias
- Hellinsia pseudobarbata
- Hellinsia pseudokorbi
- Hellinsia punctata Gielis, 2009
- Hellinsia puruha Gielis, 2011
- Hellinsia quitus Gielis, 2011
- Hellinsia rigidus
- Hellinsia ruminahuii Gielis, 2011
- Hellinsia scholasticus
- Hellinsia scribarius
- Hellinsia scripta
- Hellinsia sematias
- Hellinsia shillongi Kovtunovich, 2003
- Hellinsia shyri Gielis, 2011
- Hellinsia sichuana
- Hellinsia simplicissimus
- Hellinsia siniaevi Kovtunovich, 2003
- Hellinsia siskaellus
- Hellinsia socorroica
- Hellinsia solanoi
- Hellinsia sordidatus
- Hellinsia speideli Gielis, 2003
- Hellinsia spermatias
- Hellinsia sphenites
- Hellinsia spiculibursa
- Hellinsia stadias
- Hellinsia sublatus
- Hellinsia subnotatus
- Hellinsia subochraceus
- Hellinsia sucrei Gielis, 2011
- Hellinsia sulphureodactylus
- Hellinsia surinamensis
- Hellinsia tariensis Gielis, 2003
- Hellinsia tephradactyla (Hübner, 1813)
- Hellinsia tepidus
- Hellinsia tetraonipennis
- Hellinsia thor
- Hellinsia thoracica
- Hellinsia tinctus
- Hellinsia triadias
- Hellinsia tripunctatus (=Hellinsia serpens)
- Hellinsia triton (Barnes & Lindsey, 1921)
- Hellinsia tupaci Gielis, 2011
- Hellinsia umrani Kovtunovich, 2003
- Hellinsia unicolor
- Hellinsia urbanus
- Hellinsia varioides
- Hellinsia varius (Barnes & Lindsey, 1921)
- Hellinsia venapunctus (Barnes & Lindsey, 1921)
- Hellinsia wamenae Gielis, 2003
- Hellinsia wrangeliensis
- Hellinsia zetes

== Former species ==
- Hellinsia ecstaticus (Meyrick, 1932)
- Hellinsia pacifica
- Hellinsia purus
