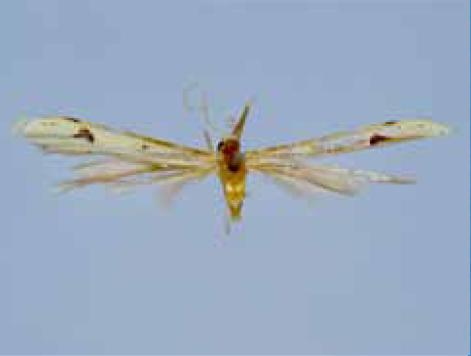

Scientific classification
- Kingdom: Animalia
- Phylum: Arthropoda
- Clade: Pancrustacea
- Class: Insecta
- Order: Lepidoptera
- Family: Pterophoridae
- Genus: Hellinsia
- Species: H. scripta

Binomial name
- Hellinsia scripta Gielis, 1999

= Hellinsia scripta =

Species of moth

Hellinsia scripta is a moth of the family Pterophoridae. It is found in Costa Rica.

Adults are on wing in February and July.
