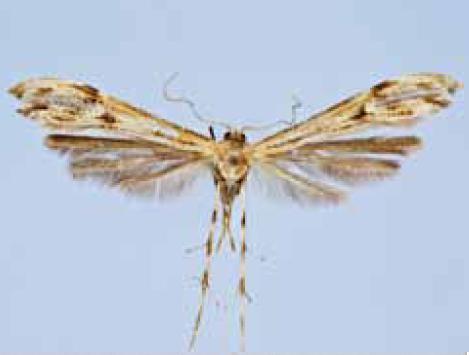

Scientific classification
- Kingdom: Animalia
- Phylum: Arthropoda
- Class: Insecta
- Order: Lepidoptera
- Family: Pterophoridae
- Genus: Hellinsia
- Species: H. huayna

Binomial name
- Hellinsia huayna Gielis, 2011

= Hellinsia huayna =

Species of plume moth

Hellinsia huayna is a moth of the family Pterophoridae. It is found in Ecuador.

The wingspan is 15 mm. Adults are on wing in September and October, at an altitude of 1,700 meters.
