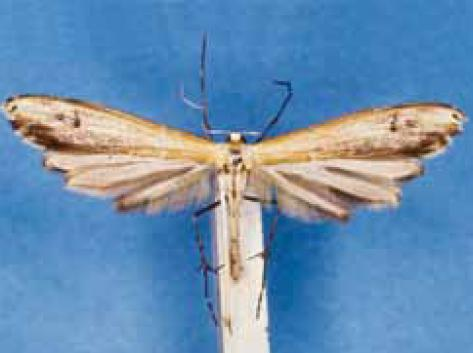

Scientific classification
- Kingdom: Animalia
- Phylum: Arthropoda
- Clade: Pancrustacea
- Class: Insecta
- Order: Lepidoptera
- Family: Pterophoridae
- Genus: Hellinsia
- Species: H. nigricalcarius

Binomial name
- Hellinsia nigricalcarius (Gielis, 1996)

Synonyms
- Oidaematophorus nigricalcarius Gielis, 1996

= Hellinsia nigricalcarius =

Species of plume moth

Hellinsia nigricalcarius is a species of plume moth in the family Pterophoridae. It is found in Colombia.
