= Hellinsia conyzae =

Scientific classification
- Kingdom: Animalia
- Phylum: Arthropoda
- Clade: Pancrustacea
- Class: Insecta
- Order: Lepidoptera
- Family: Pterophoridae
- Genus: Hellinsia
- Species: H. conyzae

Binomial name
- Hellinsia conyzae (Gibeaux, 1994)

Synonyms
- Paulianilus conyzae Gibeaux, 1994

Species of plume moth

Hellinsia conyzae is a moth of the family Pterophoridae that is endemic to the Madagascar.

The larvae feed on Conyza lineariloba.
