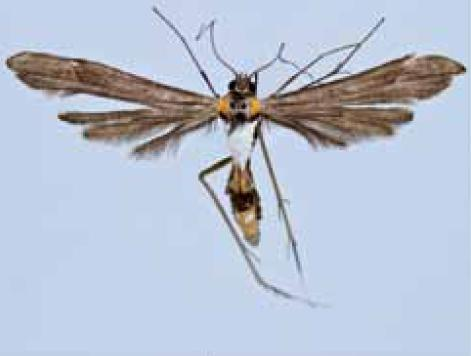

Scientific classification
- Kingdom: Animalia
- Phylum: Arthropoda
- Class: Insecta
- Order: Lepidoptera
- Family: Pterophoridae
- Genus: Hellinsia
- Species: H. ochracealis

Binomial name
- Hellinsia ochracealis (Walker, 1864)

Synonyms
- Utuca ochracealis Walker, 1864; Oidaematophorus ochracealis

= Hellinsia ochracealis =

Species of plume moth

Hellinsia ochracealis is a moth of the family Pterophoridae. It is found in Brazil, Nicaragua, Colombia and Peru.

The wingspan is 20–25 millimetres (0.79–0.98 in). Adults are on wing in January, March and July.
