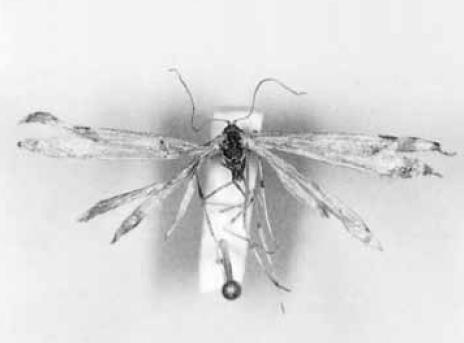

Scientific classification
- Kingdom: Animalia
- Phylum: Arthropoda
- Class: Insecta
- Order: Lepidoptera
- Family: Pterophoridae
- Genus: Hellinsia
- Species: H. monserrate

Binomial name
- Hellinsia monserrate Arenberger & Bond, 1995

= Hellinsia monserrate =

Species of plume moth

Hellinsia monserrate is a moth of the family Pterophoridae. It is found in Colombia.
