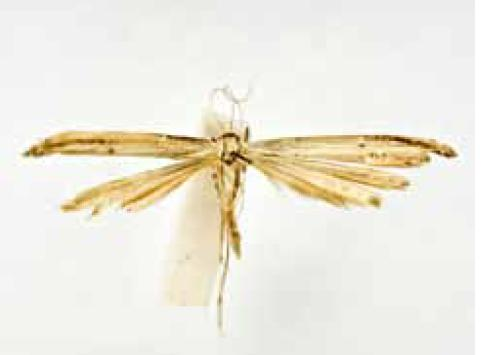

Scientific classification
- Kingdom: Animalia
- Phylum: Arthropoda
- Class: Insecta
- Order: Lepidoptera
- Family: Pterophoridae
- Genus: Hellinsia
- Species: H. crescens

Binomial name
- Hellinsia crescens (Meyrick, 1926)

Synonyms
- Pterophorus crescens Meyrick, 1926

= Hellinsia crescens =

Species of plume moth

Hellinsia crescens is a moth of the family Pterophoridae. It is found in Colombia, Ecuador, Brazil, Venezuela and Costa Rica.

The wingspan is 32–36 millimetres (1.3–1.4 in). Adults are on wing in January, March and December, at an altitude of 1,700 to 3,500 meters.
