= Hellinsia meyricki =

Scientific classification
- Domain: Eukaryota
- Kingdom: Animalia
- Phylum: Arthropoda
- Class: Insecta
- Order: Lepidoptera
- Family: Pterophoridae
- Genus: Hellinsia
- Species: H. meyricki

Binomial name
- Hellinsia meyricki (Barnes & Lindsey, 1921)

Synonyms
- Oidaematophorus meyricki Barnes & Lindsey, 1921 This article incorporates text from this source, which is in the public domain.

Species of plume moth

Hellinsia meyricki is a moth of the family Pterophoridae first described by William Barnes and Arthur Ward Lindsey in 1921. It is found in the US state of California (including the type location, San Diego).

The wingspan is 24–29 mm. It is similar to Hellinsia mizar, but the markings on the wings differ slightly in form. The head differs in having a contrasting white patch between the antennae. The palpi are brown touched with white below. The anterior half of the thorax is white. The posterior margins of the abdominal segments are whitish above. The abdomen is marked laterally with alternating oblique stripes of dark gray brown and white and has a lateral white line in the posterior half.

Adults have been recorded in April, May and June.

== Taxonomy ==
Some authors list Hellinsia meyricki as a synonym of Hellinsia fieldi.
