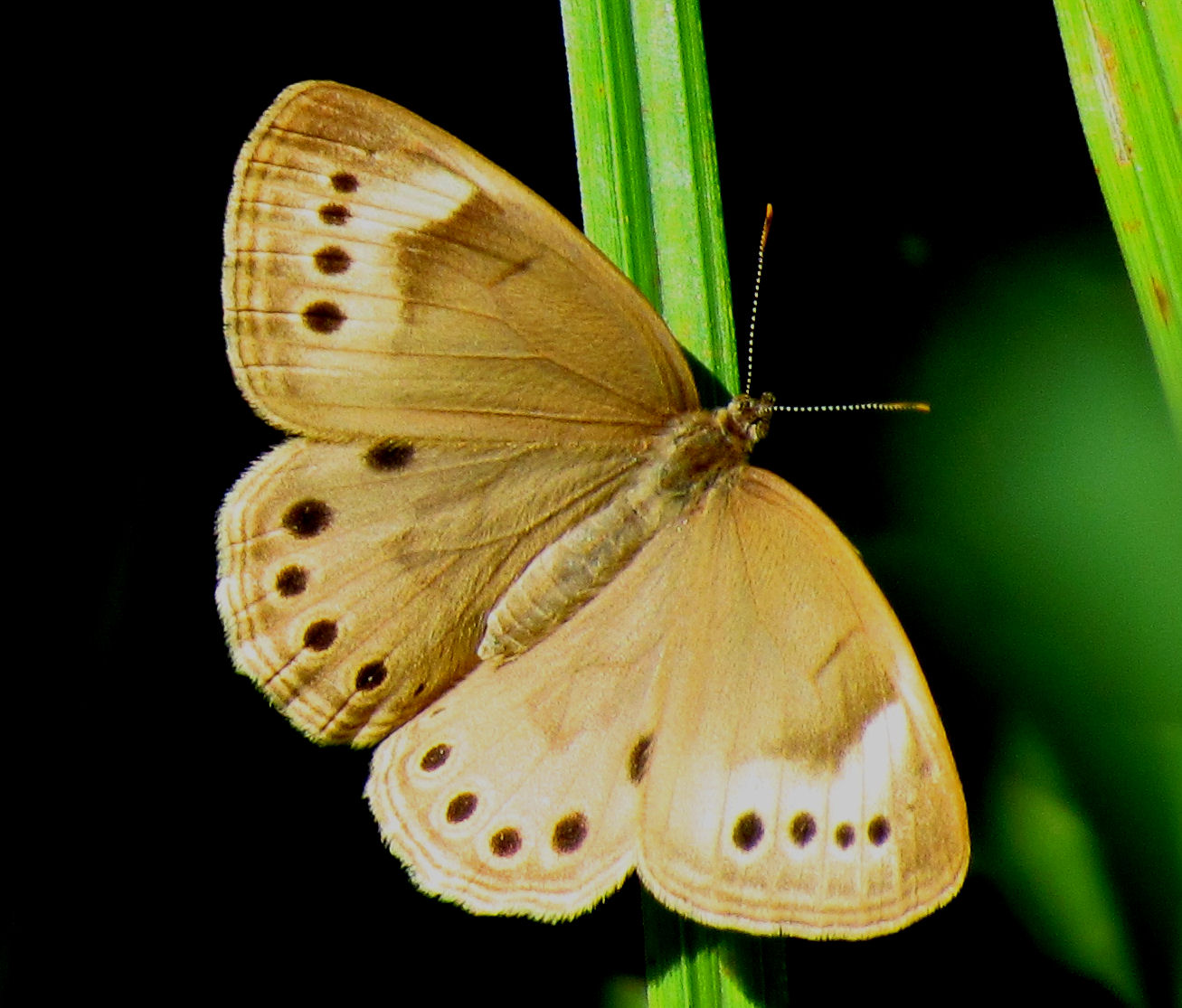
- Gatineau Park, Quebec, Canada
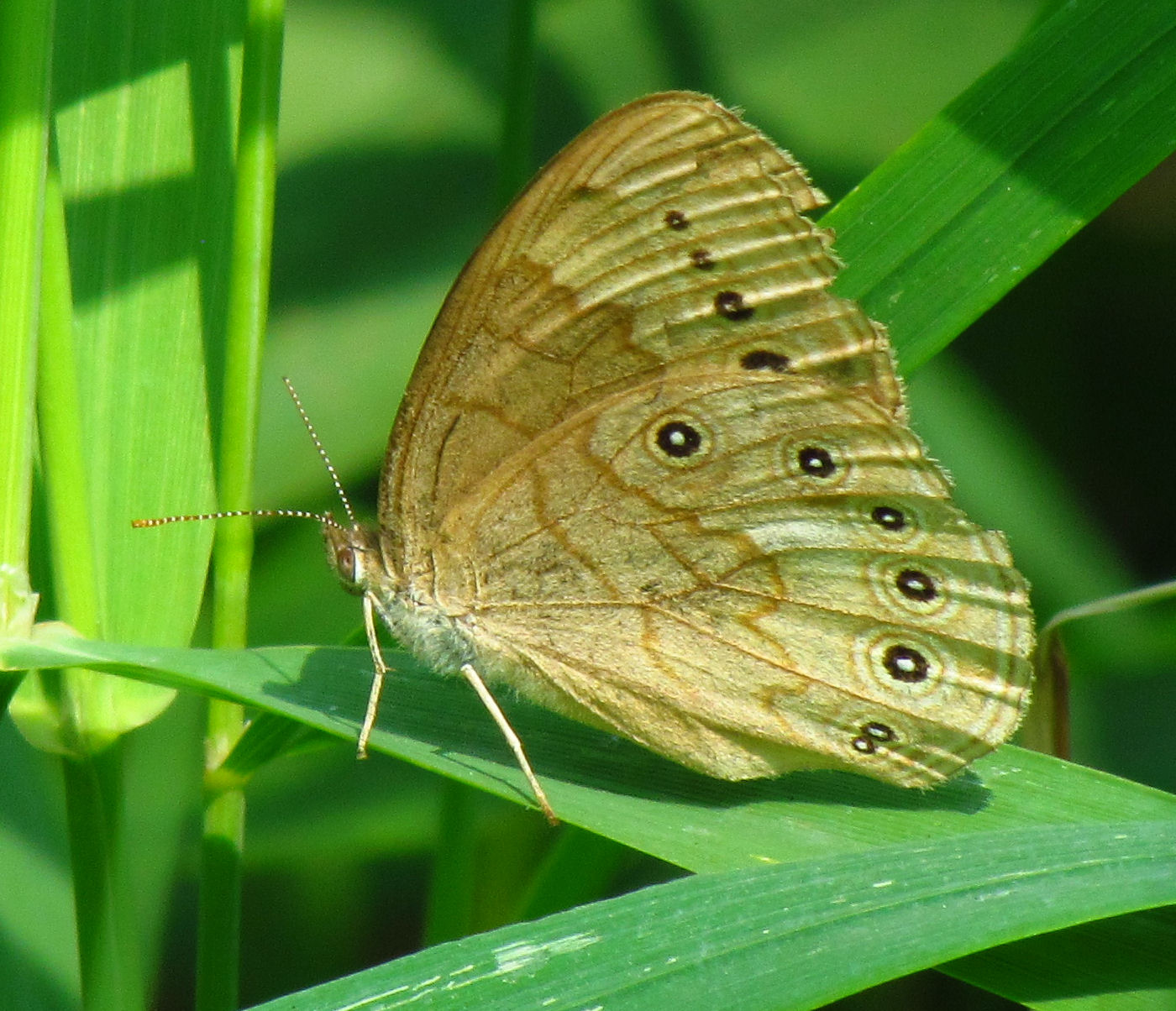
- Mer Bleue Conservation Area, Ottawa, Ontario, Canada

Scientific classification
- Kingdom: Animalia
- Phylum: Arthropoda
- Clade: Pancrustacea
- Class: Insecta
- Order: Lepidoptera
- Family: Nymphalidae
- Genus: Lethe
- Species: L. eurydice

Binomial name
- Lethe eurydice (Linnaeus, 1763)

Subspecies
- See text

Synonyms
- Papilio eurydice Linnaeus, 1763; Papilio canthus Linnaeus, 1767; Satyrodes eurydice (Linnaeus, 1763)

= Lethe eurydice =

Eyed brown

Species of butterfly

Lethe eurydice, the eyed brown or marsh eyed brown, is a species of Satyrinae butterfly that is native to North America.

There are two subspecies—the nominate species, the eyed brown (L. e. eurydice), and the smokey eyed brown (L. e. fumosa) (Leussler, 1916).

Wingspan: 38 to 48 mm.

They have one brood with a flight period from late June through August.

Larvae feed on sedges (Carex) in particular C. lacustris, C. atherodes, C. rostrata, and C. stricta.

== Similar species ==
- Lethe appalachia (R.L. Chermock, 1947) – Appalachian brown
- Lethe anthedon (A.H. Clark, 1936) – northern pearly-eye
