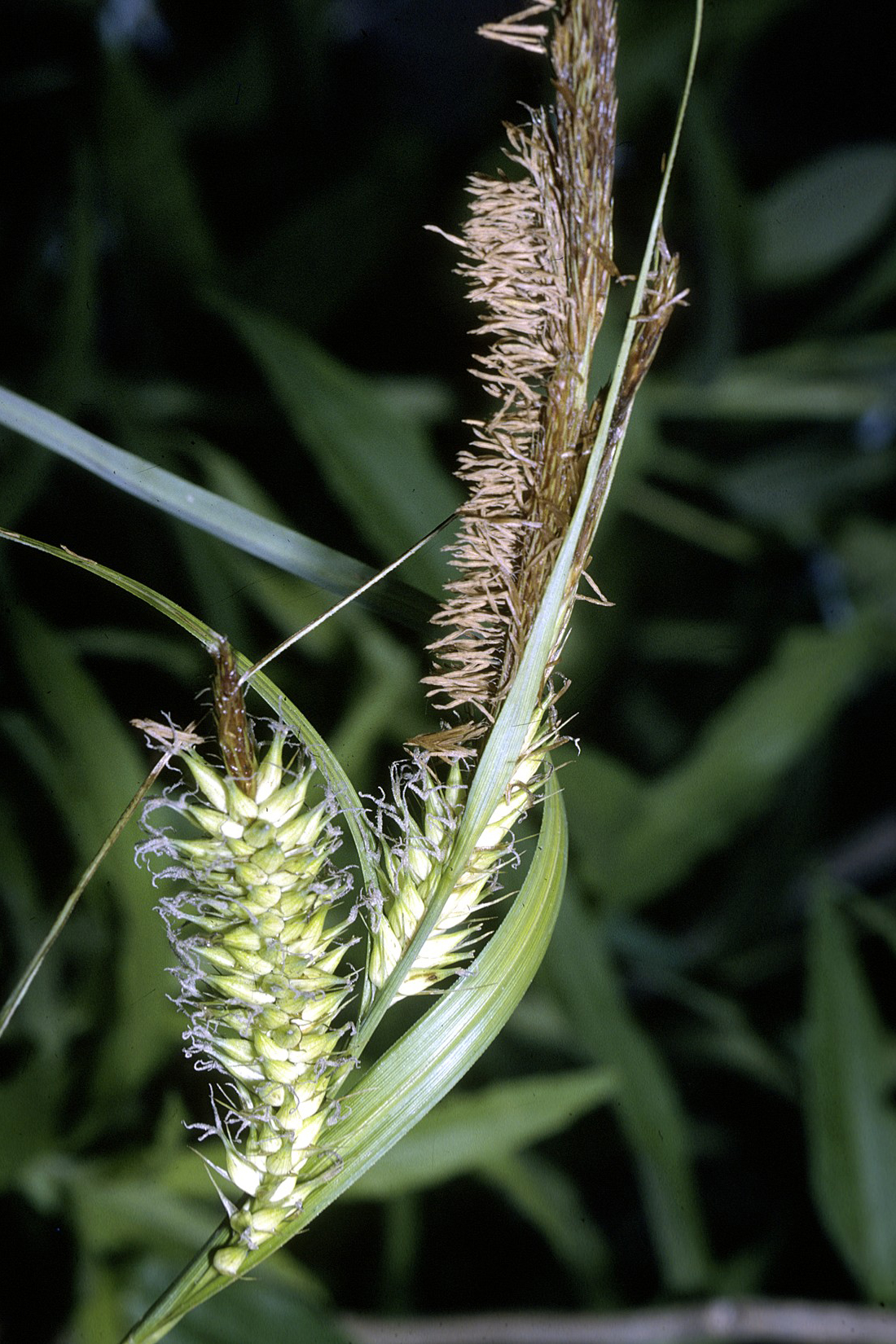

Conservation status
- Least Concern (IUCN 3.1)

- Secure (NatureServe)

Scientific classification
- Kingdom: Plantae
- Clade: Tracheophytes
- Clade: Angiosperms
- Clade: Monocots
- Clade: Commelinids
- Order: Poales
- Family: Cyperaceae
- Genus: Carex
- Subgenus: Carex subg. Carex
- Section: Carex sect. Paludosae
- Species: C. lacustris

Binomial name
- Carex lacustris Willd. 1805
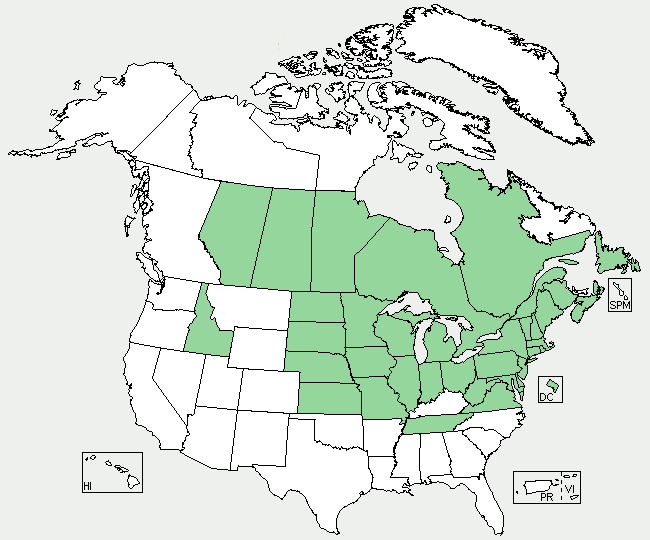
- US and Canadian distribution.

Synonyms
- C. riparia M.A. Curtis var. lacustris (Willd.) Kük.; Anithista lacustris (Willd.) Raf. 1840; Anithista riparia Raf. 1840; Carex riparia Muhl. 1817; Carex riparia var. lacustris Engler 1909

= Carex lacustris =

Species of grass-like plant

Carex lacustris, known as lake sedge (lucastris is from the Latin lacus, or lake), is a tufted grass-like perennial of the sedge family (Cyperaceae), native to southern Canada and the northern United States. C. lacustris us an herbaceous surface-piercing plant that grows in water up to 50 cm (1.6 ft) deep, and grows 50–150 cm (1.6–4.9 ft) tall. It grows well in marshes and swampy woods of the boreal forest, along river and lake shores, in ditches, marshes, swamps, and other wetland habitat. It grows on muck, sedge peat, wet sand or silt, in filtered or full sunlight.

It's a common sedge that dominates many native wetlands, or intermixes with other sedges and grasses, and its ability to spread by rhizomes makes it a good colonizer for a large area.

== Common names ==
In addition to lake sedge, other non-scientific names include common lake sedge, lakebank or lake-bank sedge, hairy sedge, and rip-gut sedge. Its common name in French is carex lacustre.

The common name should not be confused with lakeshore sedge (Carex lenticularis).

== Description ==
Stems are typically 50–150 cm (20–60 in) tall. Stems are rough to the touch, and have a triangular cross section, most distinctly near the base. They are green with a conspicuously reddish to purplish tinge at the base.

Leaf blades are grayish blue to dark green, grow as long or longer than the stems, and are 8–20 mm wide. They are coarse, and their cross-section is distinctly M-shaped. The sheaths around the stem are smooth, and basal (near the base) sheaths are reddened and have open, feather-like (pinnate) fibers.

Flowers on C. lacustris occur along spikes or spikelets, an elongated, tightly packed type of inflorescence (flower cluster) that contain many small florets. Plants typically have 4–8 green spikes, 2–4 upper spikes that are male (staminate spikes), and 2–4 lower spikes that are female (pistillate spikes). The male spikes are narrow, 3–4 mm wide, 1–8 cm long, and are short-lived. The female spikes are thick, 10–15 mm wide, and 2–10 cm long, either sessile (stalkless) or on short stalks, with 50–100 well-separated florets. Spikes are generally erect, with lower spikes sometimes nodding, and they are sometimes compound. The olive-green perigynium is 5.5–7.3 mm long, hairless, distinctly ribbed, and gradually tapers into a beak. Thin female scales are ovate (tapered at tip) and awned, translucent to purplish or brown in color, and half the length of the perigynia.

The fruit or nutlet is a three-sided achene with three stigmas.

Carex lacustris has a similar habitat and appearance to Carex atherodes, known as slough sedge or awned sedge, but C. atherodes typically have hairy leaf sheaths rather than smooth, and it has longer teeth (1.5–3 mm) on its perigynia.

== Habitat ==
C. lacustris is found in shallow marshes, marsh edges, shrub-carrs, alder thickets, wet and open thickets, open swamps, wooded swamps, sedge meadows, ditches, and borders of lakes, ponds, bogs, fens, and streams. It forms scattered clones or beds, and sometimes extensive stands are seen without fertile culms It is abundant and often a dominant plant of calcareous, north-temperate wetlands.

The species typically fruits from May to July.

=== Planting ===
C. lacrustris can reproduce from seeds, from rhizome runners, or from shoots. It does not naturally reestablish well in isolated wetlands restoration, likely due to limited water-borne seed dispersal. It benefits from well-planned restorations with an aim of dense stands to preempt undesired aggressive species.

Seeds should be stored in wet, dark, cold (4 °C) conditions for optimal germination rates. Recommended conditions for germination in a controlled environment are a cyclic diurnal temperature variation between 20 °C and 25 °C.

== Range ==
Native to the US and Canada, almost always occurring in wetlands. The full list of US states is CT, DC, DE, IA, ID, IL, IN, KS, MA, MD, ME, MI, MN, MO, ND, NE, NH, NJ, NY, OH, PA, RI, SD, TN, VA, VT, WI, and WV, and the full list of Canadian provinces is AB, MB, NB, NF, NS, ON, QC, and SK.

== Variants ==
The proposed variant Carex lacustris var. laxiflora (Dewey) is not accepted by ITIS, and is considered a synonym of Carex hyalinolepis Steud. (shoreline sedge). The proposed variant Carex lacustra var. gigantea is also not accepted, considered is a synonym of Carex gigantea (giant sedge).

== Hybrids ==
Rare natural hybrids of C. lacustris are known to occur with C. trichocarpa, C. hyalinolepis, C. pellita, and C. utriculata. The hybrids show morphological traits of both parents, and while infertile, can form extensive clones. The chromosome number of the hybrid parents do not need to be the same.

== Conservation status ==
The IUCN Red List considers this a "least concern" species . NatureServe ranks the species global conservation status as G5 (secure – very low risk of extinction or elimination). Its national rank in Canada is N5 (secure), and NNR (not ranked) in the United States, though some individual states are ranked, ranging from imperiled on the fringes of the species' range to secure nearer the center. The species is listed as "Threatened" by the states of Maryland and Tennessee, both near the southern edge of its known range.

== Wildlife use ==
Carex lacustris attracts waterfowl and songbirds, which eat its seeds, and butterflies, including the endangered Dukes' skipper, whose larvae feed exclusively on C. lacustris in the northern part of its Michigan range. Rodents and other small animals use stems as shelter and food in the winter.

Pike and muskies use the plants as spawning habitat in the spring.
