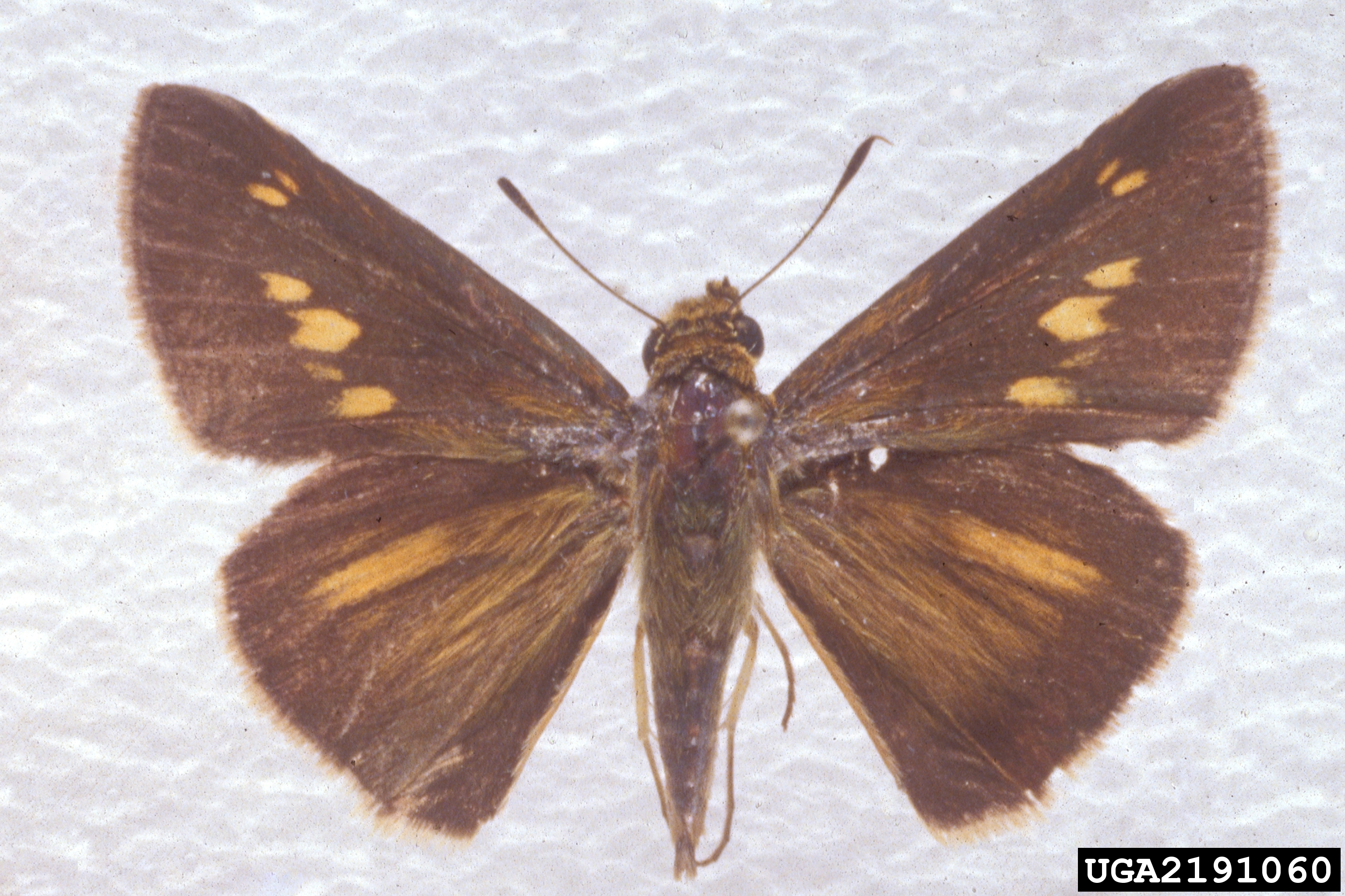
- Euphyes dion dion

Conservation status
- Secure (NatureServe)

Scientific classification
- Domain: Eukaryota
- Kingdom: Animalia
- Phylum: Arthropoda
- Class: Insecta
- Order: Lepidoptera
- Family: Hesperiidae
- Genus: Euphyes
- Species: E. dion

Binomial name
- Euphyes dion (W.H. Edwards, 1879)

Synonyms
- Pamphila dion W.H. Edwards, 1879; Euphyes macquirei Freeman, 1975; Limochroes dion (W.H. Edwards, 1879); Atrytone dion (W.H. Edwards, 1879)

= Euphyes dion =

Species of butterfly

Euphyes dion, the Dion skipper or Alabama skipper, is a species of butterfly of the family Hesperiidae. It is found in scattered populations along the Atlantic coast of North America, from western Massachusetts and south-eastern New York south to north-eastern Florida, west to north-eastern Texas, and north to south-eastern North Dakota, northern Wisconsin, southern Ontario and southern Quebec. It is listed as a species of special concern in the US state of Connecticut.

The wingspan is 37–45 mm. There is one generation with adults on wing from July to early August in the north and two generations with adults on wing from May to September in the south.

The larvae feed on various sedges, including Scirpus cyperinus, Carex lacustris and Carex hyalinolepis. Adults feed on nectar from various flowers including pickerelweed, sneezeweed, buttonbush and Alsike clover, among others.

== Subspecies ==
- Euphyes dion dion
- Euphyes dion alabamae (Lindsey, 1923)

== Gallery ==
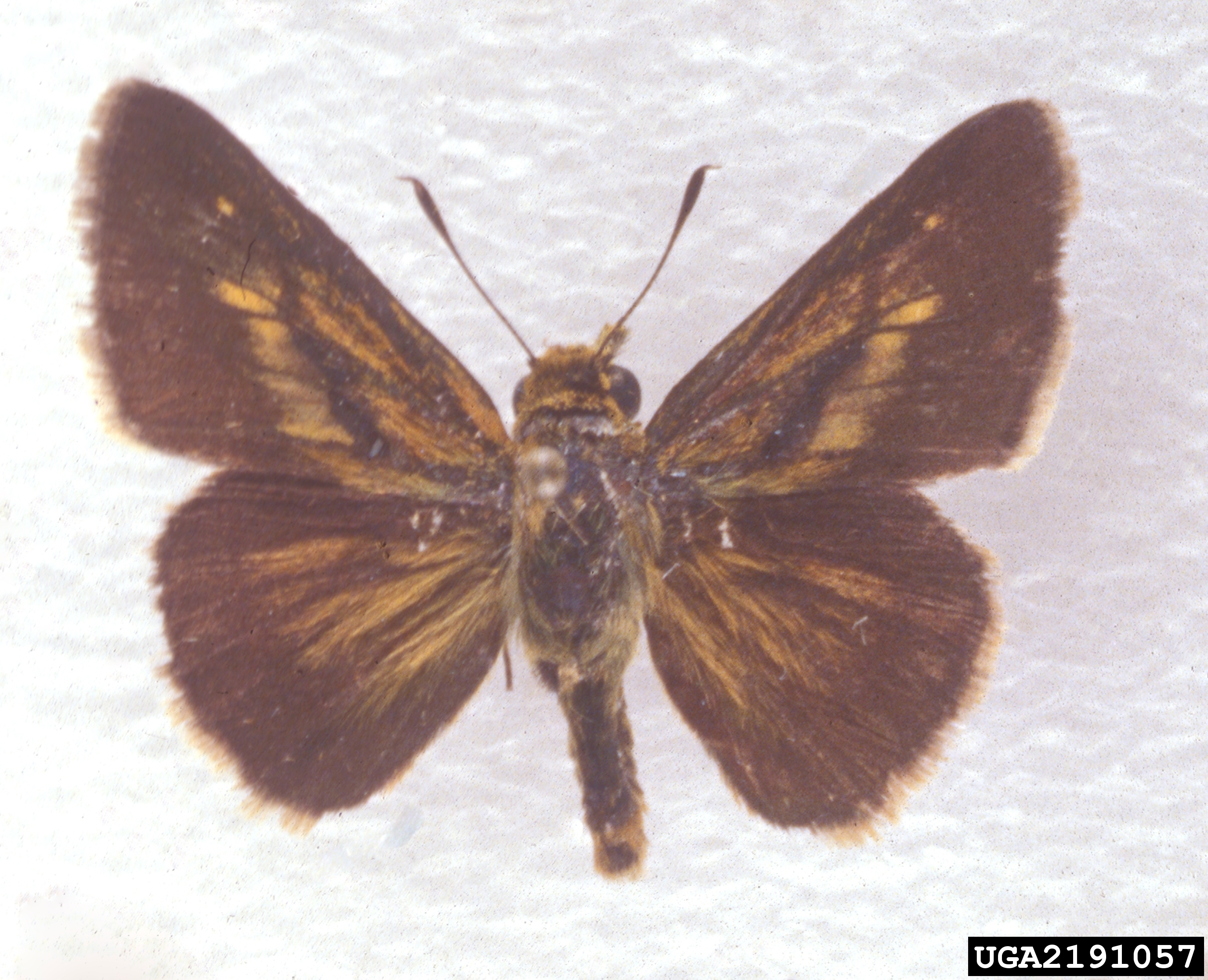
Euphyes dion alabamae
