= Hellinsia ares =

Scientific classification
- Domain: Eukaryota
- Kingdom: Animalia
- Phylum: Arthropoda
- Class: Insecta
- Order: Lepidoptera
- Family: Pterophoridae
- Genus: Hellinsia
- Species: H. ares

Binomial name
- Hellinsia ares (Barnes & Lindsey, 1921)

Synonyms
- Oidaematophorus ares Barnes & Lindsey, 1921

Species of plume moth

Hellinsia ares is a moth of the family Pterophoridae that is endemic to the US state of Utah. The species was first described by William Barnes and Arthur Ward Lindsey in 1921.

The wingspan is 20–22.5 millimetres (0.79–0.89 in). The head is brown, but tawny white between the antennae. The antennae have a row of variably heavy brown dots above. The thorax and abdomen are tawny, the latter with some single dorsal brown dots in the posterior margins of the segments, but otherwise immaculate. The forewings are even ocherous tawny. There is a brown dot near the middle and cleft of the cell preceded by a heavy but not large brown spot, from which a few scales sometimes extend to embrace the extreme base of the cleft. There are a few scattered brown scales on the wing, mostly along the inner margin near the base. The fringes are grayish tawny with a dark brownish-gray patch preceding the apex of the first lobe with a few pale hairs at the marginal dot, and a similar but paler and less conspicuous dark region at the apex of the second lobe. The hindwings are gray brown, their fringes a little more tawny.
