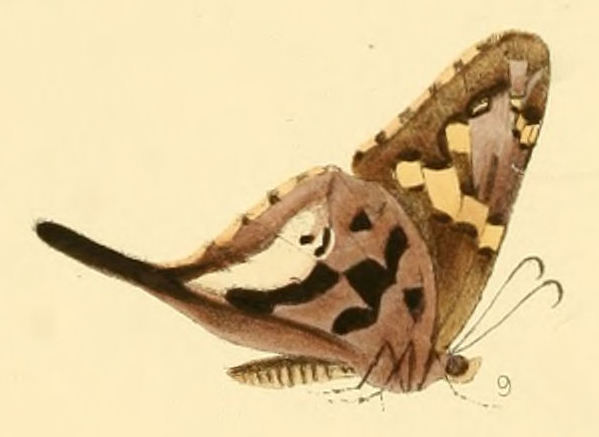
- Codatractus alcaeus

Scientific classification
- Kingdom: Animalia
- Phylum: Arthropoda
- Clade: Pancrustacea
- Class: Insecta
- Order: Lepidoptera
- Family: Hesperiidae
- Subfamily: Eudaminae
- Genus: Codatractus; Lindsey, 1921

= Codatractus =

Genus of butterflies

Codatractus is a Neotropical and Nearctic genus in the family Hesperiidae (Eudaminae).

== Species ==
The following species are recognised in the genus Codatractus:

- Codatractus cyledis (Dyar, 1912) - Mexico
- Codatractus bryaxis (Hewitson, 1867) Mexico to Guatemala
- Codatractus imalena (Butler, 1872) – Costa Rica to Colombia, Brazil (Amazonas).
- Codatractus arizonensis (Skinner, 1905) – Arizona skipper – southeast Arizona, New Mexico, west Texas, Mexico
- Codatractus sallyae Warren, 1995 – Mexico
- Codatractus melon (Godman & Salvin, [1893]) – Mexico, Guatemala, Nicaragua
- Codatractus carlos Evans, 1952
- Codatractus rowena Evans, 1952
- Codatractus alcaeus (Hewitson, 1867) – white-crescent longtail
- Codatractus apulia Evans, 1952
- Codatractus yucatanus Freeman, 1977 – Mexico
- Codatractus aminias (Hewitson, 1867) – Brazil, Paraguay, Argentina
