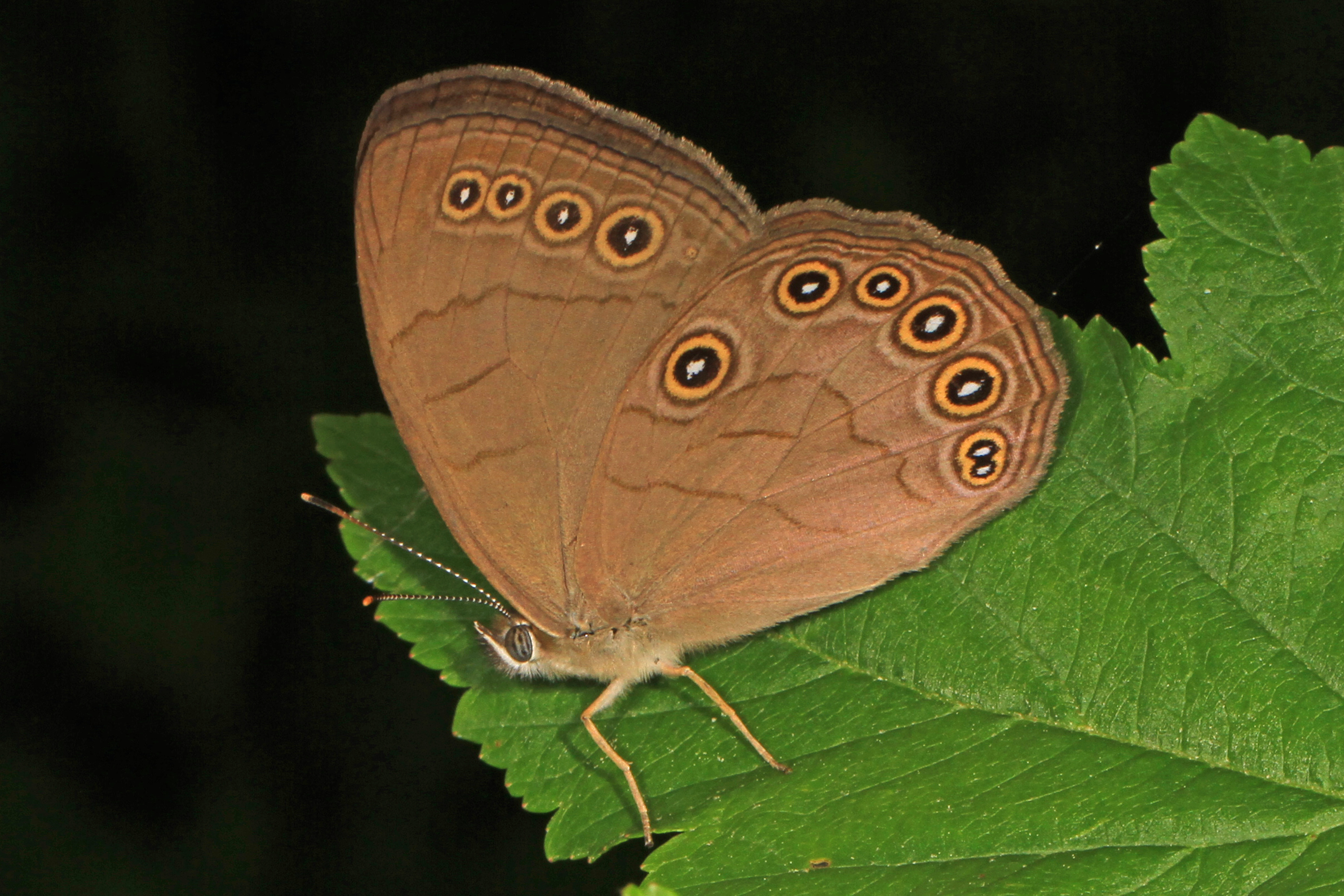

Conservation status
- Apparently Secure (NatureServe)

Scientific classification
- Kingdom: Animalia
- Phylum: Arthropoda
- Clade: Pancrustacea
- Class: Insecta
- Order: Lepidoptera
- Family: Nymphalidae
- Tribe: Elymniini
- Genus: Lethe
- Species: L. appalachia

Binomial name
- Lethe appalachia R.L. Chermock, 1947

Synonyms
- Satyrodes appalachia (R. Chermock, 1947)

= Lethe appalachia =

Species of butterfly

Lethe appalachia, commonly known as the Appalachian brown or Appalachian eyed brown, is a species of brush-footed butterfly in the family Nymphalidae. It is found in North America.

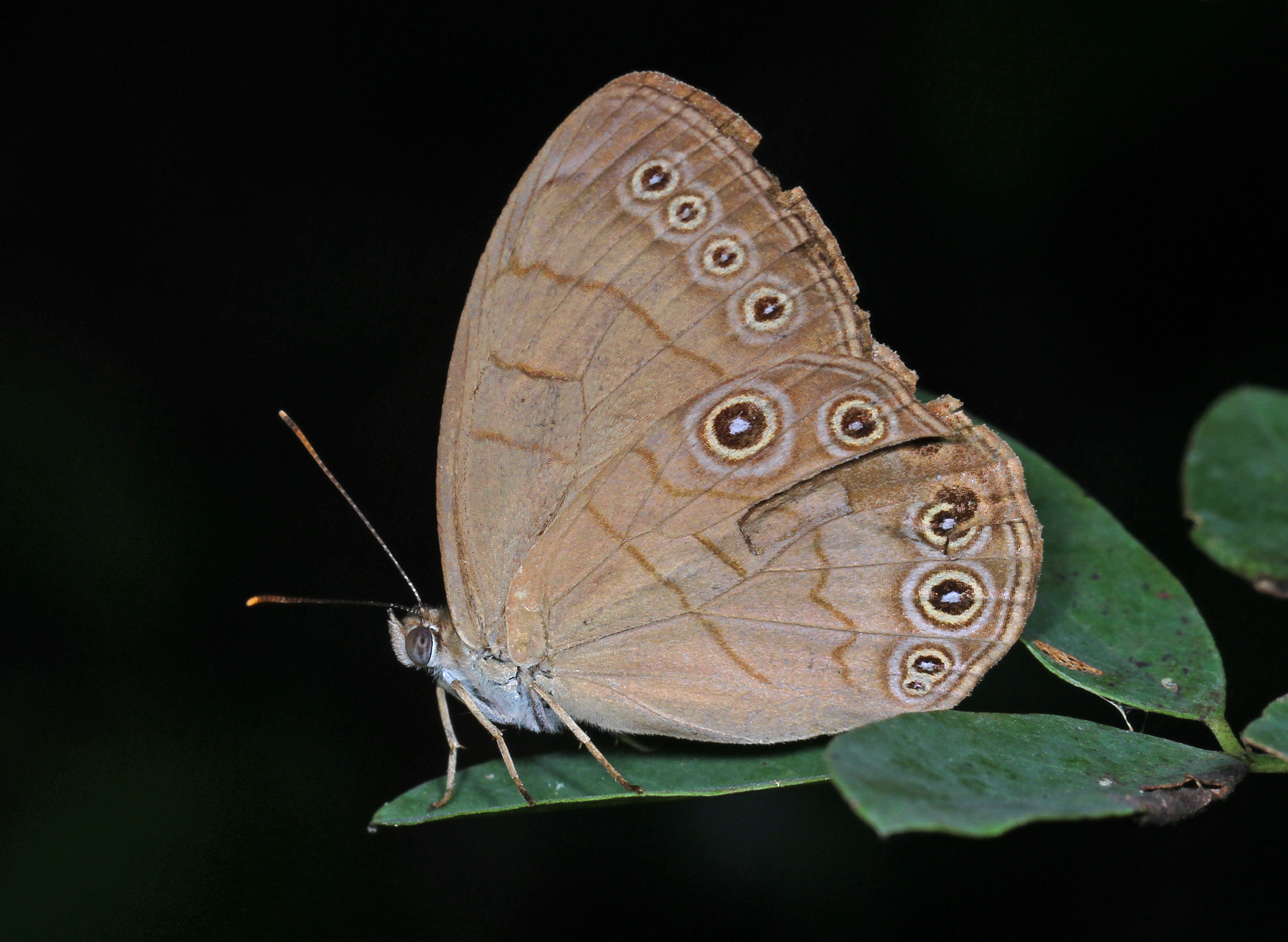
Appalachian brown, Lethe appalachia

== Subspecies ==
Two subspecies are recognised:ref name=

- Lethe appalachia appalachia R. Chermock, 1947
- Lethe appalachia leeuwi Gatrelle and Arbogast, 1974

== Description ==
Wingspan: 39 to 51 mm.

Larvae on Rhynchospora inundata, Carex lacustris, and Carex stricta.

=== Similar species ===
- Lethe eurydice (Linnaeus, 1763) – eyed brown
- Lethe anthedon (A.H. Clark, 1936) – northern pearly-eye
