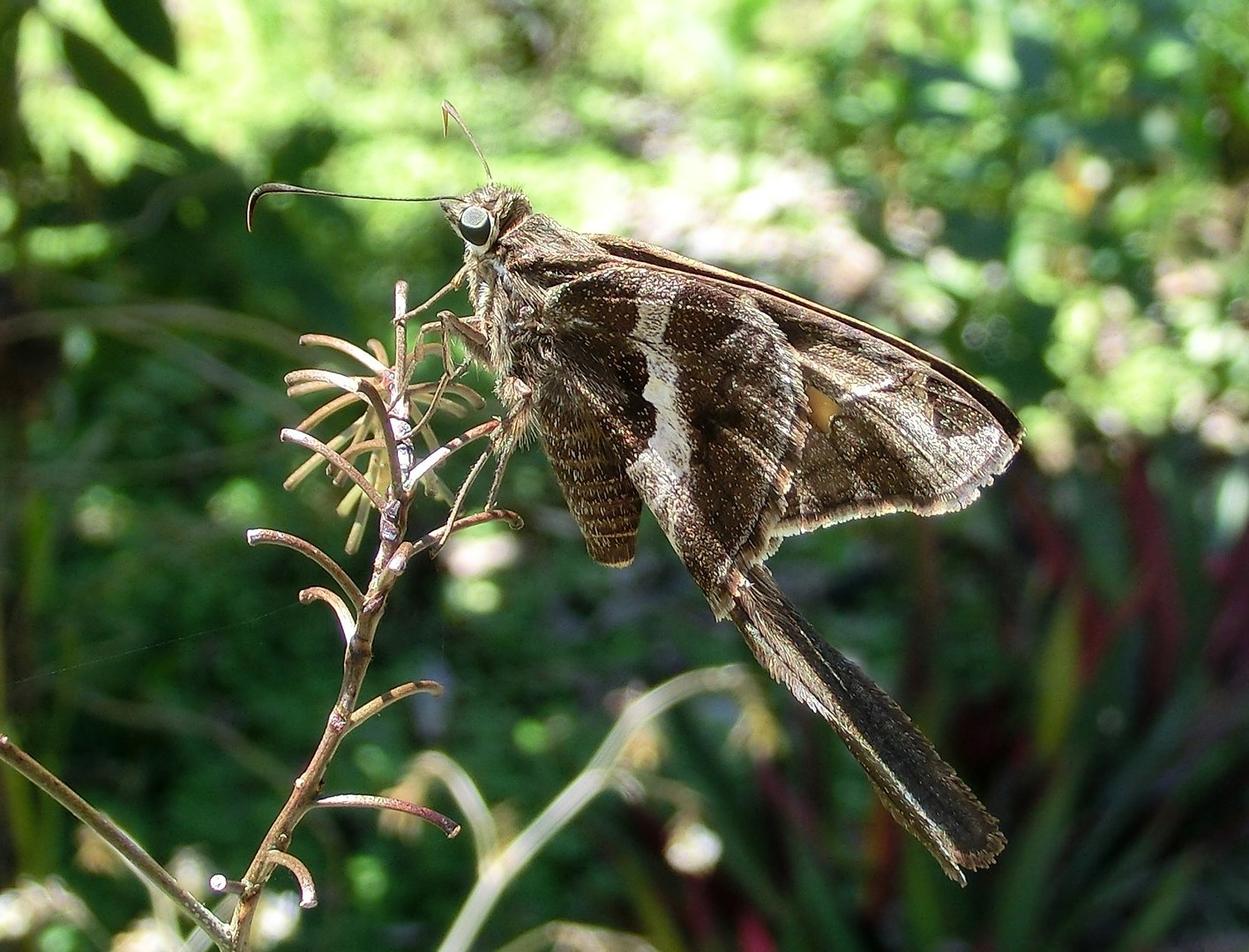
- Chioides albofasciatus

Scientific classification
- Kingdom: Animalia
- Phylum: Arthropoda
- Class: Insecta
- Order: Lepidoptera
- Family: Hesperiidae
- Subfamily: Eudaminae
- Genus: Chioides; Lindsey, 1921

Type species
- Eudamus albofasciatus Hewitson, 1867

= Chioides =

Genus of skipper butterflies

Chioides is a mainly Neotropical genus of skipper butterflies in the family Hesperiidae (Eudaminae)

They range from the south-western United States to Argentina and there are several Antillean endemic species. They are robust and have hindwing "tails".

== Species ==
The following species are recognised in the genus Chioides:

- Chioides albofasciatus (Hewitson, 1867)
- Chioides catillus (Cramer, 1780)
- Chioides churchi E. Bell & W. Comstock, 1948
- Chioides cinereus (Mabille & Vuillot, 1891)
- Chioides concinnus (Mabille, 1877)
- Chioides iverna Evans, 1952
- Chioides ixion (Plötz, 1881)
- Chioides marmorosa (Herrich-Schäffer, 1865)
- Chioides vintra Evans, 1952
- Chioides zilpa (Butler, 1874)

== Gallery ==
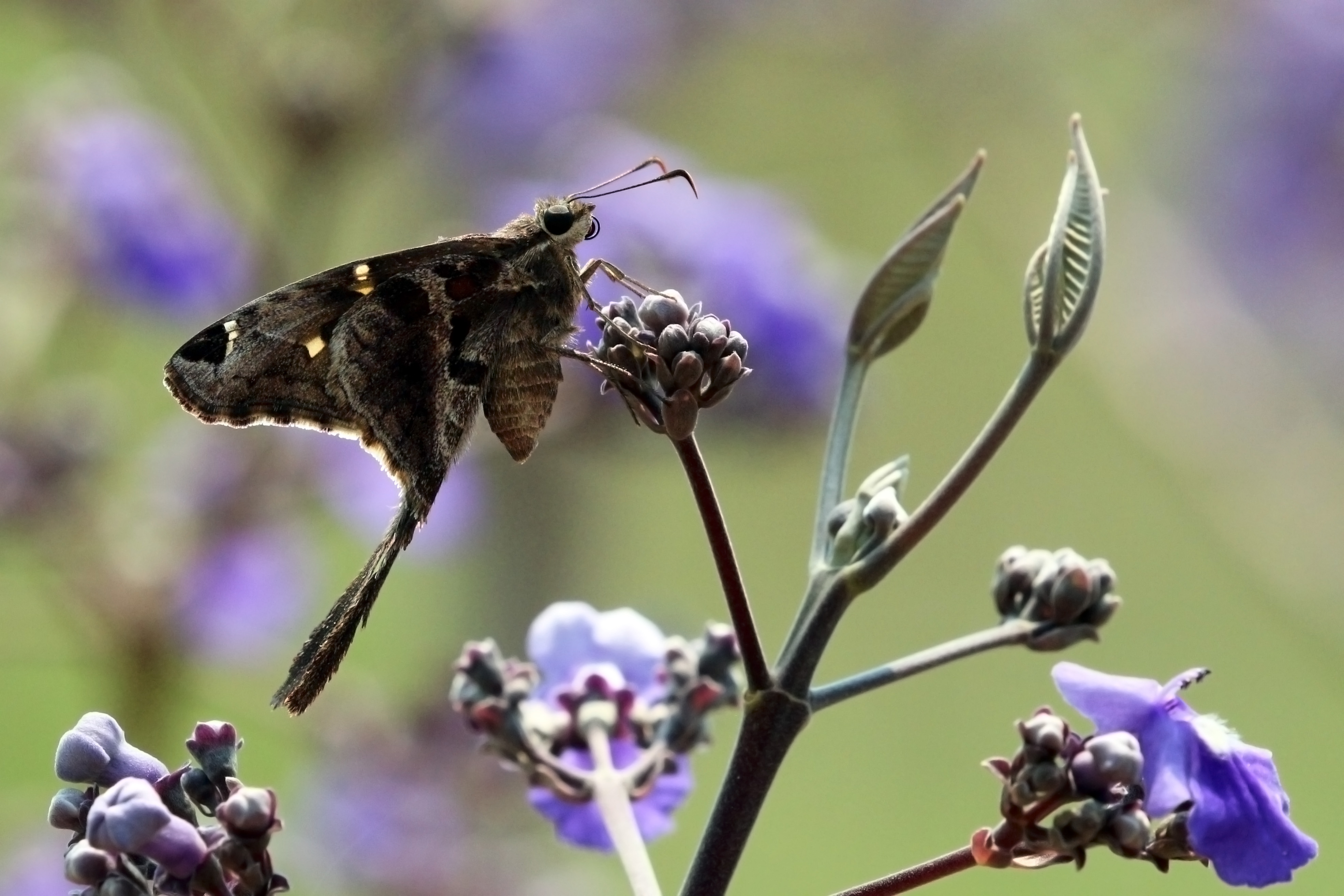
C. c. catillus
White-striped longtail, Brazil

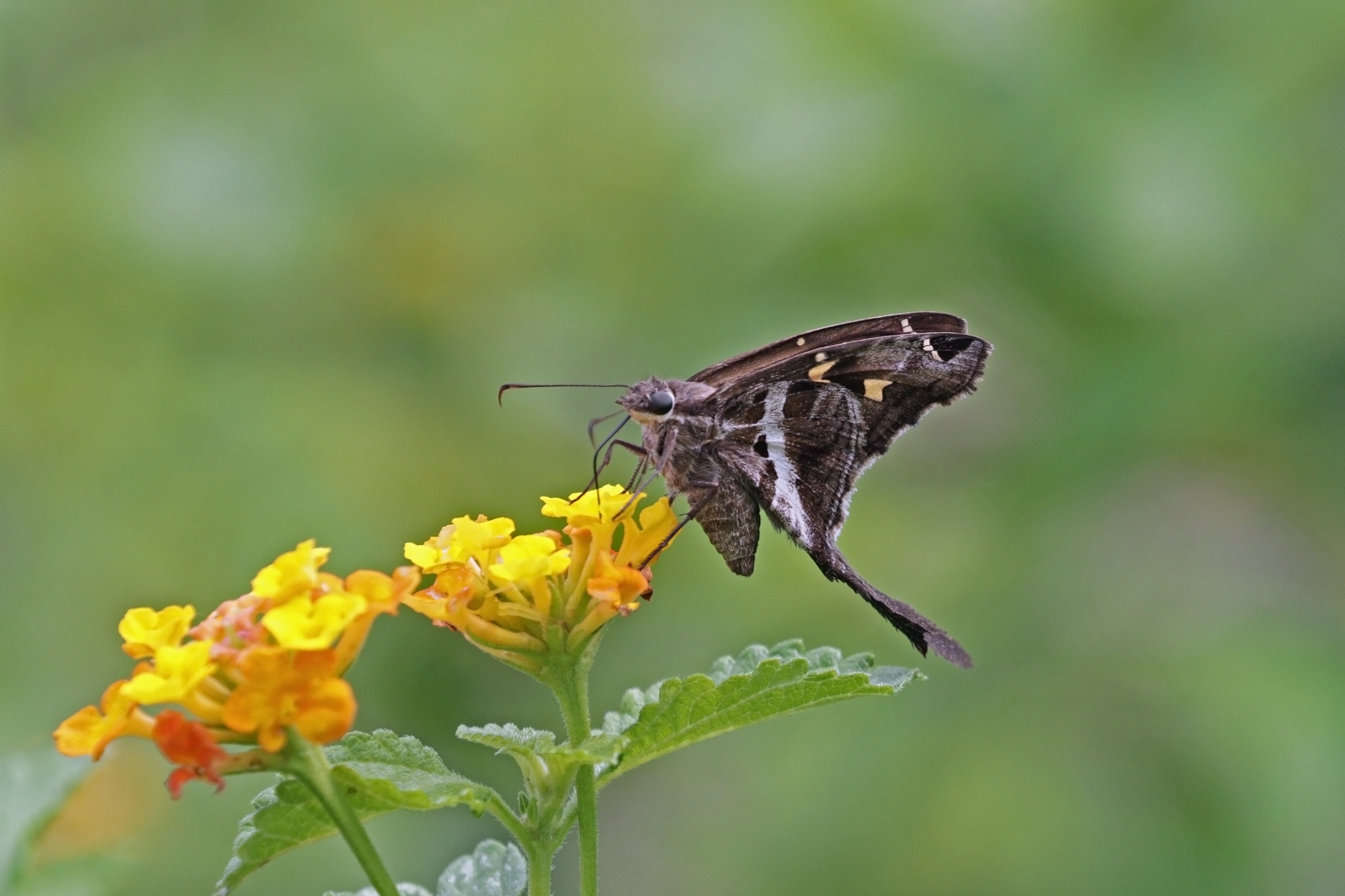
C. catillus albius
Blurry-striped longtail, Panama
