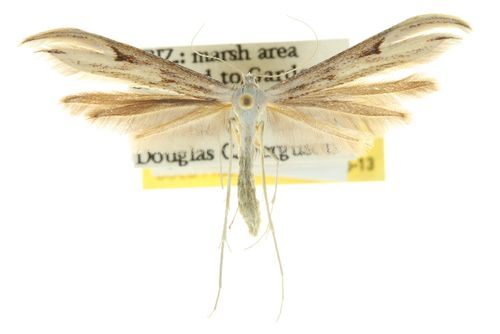

Scientific classification
- Domain: Eukaryota
- Kingdom: Animalia
- Phylum: Arthropoda
- Class: Insecta
- Order: Lepidoptera
- Family: Pterophoridae
- Genus: Hellinsia
- Species: H. pollux

Binomial name
- Hellinsia pollux (Barnes & Lindsey, 1921)

Synonyms
- Oidaematophorus pollux Barnes & Lindsey, 1921

= Hellinsia pollux =

Species of plume moth

Hellinsia pollux is a moth of the family Pterophoridae first described by William Barnes and Arthur Ward Lindsey in 1921. It is found in the U.S. states of California and Arizona (including the type location, the Chiricahua Mountains).

The wingspan is 27–33 millimetres (1.1–1.3 in). The forewings are white to pale yellowish white, although tinged with gray brown on the costa from the base to the apex. There is a blackish dash above the base of cleft, followed by one or two dots in a few specimens. The extreme apex of the first lobe is blackish and the apex of the second lobe has a blackish streak which is continued through the fringes. At a short distance before cleft is a small subtriangular brownish-black spot, curving toward the costal spot. There is sometimes a dot at the middle of the cell. The wing is sparsely sprinkled with dark scales which tend to collect along the veins and inner margin. The hindwings and fringes are gray brown.
