= Hellinsia cadmus =

Scientific classification
- Domain: Eukaryota
- Kingdom: Animalia
- Phylum: Arthropoda
- Class: Insecta
- Order: Lepidoptera
- Family: Pterophoridae
- Genus: Hellinsia
- Species: H. cadmus

Binomial name
- Hellinsia cadmus (Barnes & Lindsey, 1921)

Synonyms
- Oidaematophorus cadmus Barnes & Lindsey, 1921

Species of plume moth

Hellinsia cadmus is a moth of the family Pterophoridae first described by William Barnes and Arthur Ward Lindsey in 1921. It is found in North America, including Arizona (including the type location, the Huachuca Mountains) and California.

The wingspan is 14–16 mm. The head is brown in front, slightly brownish above and white between the antennae. The antennae and palpi are white. The thorax and abdomen are whitish, the latter with three brown stripes below and sometimes vague traces of two above. The forewings are white, irrorated (sprinkled) with brown. The brown scales darken the first lobe rather evenly, but are more or less blotchy elsewhere. At the base of the cleft is a white space preceded by a curved, powdery brown line which margins a patch of brown irroration joining a costal brown dash over the base of the cell. Beyond this is one other costal spot. The fringes are white or whitish, in the cleft with brownish-gray tufts at and before the apex of the first lobe. They are white on the costa, gray brown at spots and brownish gray mixed with white elsewhere, with two white patches on the outer margin of the second lobe. The hindwings and their fringes are very pale brownish gray.
