= Hellinsia medius =

Scientific classification
- Domain: Eukaryota
- Kingdom: Animalia
- Phylum: Arthropoda
- Class: Insecta
- Order: Lepidoptera
- Family: Pterophoridae
- Genus: Hellinsia
- Species: H. medius

Binomial name
- Hellinsia medius (Barnes & Lindsey, 1921)

Synonyms
- Oidaematophorus medius Barnes & Lindsey, 1921

Species of plume moth

Hellinsia medius is a moth of the family Pterophoridae first described by William Barnes and Arthur Ward Lindsey in 1921. It is found in the US state of Texas.

The wingspan is 17–19 mm. The head is brownish, but creamy white between the antennae. These are pale above and dotted with brown. The thorax is whitish with a light brown band across the tips of the patagia. The abdomen is gray brown with white scales, whiter above toward the base, and on posterior margins of segments, which are also marked with single dorsal brown dots. The forewings are pale dull gray brown with some whitish scales and a variable sprinkling of black ones. There is a rather heavy oblique black dash or spot contiguous to the base of the cleft and a costal spot above it, preceded and followed by whitish fringes. The first lobe has two faint black costal dots, one apical and one preapical on the inner margin, and both it and the second are more or less streaked with the black irroration (sprinkling). There is an inconspicuous subcostal line. The hindwings and fringes of both wings are gray brown.
