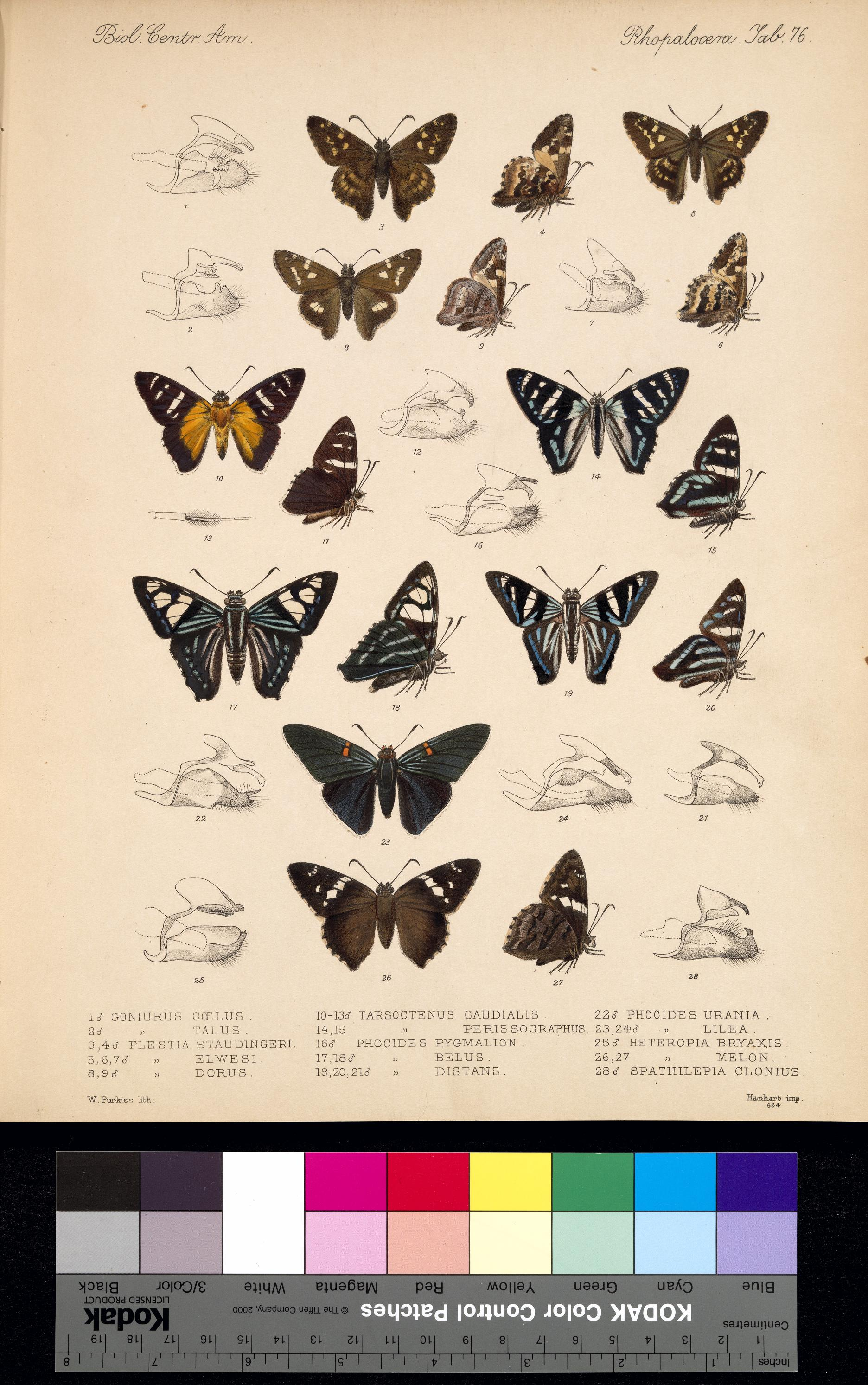
- Zestusa figures 3-9

Scientific classification
- Kingdom: Animalia
- Phylum: Arthropoda
- Class: Insecta
- Order: Lepidoptera
- Family: Hesperiidae
- Subtribe: Loboclina
- Genus: Zestusa; Lindsey, 1925

Synonyms
- Plestia Mabille, 1888

= Zestusa =

Genus of butterflies

Zestusa is a genus of skippers in the family Hesperiidae subfamily Eudaminae. Species of the genus occur in Mexico and the western United States.

== Species ==
The following species are recognised in the genus Zestusa:

- Zestusa dorus (W. H. Edwards, 1882)
- Zestusa elwesi (Godman & Salvin, 1893)
- Zestusa staudingeri (Mabille, 1888)
- Zestusa levona Steinhauser, 1972
