= Hellinsia cochise =

Scientific classification
- Domain: Eukaryota
- Kingdom: Animalia
- Phylum: Arthropoda
- Class: Insecta
- Order: Lepidoptera
- Family: Pterophoridae
- Genus: Hellinsia
- Species: H. cochise

Binomial name
- Hellinsia cochise (Barnes & Lindsey, 1921)

Synonyms
- Oidaematophorus cochise Barnes & Lindsey, 1921

Species of plume moth

Hellinsia cochise is a moth of the family Pterophoridae that is found in Arizona (including the type location, the Huachuca Mountains). The species was first described by William Barnes and Arthur Ward Lindsey in 1921.

The wingspan is 17–19 millimetres (0.67–0.75 in). The head is brown, with a whitish patch between the antennae. These are whitish with a brown line above. The thorax and abdomen are brownish white, the latter with a few dorsal and lateral brown dots. The forewings are pale tawny, sometimes more whitish toward the base. The costa is brown from the base almost to the cleft, then with a brown dash, sometimes no more conspicuous than the first line, which is preceded and followed by some whitish scales. There are two dark brown costal dots on the first lobe, an apical dot and one before the apex on the inner margin. The second lobe is with or without a few dark dots at the tips of the veins. The cleft is preceded by a brown spot, the intervening space is often filled with scales of the same color. There is also a small dot near the middle of the cell, some scattered brown scales, less numerous toward costa, and sometimes a few white scales in the apices of the lobes. The fringes are tawny gray along the inner margin, a little darker around the apex of the second lobe and in the cleft and dark brownish gray before the apex of the first lobe with a white pencil at the marginal dot. There are some white hairs along the fringes and a few pale areas, especially on the outer margin of the second lobe where there are two (often whitish). The hindwings and fringes are brownish gray to grayish tawny.
