= Hellinsia luteolus =

Scientific classification
- Domain: Eukaryota
- Kingdom: Animalia
- Phylum: Arthropoda
- Class: Insecta
- Order: Lepidoptera
- Family: Pterophoridae
- Genus: Hellinsia
- Species: H. luteolus

Binomial name
- Hellinsia luteolus (Barnes & Lindsey, 1921)

Synonyms
- Oidaematophorus luteolus Barnes & Lindsey, 1921

Species of plume moth

Hellinsia luteolus is a moth of the family Pterophoridae first described by William Barnes and Arthur Ward Lindsey in 1921. It is found in the US state of Arizona (including the type location, the Huachuca Mountains).

The wingspan is 20–21 mm. The head is brown (sometimes pale) but whitish between the antennae. The antennae are whitish above, darker below, sometimes with a blackish line above near the base. The thorax and abdomen are yellowish, pale brownish white or tawny. The forewings are a little paler than the thorax and abdomen and generally tawny white. The inner margin of the first lobe has a fine blackish brown dot before the apex. The cleft is preceded at some distance by a similar but larger dot. The fringes are concolorous. The hindwings and their fringes are a little darker and more grayish.
