= Hellinsia triton =

Scientific classification
- Domain: Eukaryota
- Kingdom: Animalia
- Phylum: Arthropoda
- Class: Insecta
- Order: Lepidoptera
- Family: Pterophoridae
- Genus: Hellinsia
- Species: H. triton

Binomial name
- Hellinsia triton (Barnes & Lindsey, 1921)

Synonyms
- Oidaematophorus triton Barnes & Lindsey, 1921

Species of moth

Hellinsia triton is a moth of the family Pterophoridae first described by William Barnes and Arthur Ward Lindsey in 1921. It is found in the US state of Arizona (including the type location, the Huachuca Mountains).

The wingspan is 18–20 millimetres (0.71–0.79 in). The head is brown with a whitish patch between the whitish antennae. The thorax is whitish and the abdomen is light brown with some dorsal brown spots. The forewings are white suffused with light gray. The fringes on the costa are white with a few grayish scales, elsewhere they are brownish gray, but darker in the cleft. The hindwings are entirely brownish gray.
