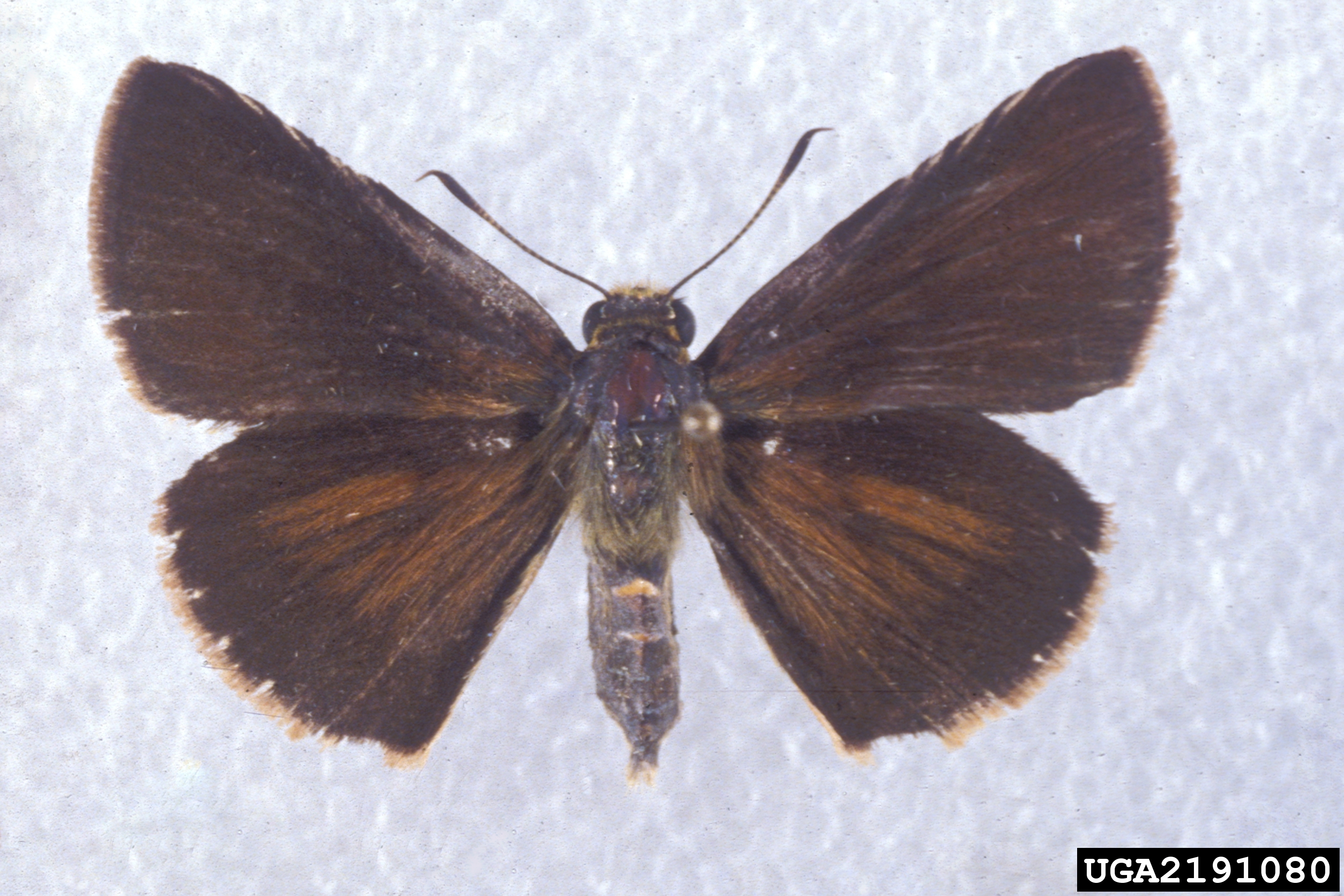

Conservation status
- Vulnerable (NatureServe)

Scientific classification
- Kingdom: Animalia
- Phylum: Arthropoda
- Clade: Pancrustacea
- Class: Insecta
- Order: Lepidoptera
- Family: Hesperiidae
- Genus: Euphyes
- Species: E. dukesi

Binomial name
- Euphyes dukesi (Lindsey, 1923)

Subspecies
- E. d. dukesi Lindsey, 1923; E. d. calhouni Shuey, 1996
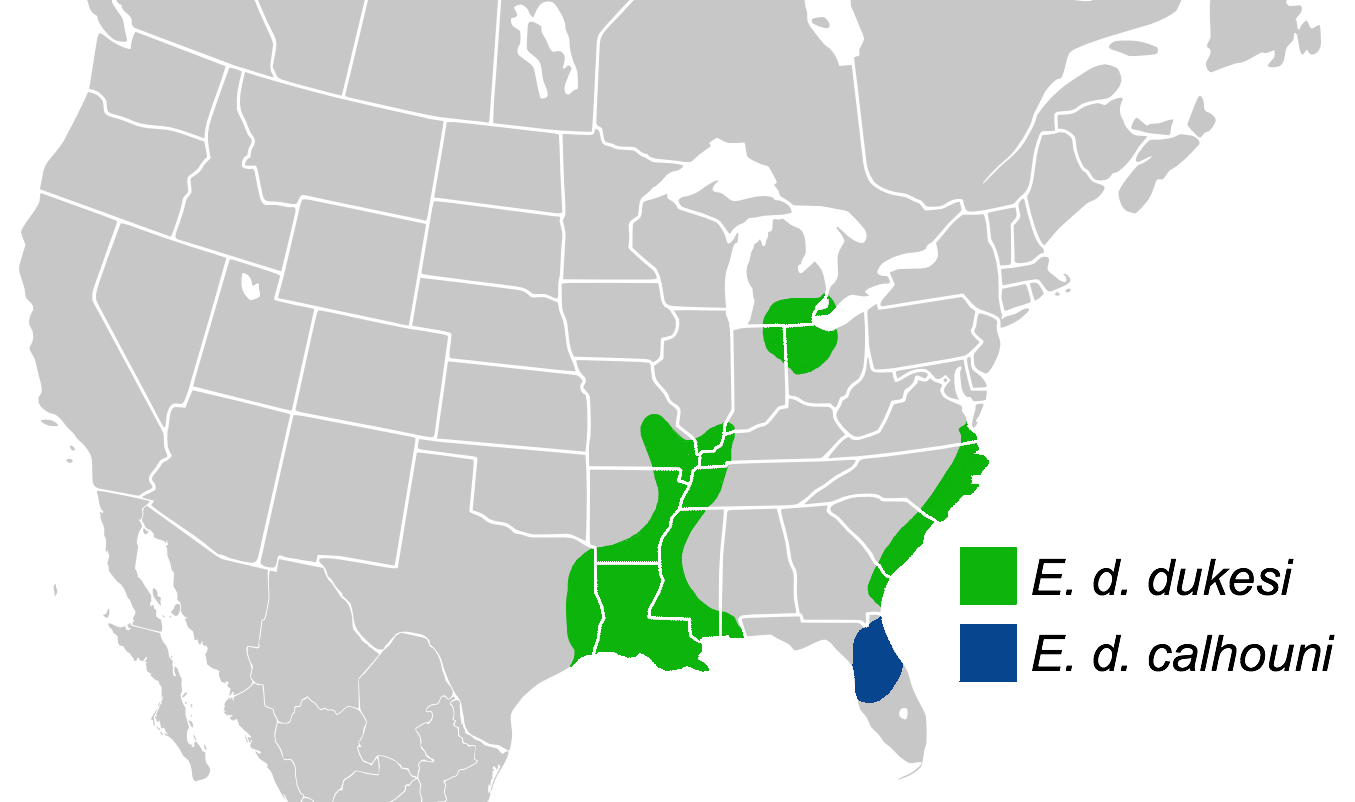
- Generalized range

Synonyms
- Atrytone dukesi Lindsey, 1923

= Euphyes dukesi =

Species of butterfly

Euphyes dukesi, or Dukes' skipper, is a butterfly of the family Hesperiidae. It lives in the eastern United States and in a small portion of southern Ontario, Canada, in three distinct populations. Preferred habitats are shaded wetlands (woodland or coastal swamps, marshes, and ditches), with various species of sedge plants it uses as host plants for its larvae.

== Description ==
They have short, rounded wings with a wingspan of 32 to 38 mm (1.3 to 1.5 in). The wings of both sexes are deep brown on top, and the underside of the hindwings are light brown with pale yellow rays. They are similar in appearance to other Euphyes, but "the single yellowish streak on the hindwing beneath is unmistakable." Females are slightly larger than males and have a hindwing band with two to three pale yellow spots, while males have a black stigma on the forewing. Caterpillars have a light green body with a black head.

For male genitalia have "five toothed processes at the terminus of the aedoeagus."

=== Naming ===
The species was named for W. C. Dukes of Mobile, Alabama, in Arthur Ward Lindsey's original 1923 description of the species, "in acknowledgment of his unselfish efforts to advance our knowledge of the Lepidoptera of Alabama." The first specimen was collected by Dukes on August 6, 1922, in Mobile County, Alabama.

== Distribution ==
Dukes' skipper is found in scattered locations around the eastern United States and a small portion of southeastern Canada. There are three distinct regionally clustered populations:

- Along the Atlantic Coast from southeastern Virginia to northern peninsular Florida.
- The lower Mississippi Valley from central Missouri and southern Illinois south to the Gulf Coast.
- Extreme southwestern Ontario, southeastern Michigan, northeastern Indiana, and northern Ohio.

Its full distribution consists of the Canadian province of Ontario and the following US states: Alaska, Arkansas, Florida, Georgia, Illinois, Indiana, Kentucky, Louisiana, Michigan, Missouri, Mississippi, North Carolina, Ohio, South Carolina, Texas, and Virginia.

The split distribution between coastal plains and the Great Lakes area is unusual for North American butterflies, and it is hypothesized that it may be due to population displacements during the Pleistocene glacial intervals, followed by dispersal through the vegetational corridors of the Mississippi and Mohawk valleys when the ice sheets retreated.

== Life cycle ==
Eggs are laid singly under the leaves of the host plants on which the larvae feed. Larvae molt several times, diapause to overwinter in their fourth instar, feed again and molt once more in the spring, then pupate for about two weeks before emerging as adults. Its adult lifespan is estimated at three weeks, and its total lifespan from hatching is about a year or less.

== Broods ==
The species ranges from univoltine in the north to trivoltine in the south, with flight periods lasting approximately one month. In northern populations, the species typically has a single brood around July. From western Kentucky and Virginia southward, it has one brood around June and a second brood around August to September. In Florida, the subspecies E. dukesi calhouni may have more than two broods, from mid-May through October.

== Food ==
Host plants used by larvae are restricted to various sedges of the genera Carex and Rhynchospora. These include hairy sedge Carex lacustris in the north (particularly in shaded wetlands, including coastal swamps and ditches), shoreline sedge Carex hyalinolepis in the south (Mississippi River basin), false hop sedge Carex lupuliformis, Carex walteriana, Walter's sedge (Carex striata) in the southeast, narrowfruit horned beaksedge (Ryncospora inundata), and millet beaksedge (Rynchospora miliacea) in Florida.

Adults feed on flower nectar of various plants including buttonbush (Cephalanthus occidentalis), common milkweed (Asclepias syriaca), swamp milkweed (Asclepias incarnata), Joe-Pye weed (Eupatorium maculatum), blue mistflower (Eupatorium coelestinum), pickerelweed (Pontederia cordata), hibiscus species (Hibiscus), sneezeweed (Helenium autumnale), alfalfa (Medicago sativa), and red clover (Trifolium pratense).

== Subspecies ==
There are two subspecies of Euphyes dukesi: the nominate subspecies discovered in 1922, and a swamp-dwelling Florida subspecies discovered in 1995.

- Euphyes dukesi dukesi Lindsey, 1923: "Occurs from the Lake Erie region south mostly through the Ohio and Mississippi drainages to Louisiana, and disjunctly on the Atlantic coastal plain from Virginia to Georgia."
- Euphyes dukesi calhouni Shuey, 1996: Allopatric with E. dukesi dukesi, this subspecies occurs in the southern US coastal plain, and is endemic to Florida. It lives in swamp habitats with large stands of sedge host plants (primarily Rhynchospora inundata).

The divergence of two subspecies may have occurred due to isolation of Florida and other populations during the Wisconsinian glaciation or an earlier glacier event, with boreal forests acting as barriers.

E. d. calhouni is named after John Calhoun, who studied its ecology and recognized its distinctiveness, and Shuey proposed the common name Florida swamp skipper to emphasize its endemic range and habitat, but which has also been proposed for the species Euphyes berryi.

Distinguishing characteristics between the subspecies:

- The ground color of E. d. calhouni is darker, nearing black, compared to the dark brown ground color of E. d. dukesi, which contrasts with a black stigma in males.
- Dorsal wings of E. d. calhouni have overscaling of olive-brown hairs, while E. d. dukesi have overscaling of orange-brown hairs.
- On the ventral forewing of E. d. calhouni, overscaling is olive brown, while on E. d. dukesi overscaling is heavier and is orange brown, in strong contrast with the ground color.
- On the ventral hindwing of E. d. calhouni, the yellow dash between veins M_{1} and M_{2} is diffuse and often does not reach the edge of the wing, and there is usually no yellow dash between veins Cu_{2} and 2A. On E. d. dukesi, both yellow dashes are typically heavily scaled and extend boldly to the edge of the wing in fresh specimens.
- Wing fringes of E. d. calhouni are mostly dark and match the dorsal ground color, except a lightening in the anal region of the hindwing. In E. d. dukesi the fringes are lighter than the ground color.

== Conservation status ==
Dukes' skipper's threat status has not been assessed by the IUCN Red List, nor is it covered by the US Endangered Species Act or Canadian Species at Risk Act. The state of Michigan lists it as a threatened species protected by state law, the Xerces Society Red List of Butterflies and Moths lists it as vulnerable, and NatureServe lists the species' national conservation status as N3 (vulnerable) in the United States and N2 (imperiled) in Canada, with a global status of G3 (vulnerable), last reviewed in 2008 as of 2013.
