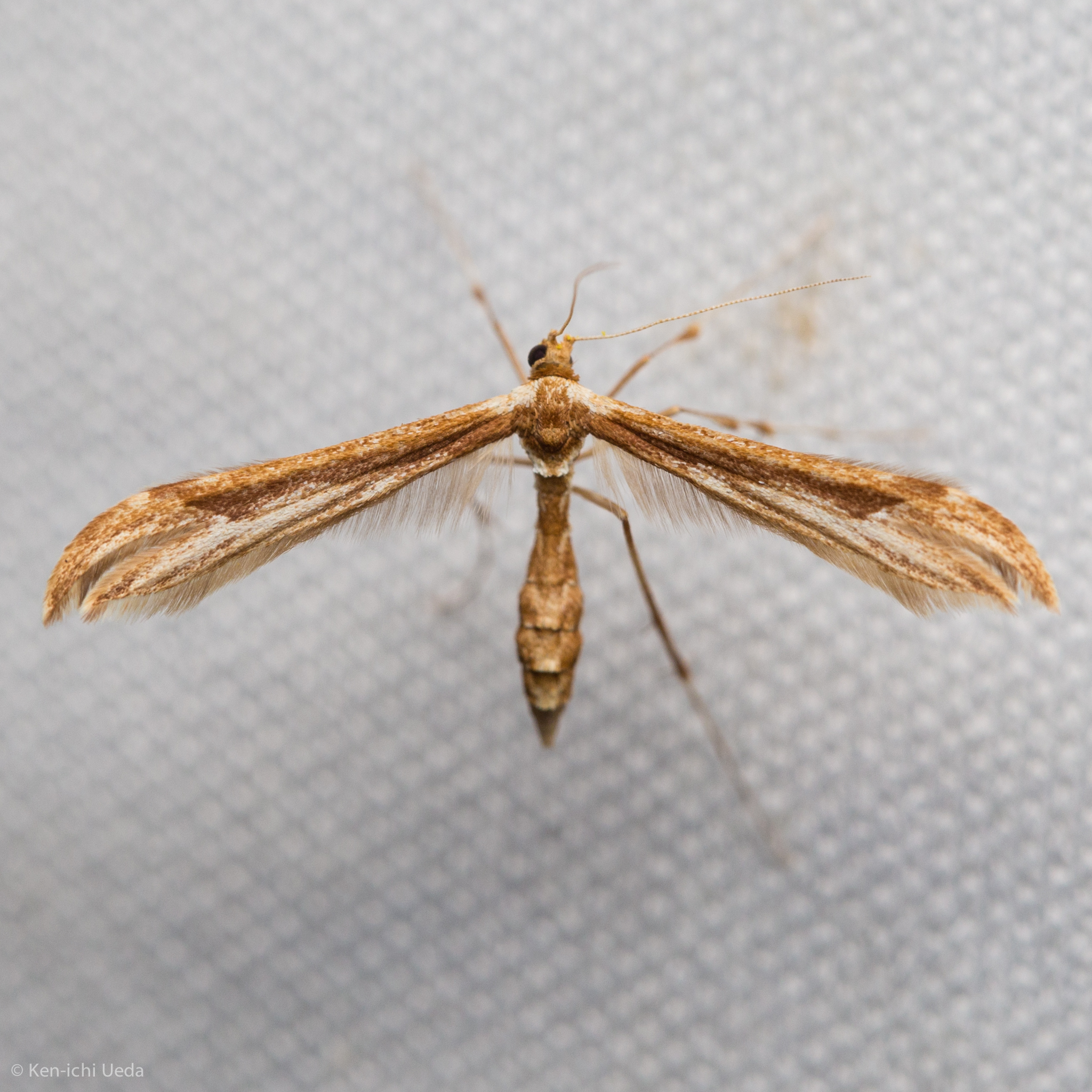

Scientific classification
- Domain: Eukaryota
- Kingdom: Animalia
- Phylum: Arthropoda
- Class: Insecta
- Order: Lepidoptera
- Family: Pterophoridae
- Genus: Hellinsia
- Species: H. fieldi

Binomial name
- Hellinsia fieldi (Wright, 1921)

Synonyms
- Pterophorus fieldi Wright, 1921

= Hellinsia fieldi =

Species of plume moth

Hellinsia fieldi is a moth of the family Pterophoridae. It is found in North America, including California.

The wingspan is 21–26 mm. The antennae are whitish with very fine brown annulations. The anterior part of the thorax is buff, spreading out into the base of the costa of the forewings. The thorax is dorsally brown, becoming lighter basally. The abdomen is light brownish buff on the anterior part with a red-brown squarish spot close to the base, becoming quite dark, almost seal-brown, mottled with lighter on the anal segments. The groundcolour of the forewings is white, the costal edge, discal area from the base to the cleft and the inner margin broadly brown streaked, the spaces between being more or less suffused with light brown scales. A dark brown costal streak is found just above the base of the cleft, connected broadly with the outer end of the discal streak, preceded and followed by white. Another brown costal streak is found at the base of the first lobe. The fringes are smoky with a whitish spot at the anal angle. They are darker within the cleft. The hindwings are dull smoky brown with a faint reddish tinge and darker fringes.

== Taxonomy ==
Some authors list Hellinsia meyricki as a synonym of Hellinsia fieldi.
