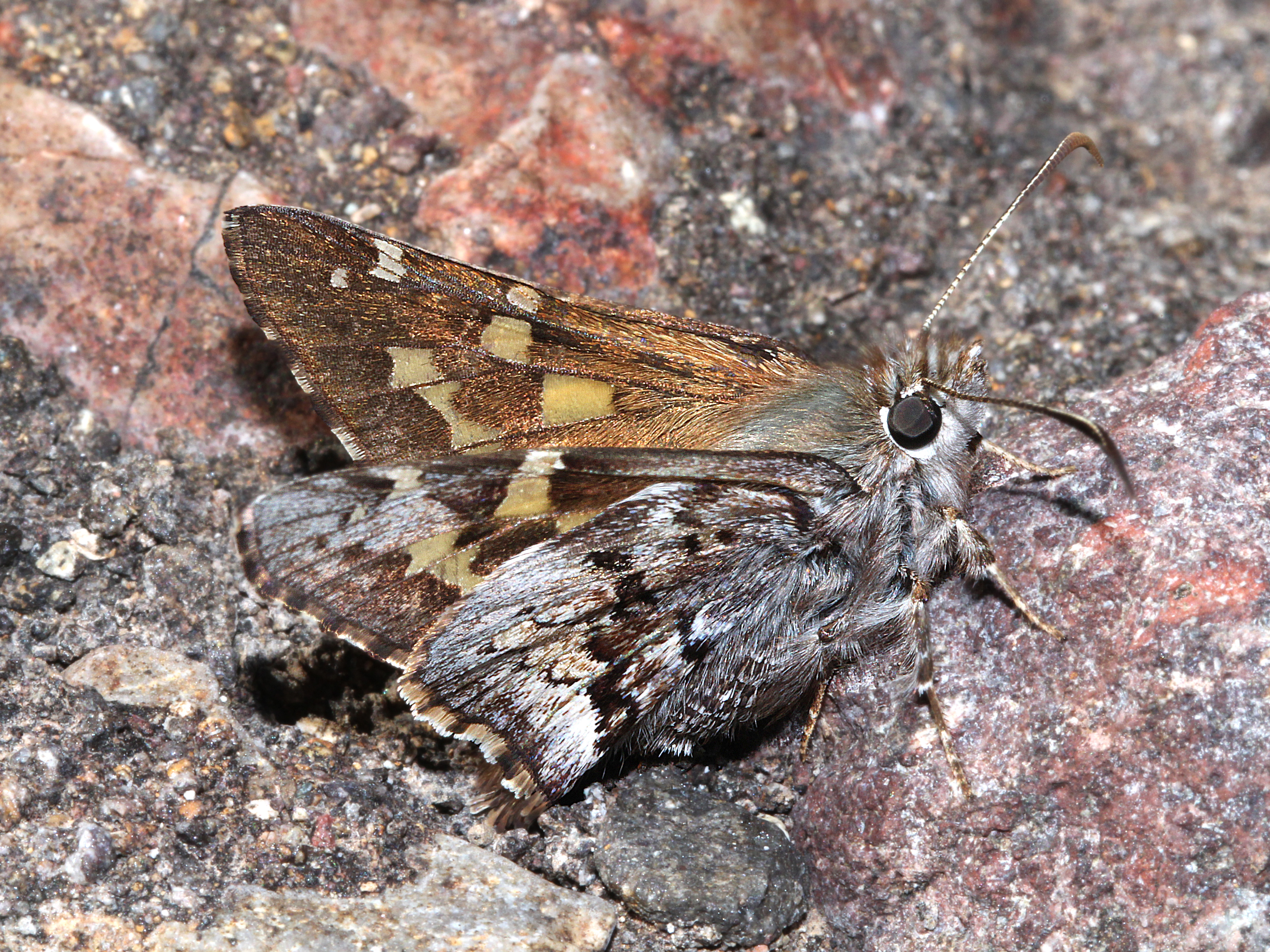
- In Arizona

Conservation status
- Secure (NatureServe)

Scientific classification
- Kingdom: Animalia
- Phylum: Arthropoda
- Clade: Pancrustacea
- Class: Insecta
- Order: Lepidoptera
- Family: Hesperiidae
- Genus: Zestusa
- Species: Z. dorus

Binomial name
- Zestusa dorus (W. H. Edwards, 1882)

= Zestusa dorus =

Species of butterfly

Zestusa dorus, the short-tailed skipper, is a species of dicot skipper in the butterfly family Hesperiidae. It is found in Central America and North America.
