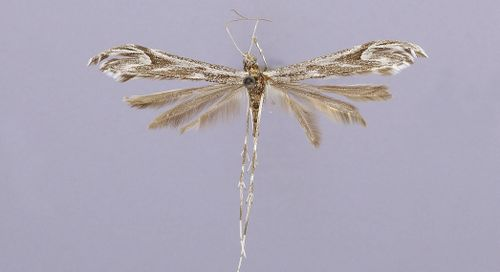

Scientific classification
- Domain: Eukaryota
- Kingdom: Animalia
- Phylum: Arthropoda
- Class: Insecta
- Order: Lepidoptera
- Family: Pterophoridae
- Genus: Hellinsia
- Species: H. mizar

Binomial name
- Hellinsia mizar (Barnes & Lindsey, 1921)

Synonyms
- Oidaematophorus mizar Barnes & Lindsey, 1921

= Hellinsia mizar =

Species of plume moth

Hellinsia mizar is a moth of the family Pterophoridae first described by William Barnes and Arthur Ward Lindsey in 1921. It is found in the US states of New Mexico and Arizona (including the type location, the Chiricahua Mountains).

The wingspan is 24–29 millimetres (0.94–1.14 in). The front of the thorax is brownish gray and the head is largely white. The thorax tipped behind with a V-shaped white mark. The first two segments of the abdomen have some black on the posterior margin, followed by white on the following segment. The remainder has white posterior margins. A lateral white line is present. The antennae are white with dark dots above. The legs are mostly white. The forewings are brownish gray with white streaks. The hindwings and their fringes are brownish gray.
