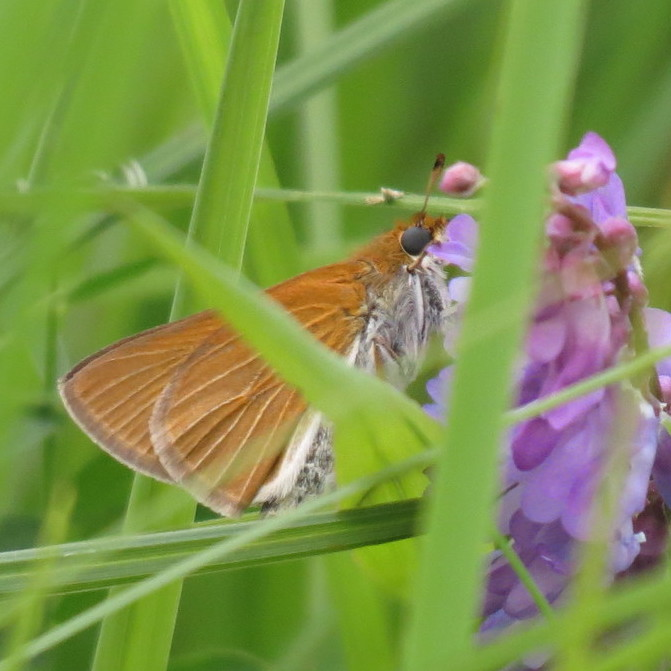

Conservation status
- Apparently Secure (NatureServe)

Scientific classification
- Kingdom: Animalia
- Phylum: Arthropoda
- Class: Insecta
- Order: Lepidoptera
- Family: Hesperiidae
- Genus: Euphyes
- Species: E. bimacula

Binomial name
- Euphyes bimacula (Grote & Robinson, 1867)

Synonyms
- Hesperia bimacula Grote & Robinson, 1867; Atrytone contradicta Leussler, 1933; Hesperia acanootus Scudder, 1868; Hesperia illinois Doge, 1872

= Euphyes bimacula =

Species of butterfly

Euphyes bimacula, the two-spotted skipper, is a butterfly of the family Hesperiidae. It is found in North America, from northeast Colorado and western Nebraska; eastern Nebraska east to southern Quebec; southern Maine south to central Virginia; coastal plain south to Georgia; and the Gulf Coast.

The wingspan is 25–30 mm. They are dark brown on the upperside and pale tawny orange beneath.

The larvae feed on Carex trichocarpa. Adults feed on nectar from flowers including pickerelweed, sweet pepperbush, blue flag, common milkweed, and spiraea.

The species is listed as endangered in Connecticut by state authorities.

== Subspecies ==
There are three subspecies of E. bimacula:

- E. b. arbotsti Gatrelle, 1999
- E. b. bimacula (Grote & Robinson, 1867)
- E. b. arbotsti (Dodge, 1872)
