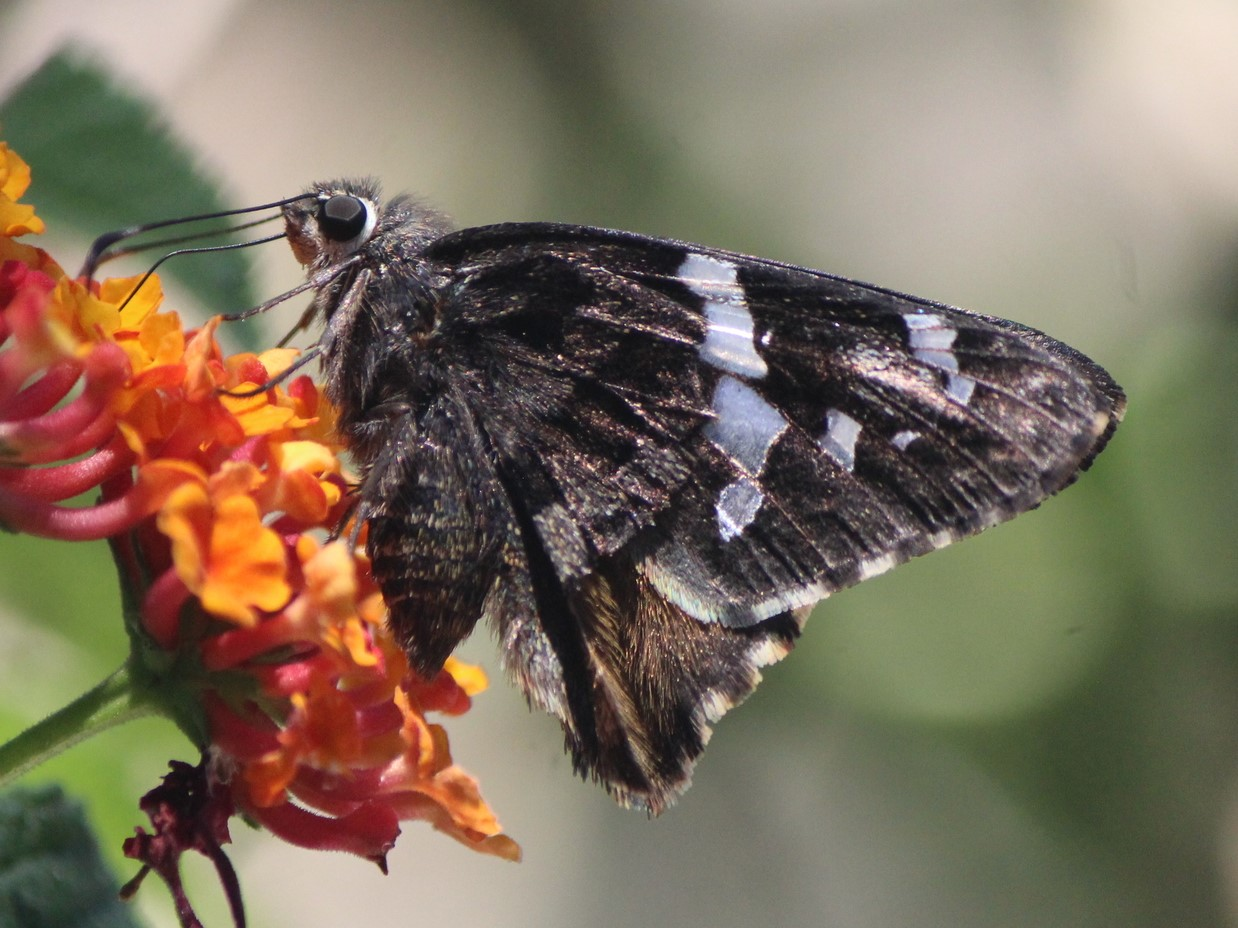

Scientific classification
- Kingdom: Animalia
- Phylum: Arthropoda
- Class: Insecta
- Order: Lepidoptera
- Family: Hesperiidae
- Genus: Codatractus
- Species: C. arizonensis

Binomial name
- Codatractus arizonensis (Skinner, 1905)

= Codatractus arizonensis =

Species of butterfly

Codatractus arizonensis, the Arizona skipper, is a species of dicot skipper in the family of butterflies known as Hesperiidae. It is found in Central America and North America.
