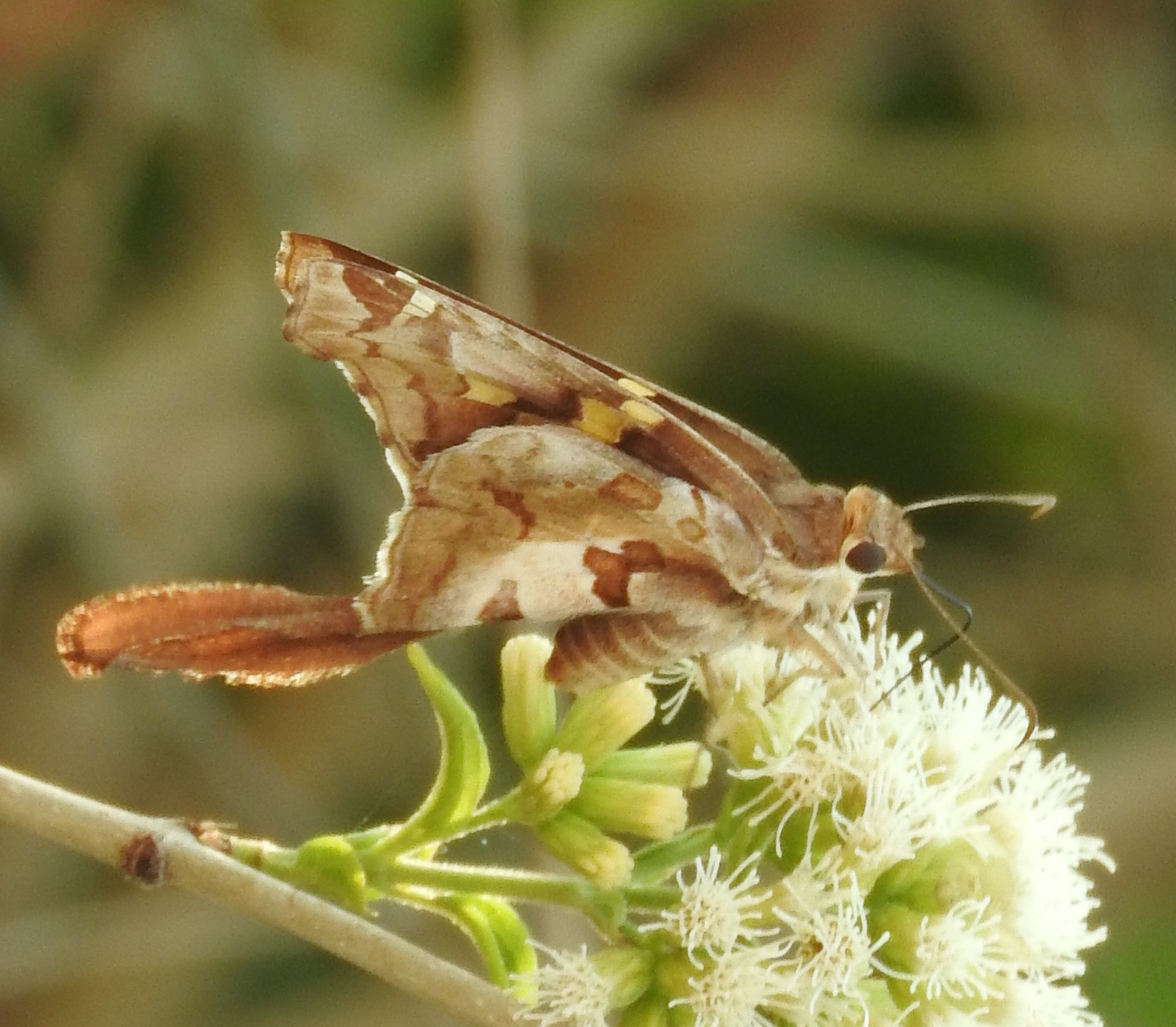

Scientific classification
- Kingdom: Animalia
- Phylum: Arthropoda
- Class: Insecta
- Order: Lepidoptera
- Family: Hesperiidae
- Genus: Chioides
- Species: C. zilpa

Binomial name
- Chioides zilpa (Butler, 1872)

Synonyms
- Chioides zilpa namba Evans, 1952

= Chioides zilpa =

Species of butterfly

Chioides zilpa, the zilpa longtail, is a species of dicot skipper in the butterfly family Hesperiidae. It is found in Central America, North America, and South America.
