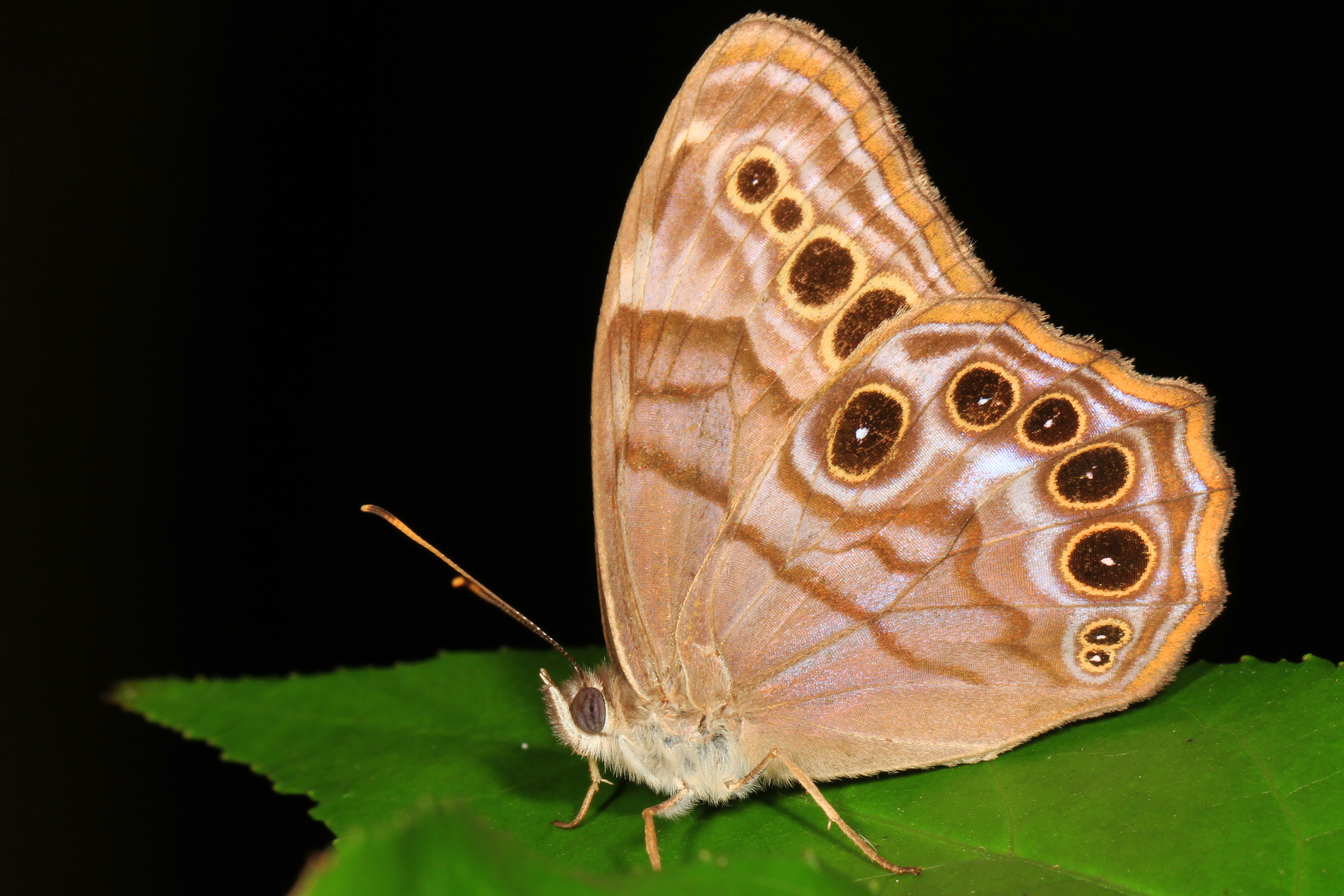

Conservation status
- Secure (NatureServe)

Scientific classification
- Kingdom: Animalia
- Phylum: Arthropoda
- Clade: Pancrustacea
- Class: Insecta
- Order: Lepidoptera
- Family: Nymphalidae
- Genus: Lethe
- Species: L. anthedon

Binomial name
- Lethe anthedon (A. Clark, 1936)

Synonyms
- Enodia anthedon (A. Clark, 1936)

= Lethe anthedon =

Species of butterfly

Lethe anthedon, the northern pearly-eye, is a species of butterfly in the subfamily Satyrinae of the family Nymphalidae. It is found in North America, from central Saskatchewan and eastern Nebraska east to Nova Scotia, south to central Alabama and Mississippi.

== Description ==
The wingspan is 1 1/2 to 2 1/2 inches (43–67 mm.) The upperside is brown with dark eyespots and the underside is brown. Adults feed on dung, fungi, carrion and sap from willows, poplars, and birches.

The larvae feed on various grasses, including Leersia virginica, Erianthus species, Muhlenbergia species, bearded shortgrass (Brachyelytrum erectum), Chasmanthium latifolium, bottlebrush grass (Hystrix patula), and false melic grass (Schizachne purpurascens). The host plants of a northern population include sedges (Carex species).

The species overwinters in the larval stage.

== Gallery ==
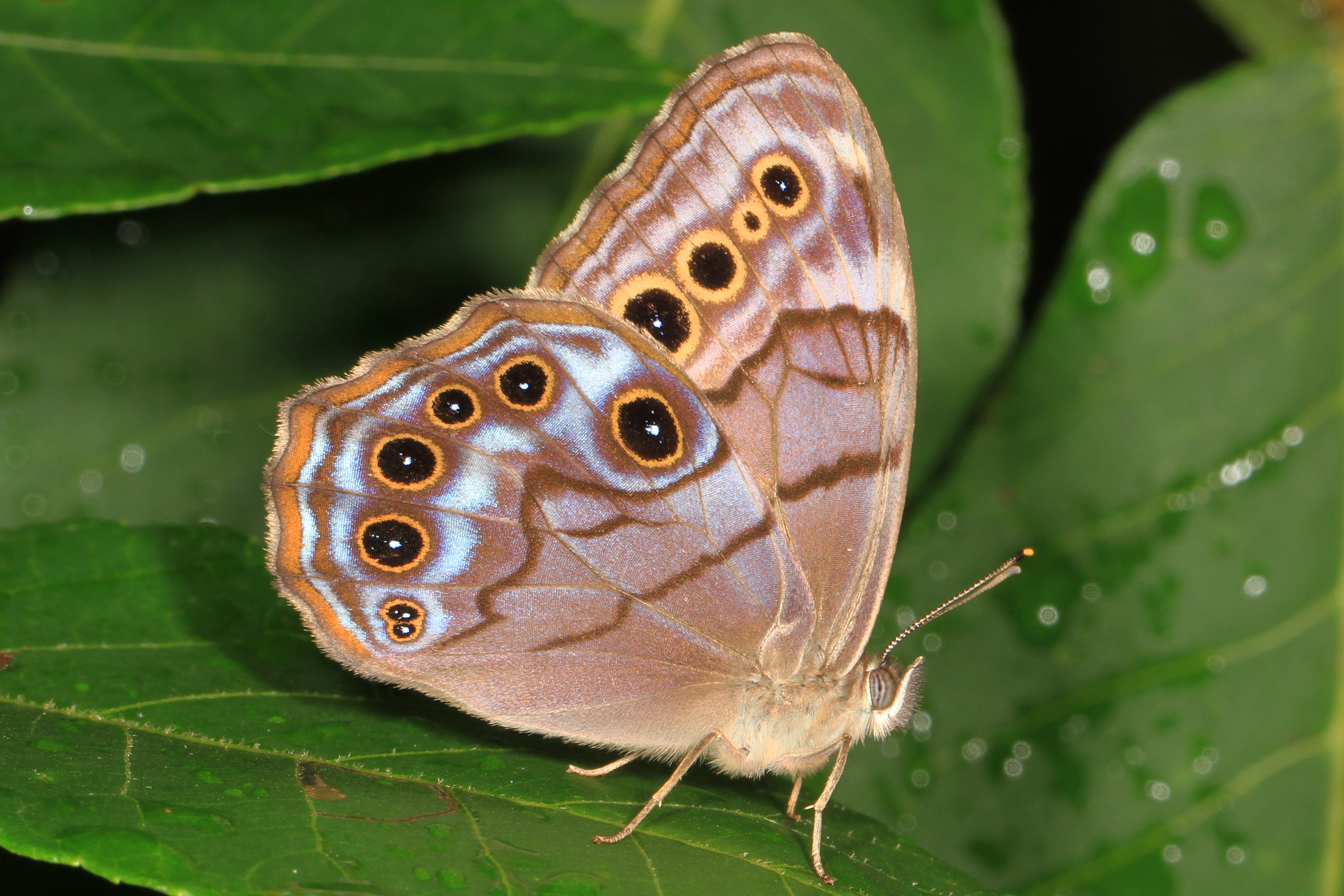
Northern Pearly-eye in Occoquan Bay National Wildlife Refuge, Woodbridge, Virginia

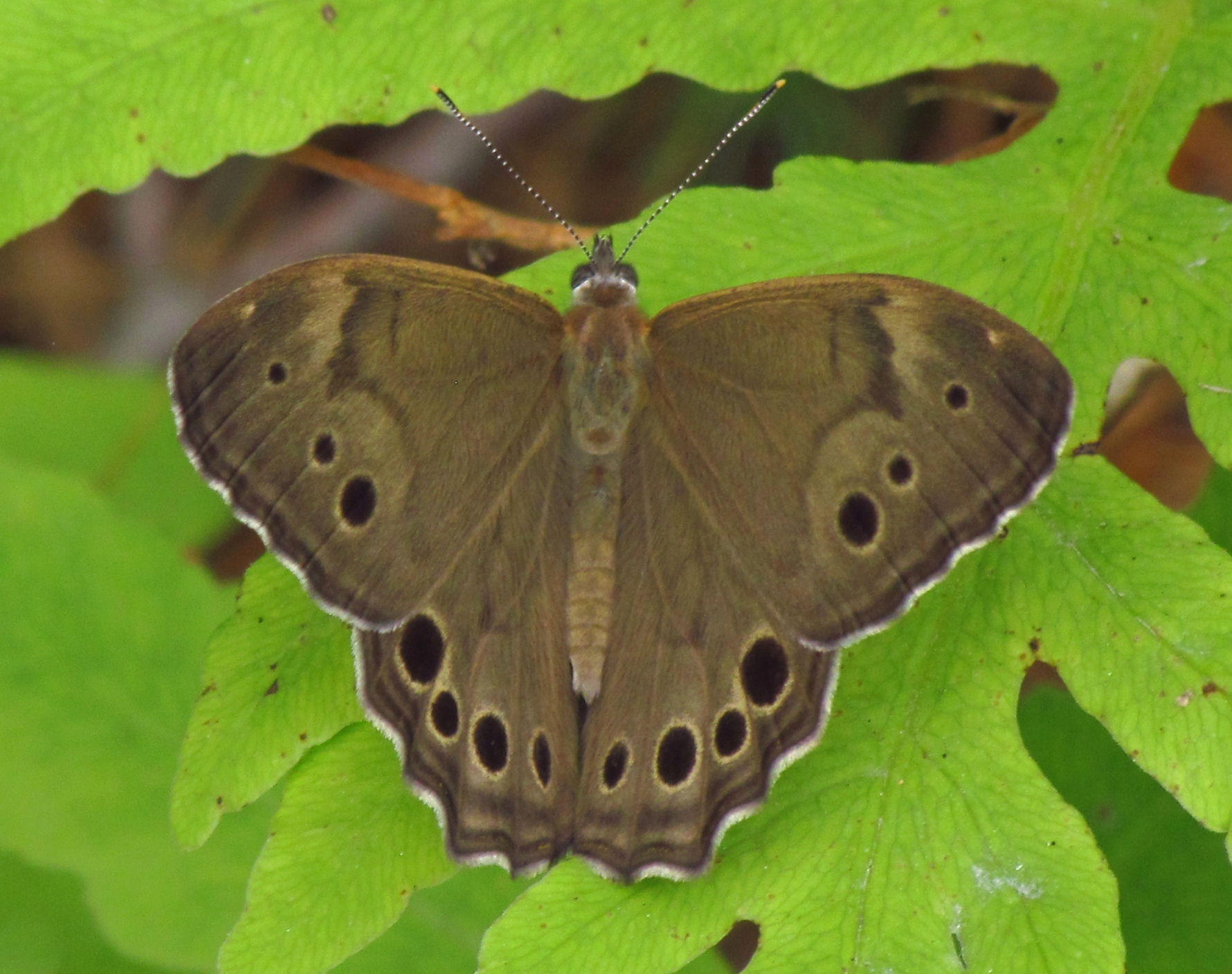
Dorsal view

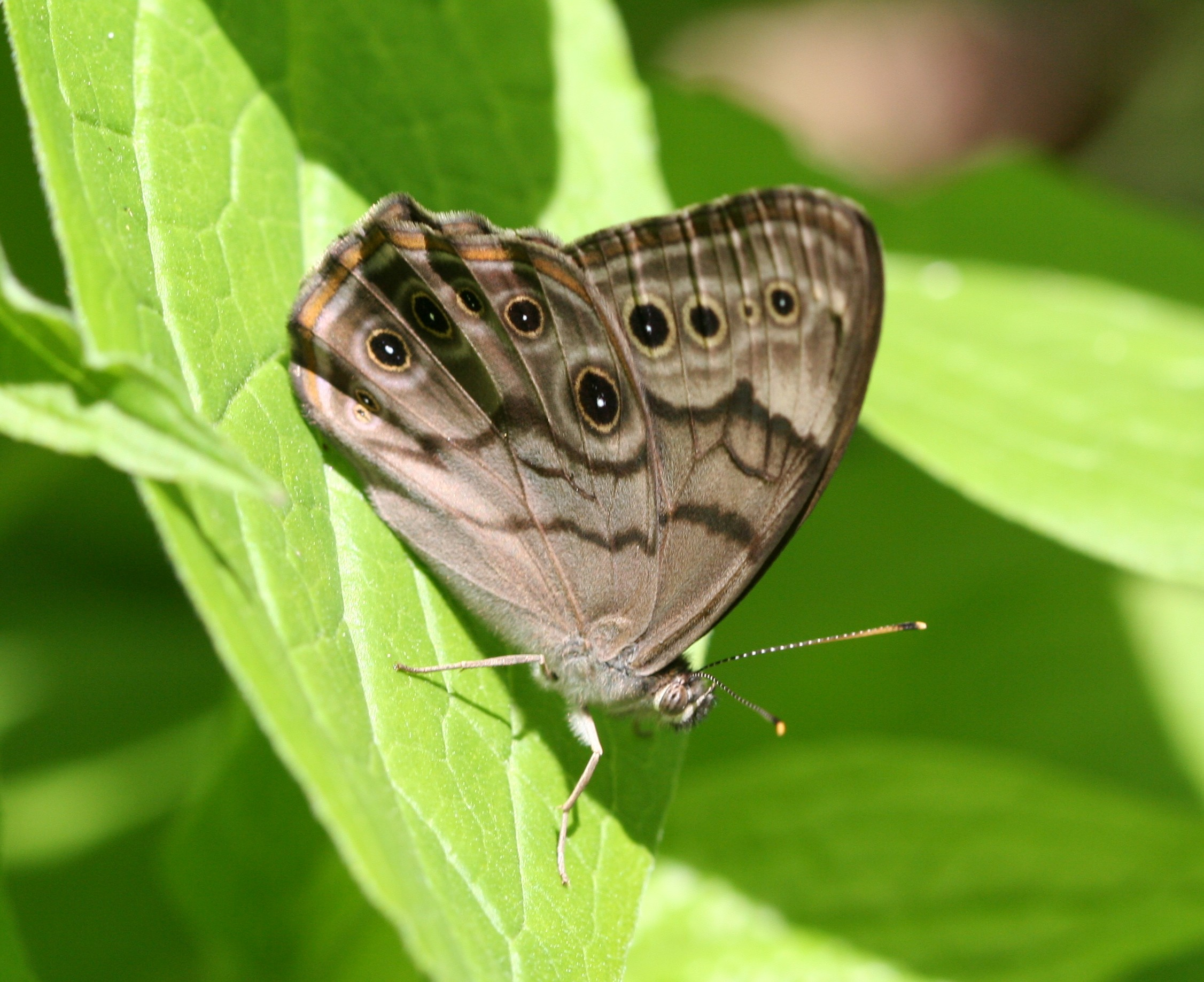
Ventral view

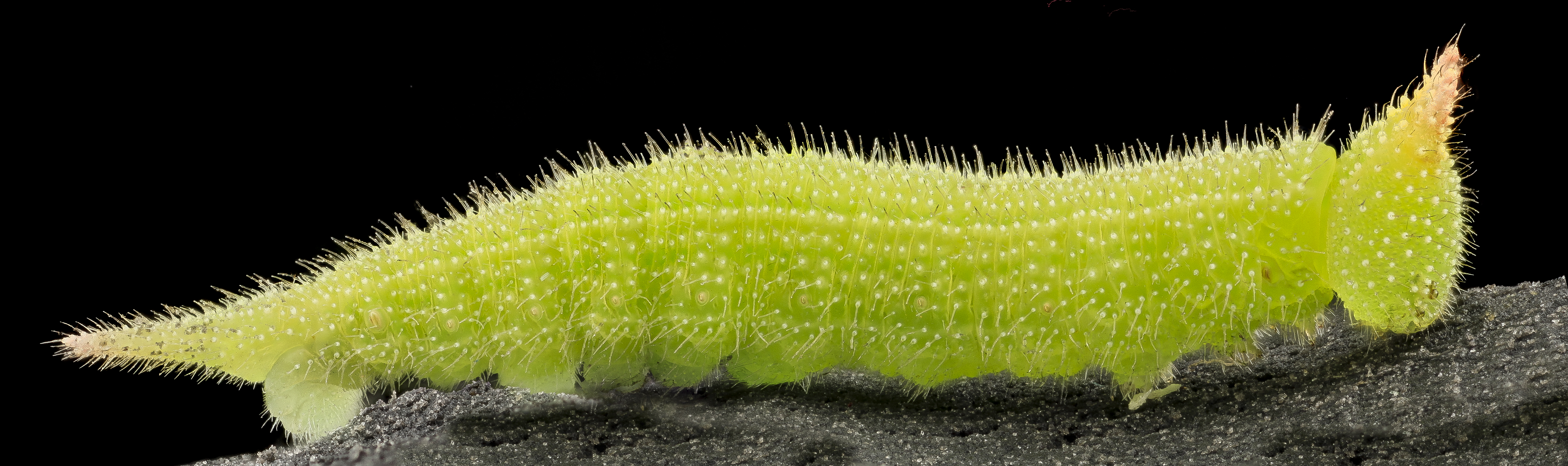
Larva

== Subspecies ==
- Lethe anthedon anthedon (A. Clark, 1936)
- Lethe anthedon borealis (A. Clark, 1936)

== Similar species ==
- Satyrodes appalachia / Lethe appalachia (R. L. Chermock, 1947) – Appalachian brown
- Satyrodes eurydice [Lethe eurydice] (Linnaeus, 1763) – eyed brown
