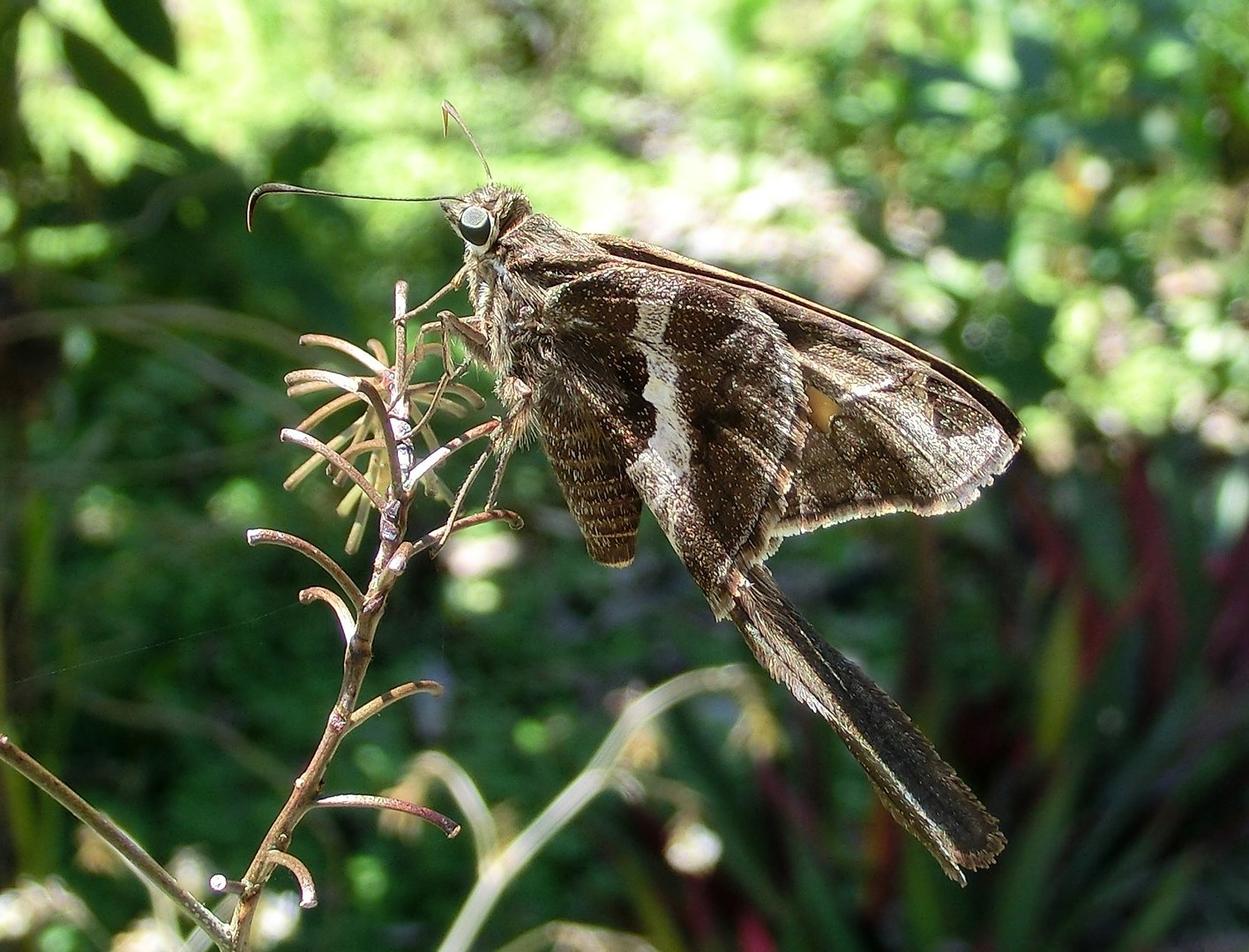

Conservation status
- Secure (NatureServe)

Scientific classification
- Kingdom: Animalia
- Phylum: Arthropoda
- Clade: Pancrustacea
- Class: Insecta
- Order: Lepidoptera
- Family: Hesperiidae
- Genus: Chioides
- Species: C. albofasciatus

Binomial name
- Chioides albofasciatus (Hewitson, 1867)

= Chioides albofasciatus =

Species of butterfly

Chioides albofasciatus, commonly known as the white-striped longtail, is a species of dicot skipper in the family of butterflies known as Hesperiidae. Chioides albofasciatus is found in Central America and North America.
