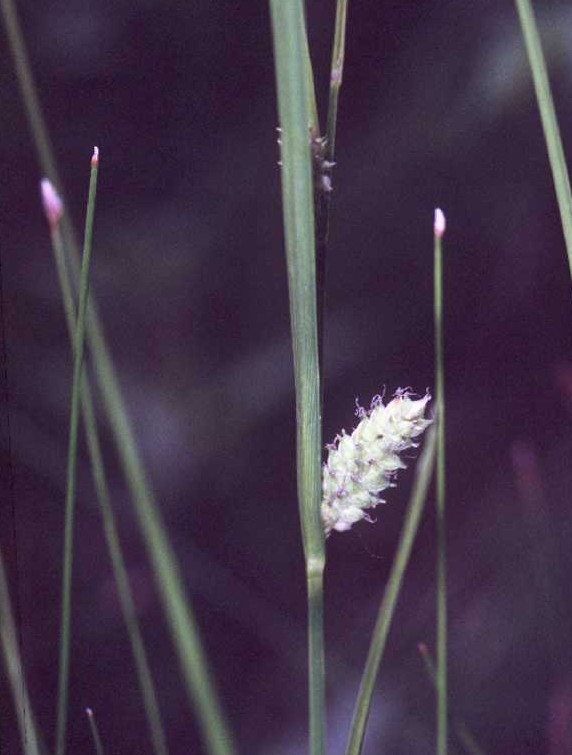

Conservation status
- Least Concern (IUCN 3.1)

Scientific classification
- Kingdom: Plantae
- Clade: Tracheophytes
- Clade: Angiosperms
- Clade: Monocots
- Clade: Commelinids
- Order: Poales
- Family: Cyperaceae
- Genus: Carex
- Subgenus: Carex subg. Carex
- Section: Carex sect. Paludosae
- Species: C. pellita

Binomial name
- Carex pellita Muhl. ex Willd.

Synonyms
- Diemisa pellita Muhl. ex Willd.

= Carex pellita =

Woolly sedge

Species of plant in the sedge family

Carex pellita is a species of sedge known by the common name woolly sedge.

== Distribution ==
This sedge is native to much of North America, including southern Canada, the United States, and northeastern Mexico.

== Description ==
Carex pellita grows in wet and dry areas in a number of habitat types, including disturbed areas such as ditches and roadsides. This sedge grows in colonies of individuals made up of clumps of stems 30 centimetres to one metre in height from a network of spreading rhizomes.

The inflorescence is up to 30 centimetres long, a cylindrical body of overlapping flowers. Female flowers have dark brown or purplish, hairy scales with long tips. The fruit is coated in a fuzzy to woolly perigynium.
