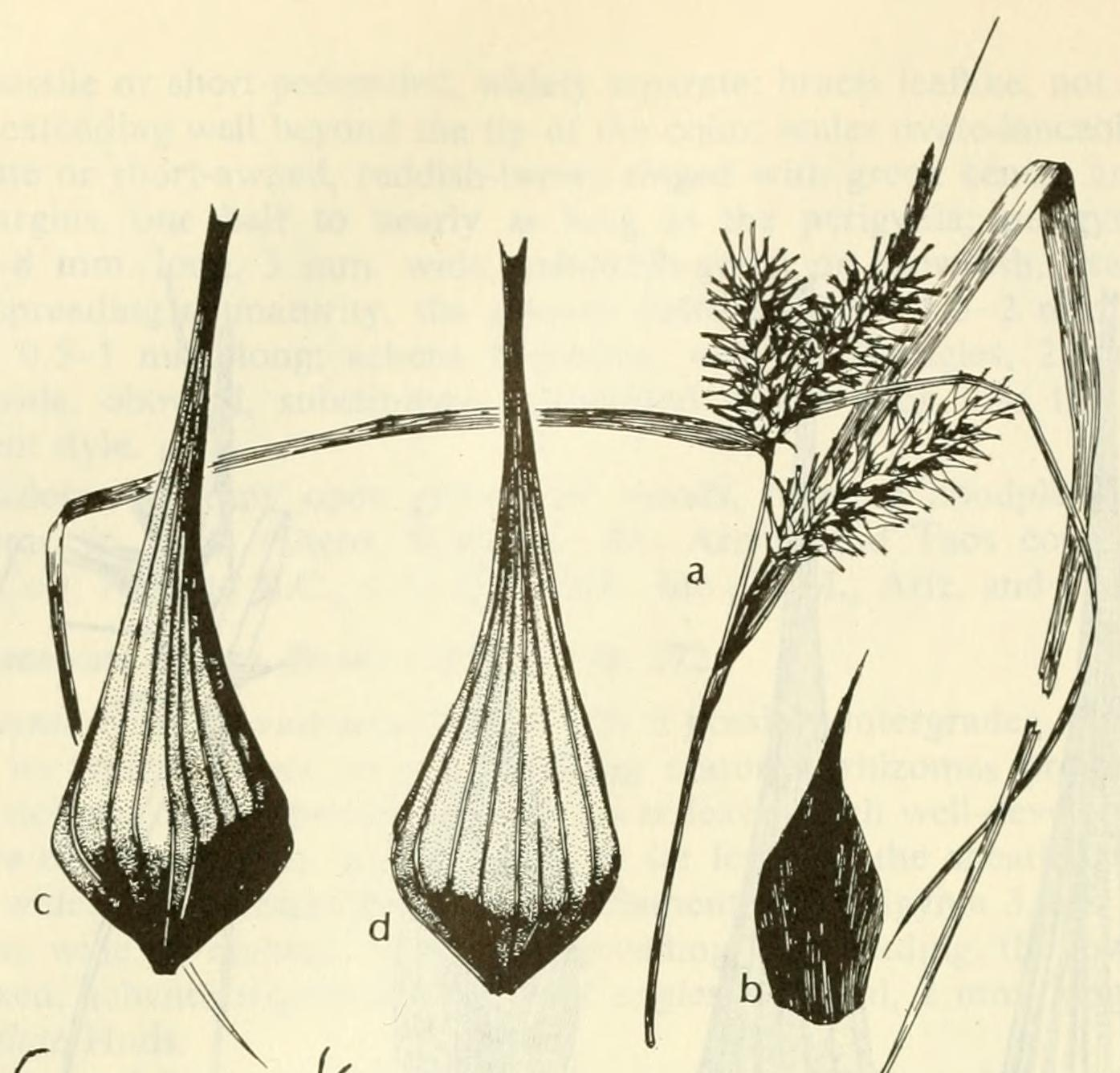
- Botanical illustration

Scientific classification
- Kingdom: Plantae
- Clade: Tracheophytes
- Clade: Angiosperms
- Clade: Monocots
- Clade: Commelinids
- Order: Poales
- Family: Cyperaceae
- Genus: Carex
- Species: C. gigantea

Binomial name
- Carex gigantea Rudge

Synonyms
- List: Carex gigantea var. grandis (L.H.Bailey) Farw.; Carex gigantea f. minor Farw.; Carex gigantea f. pedunculata (Dewey) Farw.; Carex grandis L.H.Bailey; Carex grandis var. helleri L.H.Bailey; Carex lacustris var. gigantea (Rudge) Pursh; Carex lupulina var. gigantea (Rudge) Britton; Carex lupulina var. pedunculata Dewey

= Carex gigantea =

Species of plant

Carex gigantea, the giant sedge, is a species of flowering plant in the family Cyperaceae, native to the southeastern U.S. and adjoining states. A perennial reaching 120 cm (4 ft), it is found at elevations from 0 to 400 m (0 to 1,300 ft) in swamps and wet clearings.
