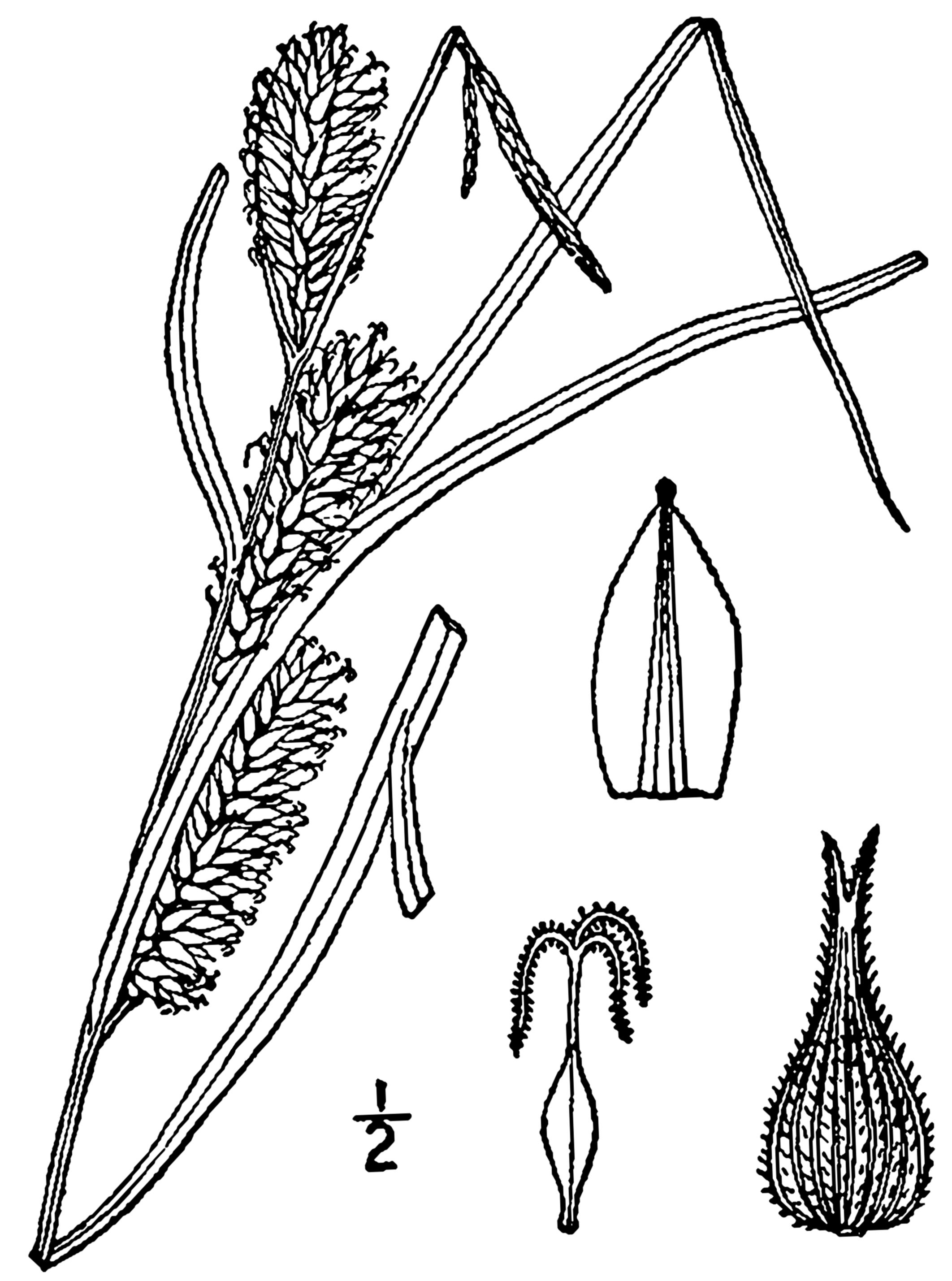

Conservation status
- Secure (NatureServe)

Scientific classification
- Kingdom: Plantae
- Clade: Embryophytes
- Clade: Tracheophytes
- Clade: Spermatophytes
- Clade: Angiosperms
- Clade: Monocots
- Clade: Commelinids
- Order: Poales
- Family: Cyperaceae
- Genus: Carex
- Subgenus: Carex subg. Carex
- Section: Carex sect. Carex
- Species: C. trichocarpa

Binomial name
- Carex trichocarpa Muhl. ex Willd.

= Carex trichocarpa =

Species of grass-like plant

Carex trichocarpa, the hairy-fruited sedge, is a species of Carex native to North America. It is listed as a "species of special concern" in Connecticut, the United States. The larvae of Euphyes bimacula, the two-spotted skipper, feed on the plant. E. bimacula is listed as endangered in Connecticut.

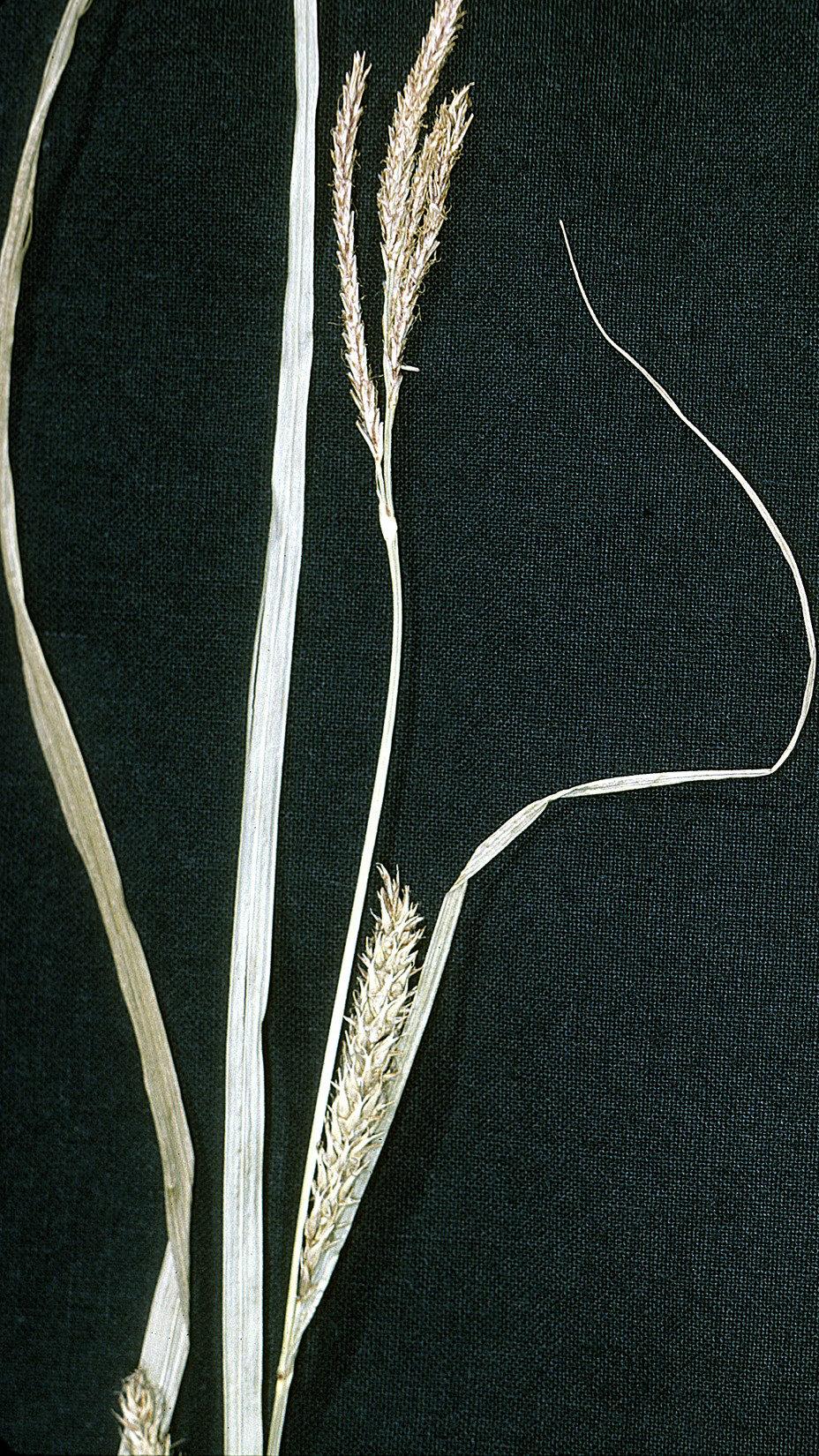
Carex trichocarpa
