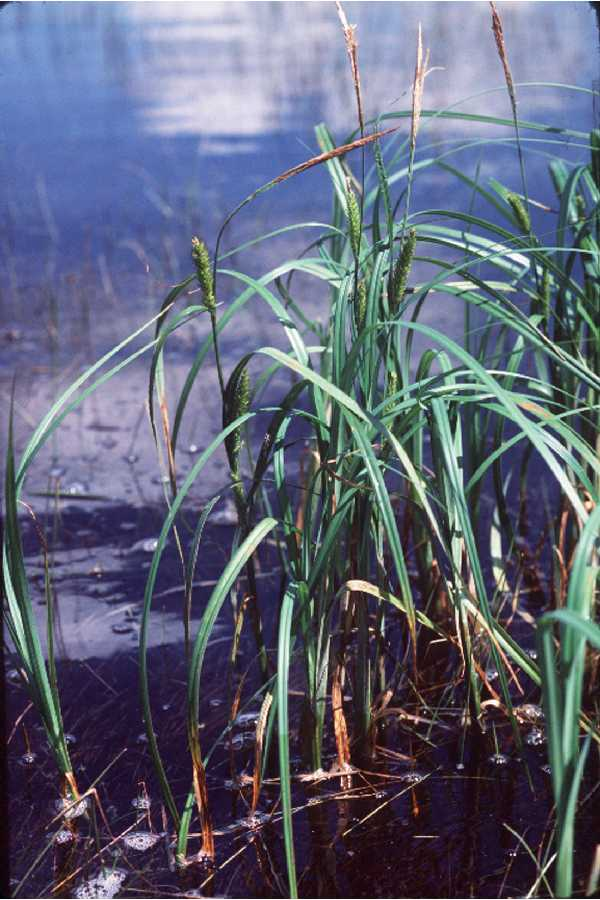

Conservation status
- Least Concern (IUCN 3.1)

Scientific classification
- Kingdom: Plantae
- Clade: Tracheophytes
- Clade: Angiosperms
- Clade: Monocots
- Clade: Commelinids
- Order: Poales
- Family: Cyperaceae
- Genus: Carex
- Species: C. atherodes

Binomial name
- Carex atherodes Spreng.

= Carex atherodes =

Species of grass-like plant

Carex atherodes is a species of sedge known by the common name wheat sedge. It is native to Eurasia and much of North America including most of Canada and the United States. It is a very common wetland plant across the American Midwest and areas west. It grows in moist and wet habitat, such as marshes and moist prairie land, and it may grow in shallow water. This sedge produces triangular, hollow stems 30 to 120 centimeters tall. The leaves are hairy, especially on the lower parts, and the leaf sheath is tinted with reddish purple. The inflorescence is up to 60 centimeters long and made up of several spikes; those spikes near the tip are usually staminate, and those lower in the inflorescence are usually pistillate. The tip of each fruit has two or more long, thin teeth.
