= Arthur Ward Lindsey =

American entomologist (1894–1963)

Arthur Ward Lindsey (January 11, 1894 – March 8, 1963) was an American entomologist.

Arthur Ward Lindsey was born in Council Bluffs, Iowa. He was educated at Morningside College in Sioux City gaining his Bachelor of Arts in 1916. Collecting butterflies from his youth, he published his first publication (The Butterflies of Woodbury County) in 1914.

For his PhD he studied the private Lepidoptera collection of William Barnes (1860–1930) in Decatur, Illinois. That began a friendship with James Halliday McDunnough (1877-1962) Barnes curator. In 1919, he defended his doctoral thesis The Hesperioidea of America, North of Mexico. The same year, he replaced McDunnough as curator at Decatur, a function he held until 1921. Barnes and Lindsey published in the same year a revision of the Pterophoroidea. Lindsey was the main author.

After teaching at Morningside College, in 1922 he became a professor and the director of the Department of Zoology of Denison University in Granville, Ohio. He retained these functions until his retirement in 1960. He died in Lancaster, Ohio.

Lindsey was the author of many works on the Hesperioidea, including a revision of his thesis in 1931 under the title Hesperiidae of North America with Roswell Carter Williams Jr. (1869–1946) and Ernest Layton Bell (1876–1964). He was also the author of five books on zoology as well as on genetics and evolution. He also directed the publication, from 1945 to 1948 of the Annals of the Entomological Society of America. His collection of 6,000 specimens and 28 types is maintained by the Carnegie Museum of Natural History in Pittsburgh.

== Publications ==
- Textbook of Evolution and Genetics (1929)
- The Hesperioidea of North America (1931)
- The Problems of Evolution (1931)
- A Textbook of Genetics (1932)
- The Science of Animal Life (1939)
- Principles of Organic Evolution (1952)
