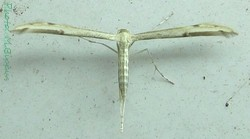

Scientific classification
- Kingdom: Animalia
- Phylum: Arthropoda
- Class: Insecta
- Order: Lepidoptera
- Family: Pterophoridae
- Tribe: Oidaematophorini
- Genus: Oidaematophorus; Wallengren, 1862

Synonyms
- Ovendenia Tutt, 1905

= Oidaematophorus =

Plume moth genus

Oidaematophorus is a genus of moths in the family Pterophoridae with a cosmopolitan distribution.

== Ecology ==
Host plants mainly belong to the Asteraceae.

== Species ==
- Oidaematophorus balsamorrhizae
- Oidaematophorus baroni
- Oidaematophorus borbonicus
- Oidaematophorus brucei
- Oidaematophorus castor
- Oidaematophorus catalinae
- Oidaematophorus cineraceus
- Oidaematophorus constanti
- Oidaematophorus cretidactylus
- Oidaematophorus downesi
- Oidaematophorus eupatorii
- Oidaematophorus giganteus
- Oidaematophorus grandis
- Oidaematophorus grisescens
- Oidaematophorus guttatus
- Oidaematophorus iwatensis
- Oidaematophorus kellicottii
- Oidaematophorus lindseyi
- Oidaematophorus lithodactyla
- Oidaematophorus madecasseus
- Oidaematophorus mathewianus
- Oidaematophorus mauritius
- Oidaematophorus mineti
- Oidaematophorus negus
- Oidaematophorus nigrofuscus
- Oidaematophorus occidentalis
- Oidaematophorus parshuramus
- Oidaematophorus phaceliae
- Oidaematophorus pseudotrachyphloeus
- Oidaematophorus rileyi
- Oidaematophorus rogenhoferi
- Oidaematophorus trachyphloeus
- Oidaematophorus vafradactylus

== Former species ==
- Oidaematophorus beneficus
