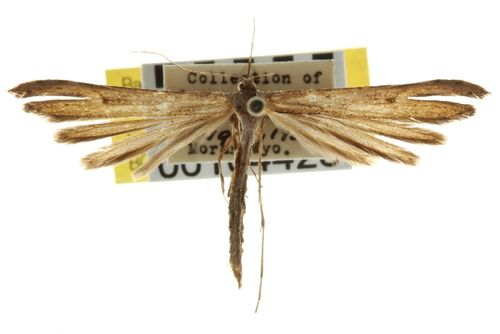

Scientific classification
- Kingdom: Animalia
- Phylum: Arthropoda
- Clade: Pancrustacea
- Class: Insecta
- Order: Lepidoptera
- Family: Pterophoridae
- Genus: Oidaematophorus
- Species: O. cineraceus

Binomial name
- Oidaematophorus cineraceus (Fish, 1881)

Synonyms
- Oedaematophorus cineraceus Fish, 1881; Oedaematophorus lugubris Fish, 1881

= Oidaematophorus cineraceus =

Species of plume moth

Oidaematophorus cineraceus is a moth of the family Pterophoridae. It is found in North America (including Washington, California and British Columbia).

The wingspan is 27–29 millimetres (1.1–1.1 in). The front of the head is dark greyish brown. The palpi are greyish brown and the antennae are cinereous, dotted above with dark brown. The abdomen is cinereous, marked with reddish-brown scales. The forewings are cinereous, tinged with brownish, and very thinly sprinkled with dark-brown scales. These scales form a median spot before the base of the fissure, bordered on the outside with white. A longitudinal brown spot occurs on the costa opposite the base of the fissure, and two smaller ones toward the apex. The fringes are brownish cinereous. The hindwings and fringes are brownish cinereous.
