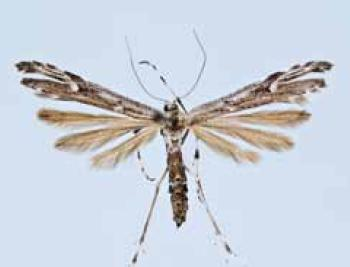

Scientific classification
- Kingdom: Animalia
- Phylum: Arthropoda
- Clade: Pancrustacea
- Class: Insecta
- Order: Lepidoptera
- Family: Pterophoridae
- Genus: Oidaematophorus
- Species: O. grisescens

Binomial name
- Oidaematophorus grisescens (Walsingham, 1880)

Synonyms
- Oedaematophorus grisescens Walsingham, 1880; Pterophorus acrias Meyrick, 1908; Pterophorus behrii Grinnell, 1908

= Oidaematophorus grisescens =

Species of plume moth

Oidaematophorus grisescens is a moth of the family Pterophoridae. It is found in North America (including California, Colorado, Oregon, Montana, British Columbia and Alberta) and Mexico.

The wingspan is 20–29 millimetres (0.79–1.14 in). The head and palpi are grey, with a fuscous tinge on the apex of the palpi. The antennae are spotted with grey and fuscous. The thorax and abdomen are greyish, sprinkled with fuscous. The legs are greyish white, tinged on the segments and on the tips of the spurs with fuscous. The forewings are grey, slightly spotted with white and dusted with fuscous scales, the hind portion touched with ferruginous. There is a white space on the costa before the base of the fissure, and another beyond and obliquely connected by whitish scales with the base of the fissure. There is also a whitish spot before the middle of the hind margin and an indistinct fuscous spot above it. The fringes are mottled with white and greyish fuscous. The hindwings are cinereous and the fringes whitish mixed with grey.

The larvae feed on the leaves of Artemisia species, including Artemisia tridentata and Artemisia vulgaris.
