= Oidaematophorus iwatensis =

Scientific classification
- Kingdom: Animalia
- Phylum: Arthropoda
- Clade: Pancrustacea
- Class: Insecta
- Order: Lepidoptera
- Family: Pterophoridae
- Genus: Oidaematophorus
- Species: O. iwatensis

Binomial name
- Oidaematophorus iwatensis (Matsumura, 1931)

Synonyms
- Pterophorus iwatensis Matsumura, 1931

Species of plume moth

Oidaematophorus iwatensis is a moth of the family Pterophoridae that is known from Japan (Honshu), Korea and China.

The wingspan is 26–27 millimetres (1.0–1.1 in) and the length of the forewings is 13–15 millimetres (0.51–0.59 in).

== Taxonomy ==
It was formerly listed as a synonym of Oidaematophorus lithodactylus.
