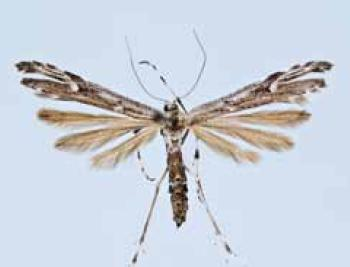

Scientific classification
- Kingdom: Animalia
- Phylum: Arthropoda
- Clade: Pancrustacea
- Class: Insecta
- Order: Lepidoptera
- Family: Pterophoridae
- Genus: Oidaematophorus
- Species: O. guttatus

Binomial name
- Oidaematophorus guttatus (Walsingham, 1880)

Synonyms
- Oedaematophorus guttatus Walsingham, 1880

= Oidaematophorus guttatus =

Species of plume moth

Oidaematophorus guttatus is a moth of the family Pterophoridae. It is found in the United States (including California, Colorado, Utah and Arizona).

The wingspan is about 25 millimetres (0.98 in). The head and palpi are whitish, sprinkled with cinereous, although the palpi are fuscous at the sides. The thorax and abdomen are whitish cinereous. The forewings are whitish cinereous, paler at the base and dusted with fuscous scales toward the costa and the hind margin. There is a white spot, generally bordered on the inner edge by two fuscous scales, located at the base of the fissure. Another similar spot is sometimes indicated before the middle of the hind margin. The fringes of the outer margin and fissure are cinereous fuscous, slightly interrupted with whitish. The hindwings are pale cinereous and the fringes paler.
