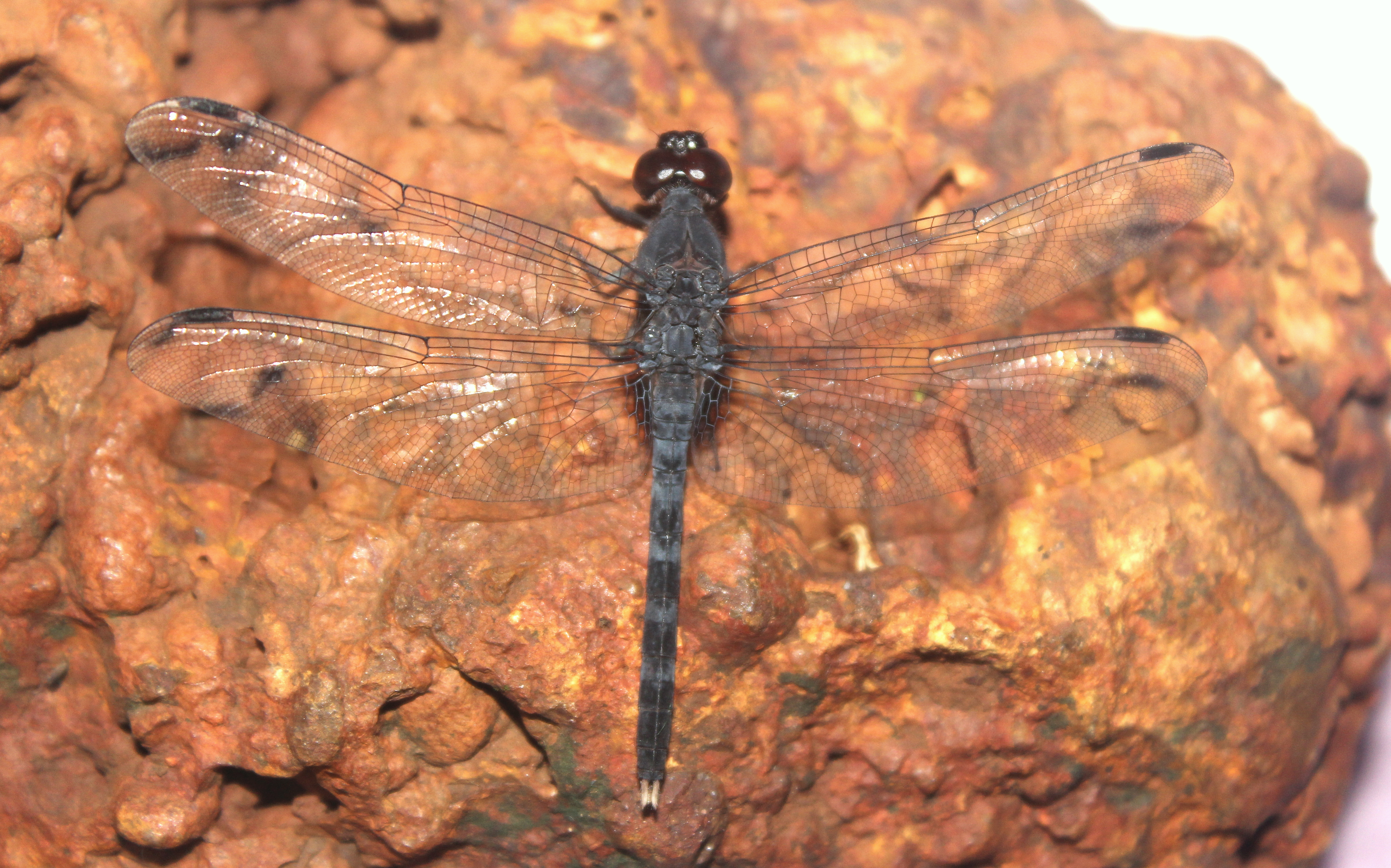
- Male

Scientific classification
- Domain: Eukaryota
- Kingdom: Animalia
- Phylum: Arthropoda
- Class: Insecta
- Order: Odonata
- Infraorder: Anisoptera
- Family: Libellulidae
- Genus: Bradinopyga
- Species: B. konkanensis

Binomial name
- Bradinopyga konkanensis Joshi & Sawant, 2020

= Bradinopyga konkanensis =

Species of dragonfly

Bradinopyga konkanensis is a species of dragonfly in the family Libellulidae known commonly as the Konkan rockdweller. It is endemic to the Western Coastal Plains of India.

== Description and habitat ==
It is a medium-sized dragonfly with brown-capped grey eyes. Its thorax is dark blue, pruinosed in adults. Wings are transparent with dual color pterostigma, black at centre and dark brown at distal and proximal ends. Base of wings are brown. Abdomen is black, pruinosed with blue, making the brown marks faintly visible. Anal appendages are brown, darker at the apices. Female is similar to the male.

This species is similar to Bradinopyga geminata; but can be distinguished by the pruinosed body colours, dark wing base and the difference in bi-coloured pterostigma.

Taking advantage of its cryptic coloration, it always rests flat on laterite, rock or cement-plastered walls, where it almost invisible.

== See also ==
- List of odonates of India
- List of odonata of Kerala
