= Oidaematophorus baroni =

Scientific classification
- Kingdom: Animalia
- Phylum: Arthropoda
- Clade: Pancrustacea
- Class: Insecta
- Order: Lepidoptera
- Family: Pterophoridae
- Genus: Oidaematophorus
- Species: O. baroni

Binomial name
- Oidaematophorus baroni (Fish, 1881)

Synonyms
- Oedaematophorus baroni Fish, 1881

Species of plume moth

Oidaematophorus baroni is a moth of the family Pterophoridae that is found in North America (including California and New York).

The wingspan is about 30 millimetres (1.2 in). The front of the head is brownish cinereous. The antennae are pale cinereous, dotted above with dark brown. The thorax and abdomen are pale brownish cinereous, the latter marked dorsally by a row of fine black dots on each segment beyond the third. The forewings are brownish cinereous, ochreous on the inner margin and second lobe, the whole surface sprinkled with fine black scales. The fringes are concolorous with the wings. The hindwings and fringes are dark cinereous.

== California distribution ==
The species can be found in Alameda, where it was first recorded on September 22, 1949. Following by a sighting in Kensington, Contra Costa, on December 19, 1960, and Cambria, San Luis Obispo on June 13, 1993. It was also found on the island of Santa Cruz, in Central Valley of Santa Barbara on June 9, 1966.
