= Antaeotricha graphopterella =

Scientific classification
- Kingdom: Animalia
- Phylum: Arthropoda
- Class: Insecta
- Order: Lepidoptera
- Family: Depressariidae
- Genus: Antaeotricha
- Species: A. graphopterella

Binomial name
- Antaeotricha graphopterella (Walker, 1864)

Synonyms
- Cryptolechia graphopterella Walker, 1864; Cryptolechia crocuta Felder & Rogenhofer, 1875

Species of moth

Antaeotricha graphopterella is a moth in the family Depressariidae. It was described by Francis Walker in 1864. It is found in Amazonas, Brazil.

Adults are a pale cinereous-fawn colour, the forewings of which have three blackish oblique streaks; the first and second streaks zigzag but the first extends from the middle of the base more obliquely than the second and than the third. There is a row of black points along the exterior border and along the adjacent part of the costa. The hindwings are brown with the fringe paler.
