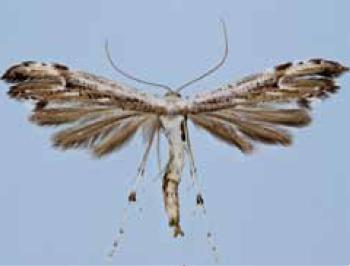

Scientific classification
- Kingdom: Animalia
- Phylum: Arthropoda
- Clade: Pancrustacea
- Class: Insecta
- Order: Lepidoptera
- Family: Pterophoridae
- Genus: Oidaematophorus
- Species: O. eupatorii

Binomial name
- Oidaematophorus eupatorii (Fernald, 1891)

Synonyms
- Alucita eupatorii Fernald, 1891

= Oidaematophorus eupatorii =

Species of plume moth

Oidaematophorus eupatorii, the eupatorium plume moth or Joe Pye plume moth, is a moth of the family Pterophoridae. It is found in North America, including Florida, Mississippi, Iowa, New York, California and Vancouver Island. It is also known from Mexico, Guatemala and Panama.

The wingspan is about 21–24 millimetres (0.83–0.94 in). The head is dull reddish brown and the thorax is pale brown. The legs are brown. The forewings are pale ocher yellow, whitest on the costal portion, and sprinkled with dark-brown scales to such an extent as to give them a wood-brown color. These dark-brown scales form a spot, nearly reaching a dark-brown costal streak over the end of the fissure, beyond which are two costal dark-brown spots, the first of which is the smaller. The fringes are smoke brown, cut with whitish once on the first lobe and twice on the outer margin of the hind lobe. The hindwings and fringes are brownish cinereous.

The larvae are greenish, striped with wine color and white, and feed on Eupatorium species (including Eupatorium purpurascens) and Epilobium species.
