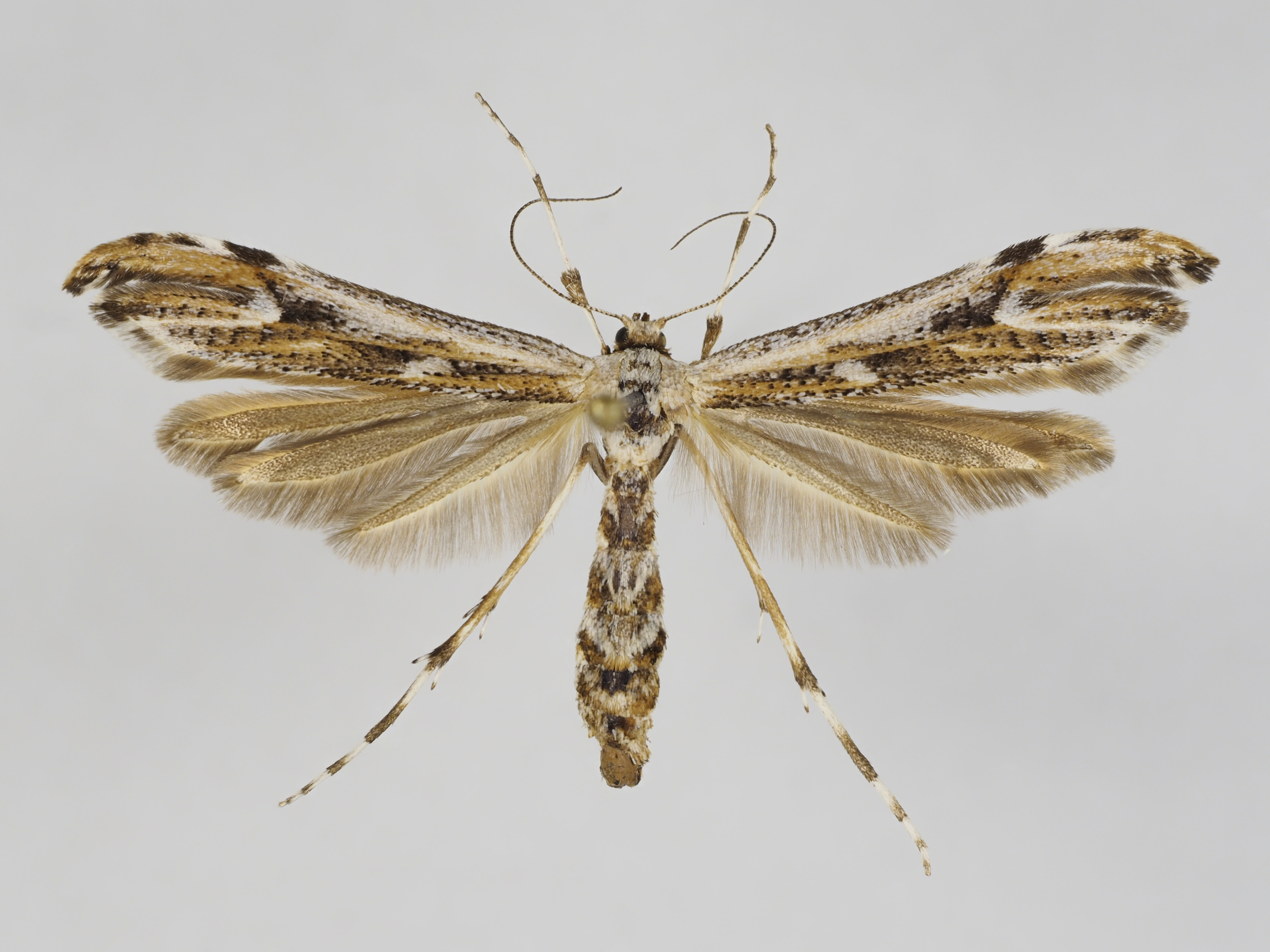

Scientific classification
- Kingdom: Animalia
- Phylum: Arthropoda
- Clade: Pancrustacea
- Class: Insecta
- Order: Lepidoptera
- Family: Pterophoridae
- Genus: Oidaematophorus
- Species: O. rogenhoferi

Binomial name
- Oidaematophorus rogenhoferi Mann, 1871

Synonyms
- Pterophorus rogenhoferi Mann, 1871; Oidaematophorus alaskensis Barnes & Lindsey, 1921

= Oidaematophorus rogenhoferi =

Species of plume moth

Oidaematophorus rogenhoferi is a species of moth in the family Pterophoridae. It is found in Spain, France, Italy, Switzerland, Austria, Germany and Fennoscandia. It is also known from North America and the South Siberian Mountains.

== Description ==
The species have a wingspan of 30–32 millimetres (1.2–1.3 in), and are brownish grey. The left valve of the male genitalia is wider than the right. Both valves are rounded. Their saccular spine from the left is longer than in Oidaematophorus lithodactyla. The female has Ostium that is located over the axis of the antrum.

The larvae feed on bitter fleabane (Erigeron acer), alpine fleabane (Erigeron alpinus) and Erigeron glabratus.

== Diet by country ==
In France, the species fly from July to August, where they also bred upon Erigeron acer angulosus. In Austria they feed on Erigeron alpinus, while in Norway they can't resist the taste of Erigeron acer politus.
