= Oidaematophorus giganteus =

Scientific classification
- Kingdom: Animalia
- Phylum: Arthropoda
- Clade: Pancrustacea
- Class: Insecta
- Order: Lepidoptera
- Family: Pterophoridae
- Genus: Oidaematophorus
- Species: O. giganteus

Binomial name
- Oidaematophorus giganteus Mann, 1855

Synonyms
- Pterophorus giganteus Mann, 1855

Species of plume moth

Oidaematophorus giganteus is a moth in the family Pterophoridae. It is found on Sicily, Corsica and Sardinia and in Portugal, France and Italy.

== Description ==
The species have a wingspan of 28–31 millimetres (1.1–1.2 in), and are brownish-yellow coloured. The lobes are dorsally curved and acute. The male genitalia valve is elongated from the left, but is still straight and half as long as the right valve. Meantime, the right valve is of the same shape, but lacks a saccular spine, which the left one has. The female genitalia have flattened Ostium, while the antrum is narrowed, identically to Oidaematophorus constanti.

== Habitat ==
The larvae feed on Inula hellenium and Mediterranean fleabane (Pulicaria odora).
