= Oidaematophorus mauritius =

Scientific classification
- Kingdom: Animalia
- Phylum: Arthropoda
- Clade: Pancrustacea
- Class: Insecta
- Order: Lepidoptera
- Family: Pterophoridae
- Genus: Oidaematophorus
- Species: O. mauritius

Binomial name
- Oidaematophorus mauritius Gibeaux, 1994

Species of plume moth

Oidaematophorus mauritius is a moth of the family Pterophoridae. It is known from Mauritius.
