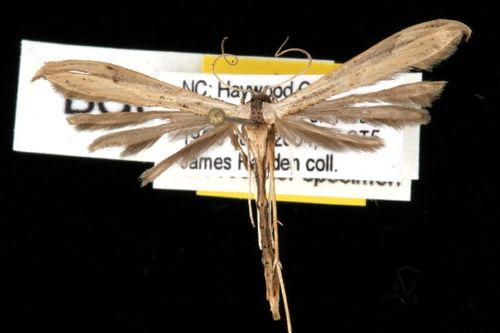

Scientific classification
- Kingdom: Animalia
- Phylum: Arthropoda
- Clade: Pancrustacea
- Class: Insecta
- Order: Lepidoptera
- Family: Pterophoridae
- Genus: Oidaematophorus
- Species: O. lindseyi

Binomial name
- Oidaematophorus lindseyi McDunnough, 1923

= Oidaematophorus lindseyi =

Species of plume moth

Oidaematophorus lindseyi is a moth of the family Pterophoridae that is found in North America, including Alberta.
