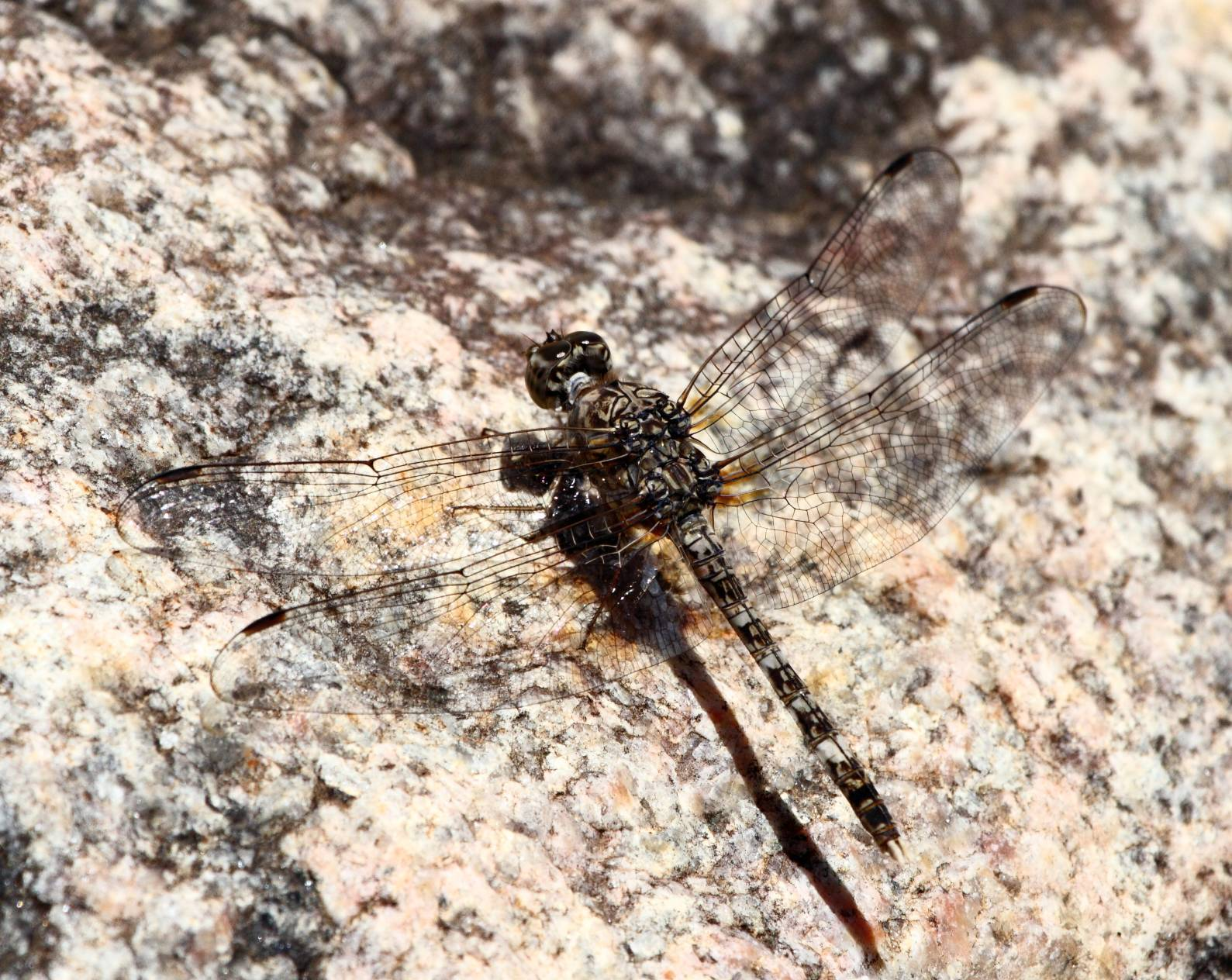
- Male

Conservation status
- Least Concern (IUCN 3.1)

Scientific classification
- Kingdom: Animalia
- Phylum: Arthropoda
- Class: Insecta
- Order: Odonata
- Infraorder: Anisoptera
- Family: Libellulidae
- Genus: Bradinopyga
- Species: B. cornuta

Binomial name
- Bradinopyga cornuta Ris, 1911

= Bradinopyga cornuta =

Species of dragonfly

Bradinopyga cornuta is a species of dragonfly in the family Libellulidae known by the common names horned rock-dweller and flecked wall-skimmer. It is native to much of southeastern Africa, where it is widespread. It lives in open habitat around rock pools. It is threatened by water pollution, but it is not considered to be endangered.
