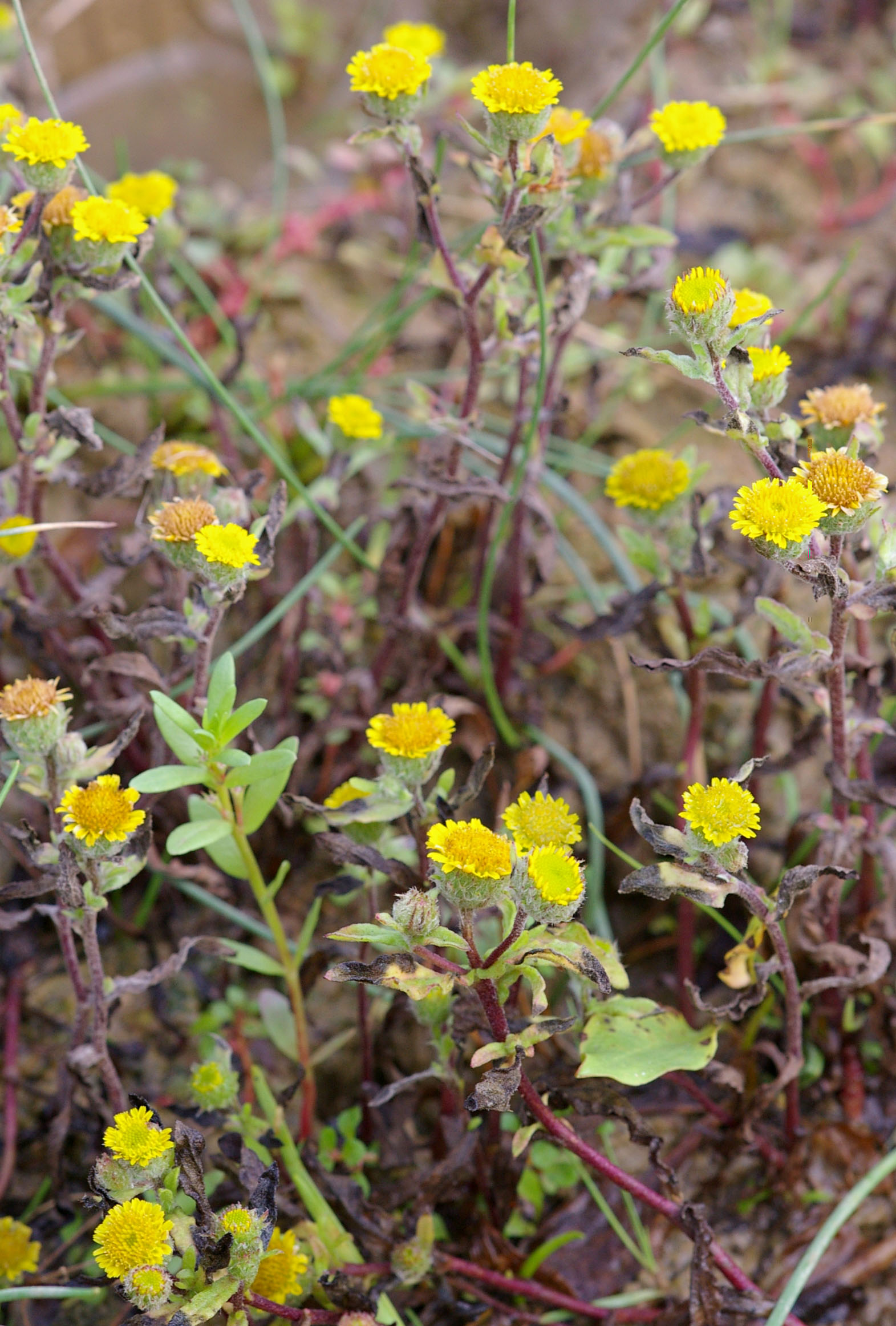

Scientific classification
- Kingdom: Plantae
- Clade: Tracheophytes
- Clade: Angiosperms
- Clade: Eudicots
- Clade: Asterids
- Order: Asterales
- Family: Asteraceae
- Genus: Pulicaria
- Species: P. vulgaris

Binomial name
- Pulicaria vulgaris Gaertn.

= Pulicaria vulgaris =

Species of flowering plant

Pulicaria vulgaris is a species of flowering plant belonging to the family Asteraceae.

Its native range is Europe to Western Siberia, the Himalaya, and Northern Africa. The plant is an annual and grows in temperate cilmates.
