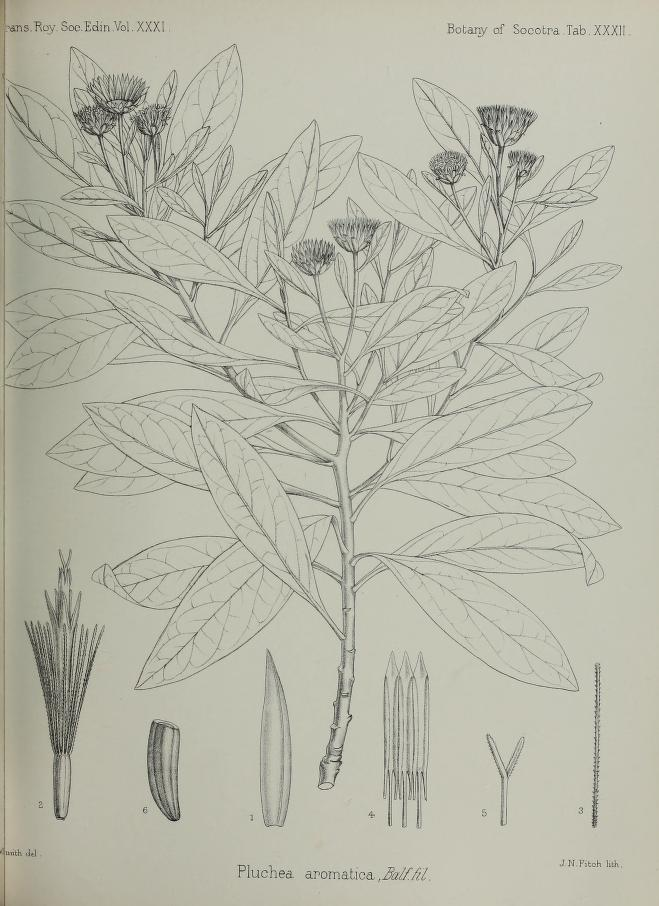

Conservation status
- Endangered (IUCN 3.1)

Scientific classification
- Kingdom: Plantae
- Clade: Tracheophytes
- Clade: Angiosperms
- Clade: Eudicots
- Clade: Asterids
- Order: Asterales
- Family: Asteraceae
- Genus: Pulicaria
- Species: P. aromatica

Binomial name
- Pulicaria aromatica (Balf.f.) S.King-Jones & N.Kilian

Synonyms
- Pluchea aromatica Balf.f.

= Pulicaria aromatica =

Species of plant

Pulicaria aromatica is a species of flowering plant in the family Asteraceae. It is found only on the island of Socotra in Yemen. Its natural habitats are subtropical or tropical dry forests and rocky areas.
