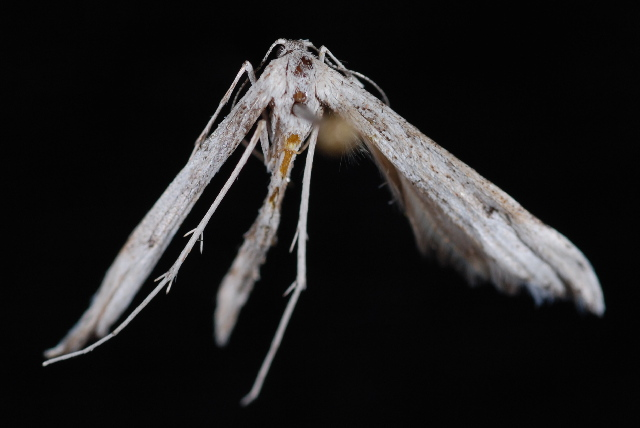

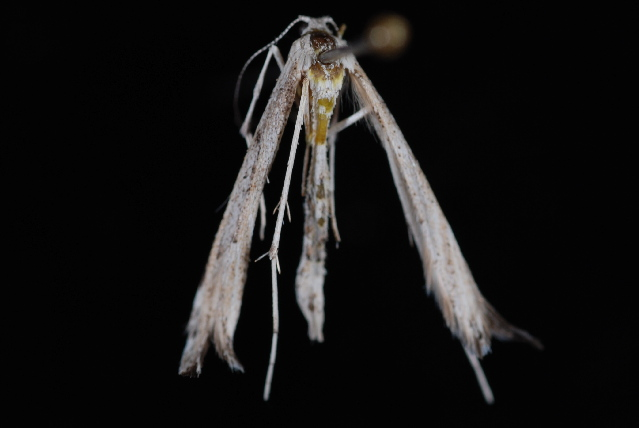

Scientific classification
- Kingdom: Animalia
- Phylum: Arthropoda
- Clade: Pancrustacea
- Class: Insecta
- Order: Lepidoptera
- Family: Pterophoridae
- Genus: Oidaematophorus
- Species: O. mathewianus

Binomial name
- Oidaematophorus mathewianus (Zeller, 1874)

Synonyms
- Leioptilus mathewianus Zeller, 1874; Pterophorus gorgoniensis Grinnell, 1908; Pterophorus hilda Grinnell, 1908; Pterophorus mathewianus – Fernard, 1898

= Oidaematophorus mathewianus =

Species of plume moth

Oidaematophorus mathewianus, the yarrow leaf plume moth or Mathew's plume moth, is a moth of the family Pterophoridae. It is found in southern Canada and the western part of the United States, eastward in the north to Maine. It is not uncommon in eastern Canada. The larvae feed on Achillea millefolium.

== Description ==
The wingspan is 21–26 millimetres (0.83–1.02 in). The head is brownish grey and the antennae are dust grey, faintly annulated on the basal third with whitish. The thorax and abdomen are whitish grey. The forewings are very pale brownish grey, with a brownish spot before the fissure. The hindwings are the same colour as the forewings.

Young larvae are dingy white, with a tinge of green. Later instars are pale glaucous to dull salmon. The pupa varies in colour and marking: in the spring brood, it is commonly dull green, with indistinct lateral yellow stripes; in the fall brood, the dorsum is pale yellow or flesh color, with two fine, indistinct, medio-dorsal lines of lilac color. The pupa is quite active and irritable, striking about in all directions when meddled with.
