= Pulicaria dioscorides =

Conservation status
- Endangered (IUCN 3.1)

Scientific classification
- Kingdom: Plantae
- Clade: Tracheophytes
- Clade: Angiosperms
- Clade: Eudicots
- Clade: Asterids
- Order: Asterales
- Family: Asteraceae
- Genus: Pulicaria
- Species: P. dioscorides

Binomial name
- Pulicaria dioscorides R.Atk.

Species of plant

Pulicaria dioscorides is a species of flowering plant in the family Asteraceae. It is found only on the island of Socotra in Yemen. Its natural habitat is rocky areas.
