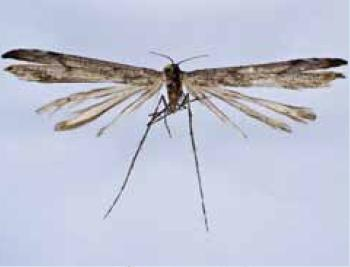

Scientific classification
- Kingdom: Animalia
- Phylum: Arthropoda
- Clade: Pancrustacea
- Class: Insecta
- Order: Lepidoptera
- Family: Pterophoridae
- Genus: Oidaematophorus
- Species: O. nigrofuscus

Binomial name
- Oidaematophorus nigrofuscus Gibeaux, 1986

Synonyms
- Oidaematophus nigrofuscus

= Oidaematophorus nigrofuscus =

Species of plume moth

Oidaematophorus nigrofuscus is a moth of the family Pterophoridae that is endemic to Venezuela. The type location is Páramo de Piedras blancas.

The wingspan is 39 millimetres (1.5 in). Adults are on wing in September.
