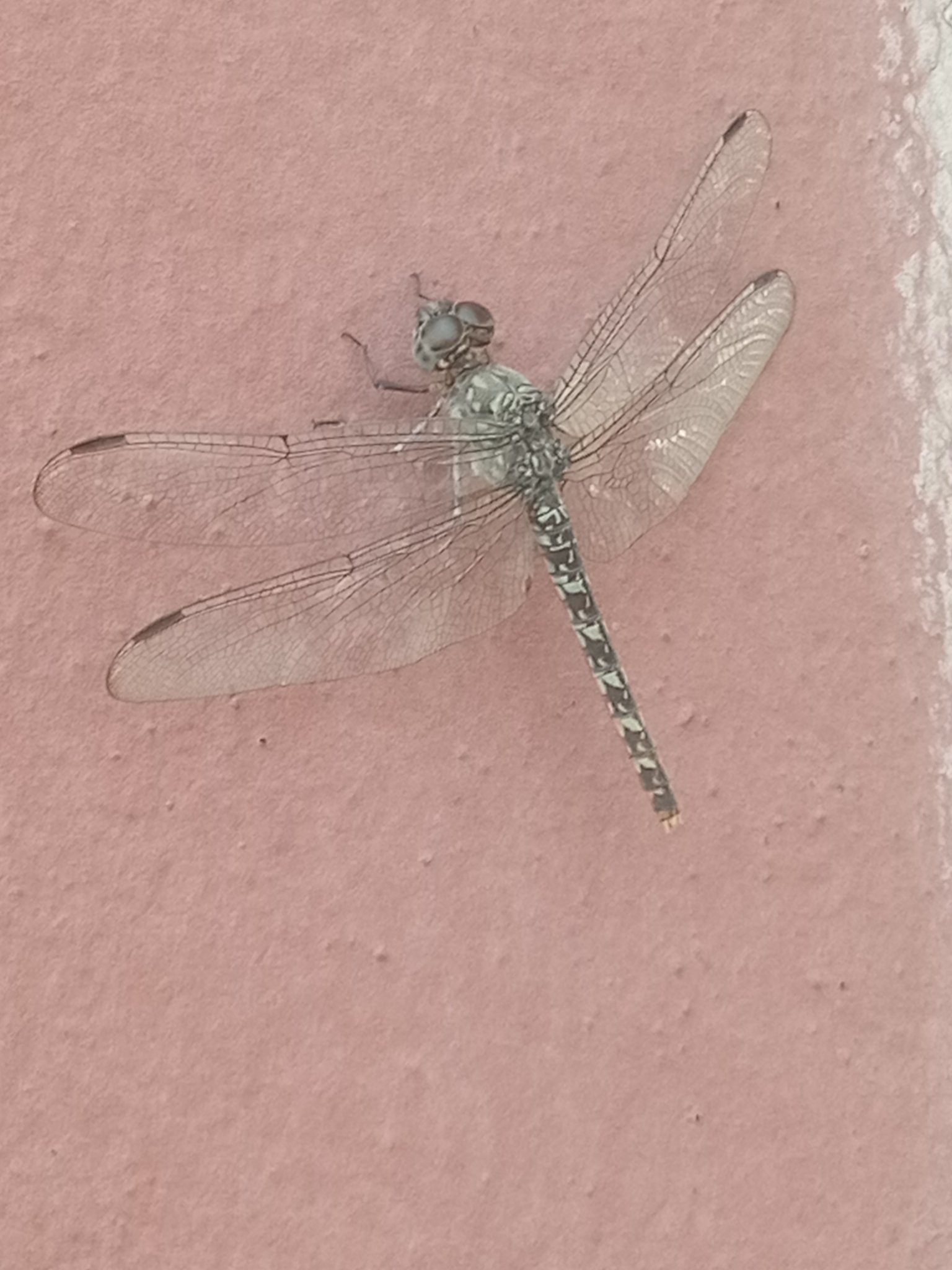

Conservation status
- Least Concern (IUCN 3.1)

Scientific classification
- Kingdom: Animalia
- Phylum: Arthropoda
- Class: Insecta
- Order: Odonata
- Infraorder: Anisoptera
- Family: Libellulidae
- Genus: Bradinopyga
- Species: B. strachani

Binomial name
- Bradinopyga strachani (Kirby, 1900)

Synonyms
- Apeleutherus strachani Kirby, 1900

= Bradinopyga strachani =

Species of dragonfly

Bradinopyga strachani, the red rockdweller or red rock-dweller, is a species of dragonfly in the family Libellulidae. It is native to much of West, Central, and East Africa. It can be found around rock pools. It has been observed resting on the steep sides of termite mounds.
