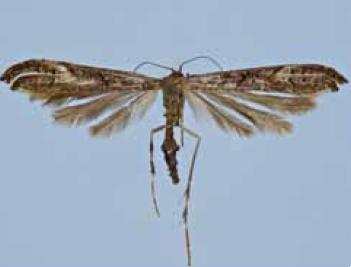

Scientific classification
- Kingdom: Animalia
- Phylum: Arthropoda
- Clade: Pancrustacea
- Class: Insecta
- Order: Lepidoptera
- Family: Pterophoridae
- Genus: Oidaematophorus
- Species: O. trachyphloeus

Binomial name
- Oidaematophorus trachyphloeus (Meyrick, 1926)

Synonyms
- Pterophorus trachyphloeus Meyrick, 1926; Hellinsia trachyphloeus

= Oidaematophorus trachyphloeus =

Species of plume moth

Oidaematophorus trachyphloeus is a moth of the family Pterophoridae that is found in Costa Rica, Guatemala and Panama.

The wingspan is 23–24 millimetres (0.91–0.94 in). Adults are on wing in May and September.
