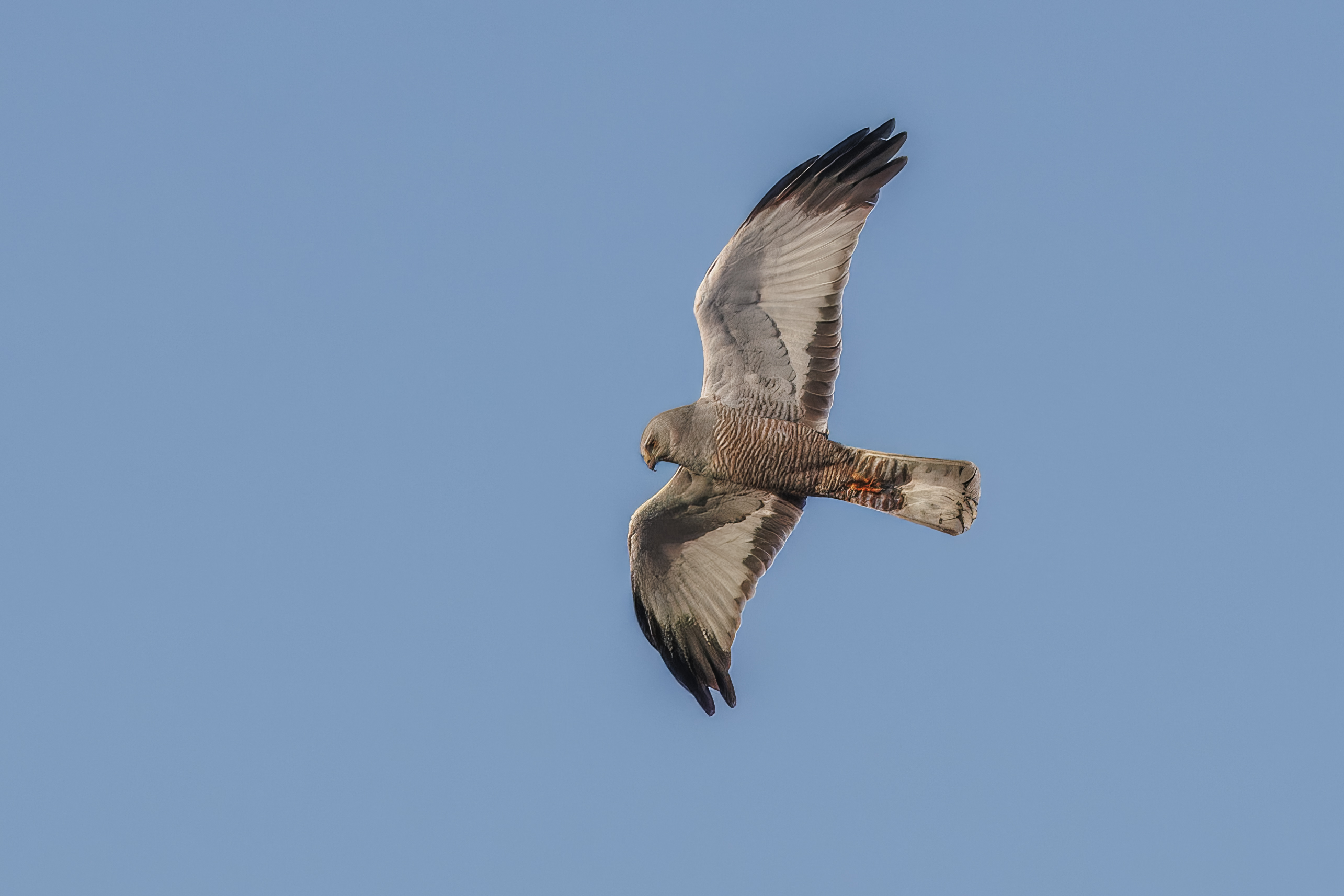
- male, Torres del Paine, Chile

Conservation status
- Least Concern (IUCN 3.1)

Scientific classification
- Kingdom: Animalia
- Phylum: Chordata
- Class: Aves
- Order: Accipitriformes
- Family: Accipitridae
- Genus: Circus
- Species: C. cinereus

Binomial name
- Circus cinereus Vieillot, 1816

= Cinereous harrier =

Species of bird

The cinereous harrier (Circus cinereus) is a South American bird of prey of the harrier family. Its breeding range extends from the Tierra del Fuego through Argentina and Chile to Bolivia, Paraguay, Peru and southern Brazil; and across the Andes north to Colombia. The bird's population is declining but due to its large range is not considered vulnerable. The term cinereous, deriving from the Latin word for ashy, describes its colouration.

== Description ==
The male's plumage is dark grey above with black wingtips and a white rump. The underparts are pale grey, with a rufous streaked belly. The female's plumage is brown above, with a white rump, and cream coloured underneath, with a streaked belly similar to the males. The female is larger than the male with an average size of 46 cm (18 in) compared to the male's 40 cm (16 in). The wingspan is 90–115 cm (35–45 in). Since the 44.5 cm (17.5 in) tail comprises about 56% of this raptor's total length, this species ties with the long-tailed hawk as the raptor with the longest tail relative to its body size.

== Habitat and ecology ==
This bird can be found in different open habitats, ranging from lowland marshes to the Andean Altiplano at a maximum altitude of 4000 meters (13123 ft). Like other harriers it nests on the ground. It is usually considered to be sedentary, and may migrate during April and May and returning to breeding grounds between September and October.

== Reproduction ==
During the breeding season, males and females engage in large aerial courtship displays and chatter very loudly. Eggs are laid in November and fledged by January. Nests are located in vegetation and up to 40 centimetres (16 in) across and 30 centimetres (12 in) deep.

== Diet ==
Its diet is variable, due to a wide range and variety of habitats. Its usual prey are small rodents and birds, notably chicks of coots and waders, reptiles, amphibians and insects.
