= Oidaematophorus cretidactylus =

Scientific classification
- Kingdom: Animalia
- Phylum: Arthropoda
- Clade: Pancrustacea
- Class: Insecta
- Order: Lepidoptera
- Family: Pterophoridae
- Genus: Oidaematophorus
- Species: O. cretidactylus

Binomial name
- Oidaematophorus cretidactylus (Fitch, 1855)

Synonyms
- Pterophorus cretidactylus Fitch, 1855; Oedaematophorus gypsodactylus Walsingham, 1880

Species of plume moth

Oidaematophorus cretidactylus is a moth of the family Pterophoridae that is found in North America (including California, New York and Ontario).

The wingspan is about 26 millimetres (1.0 in). The head is whitish ochreous, slightly tinged with fawn colour on the front. The palpi are fawn colour and the antennae are whitish, faintly spotted with fawn color. The thorax is whitish ochreous and the abdomen is fawn colour. The forewings are whitish ochreous, the costa, apex and hind margin tinged with fawn colour. There is a dark fawn-coloured spot before the base of the fissure, more or less connected obliquely with an elongated spot of the same colour on the costa. There is a light space on each side of the costal spot. The fringes are whitish ochreous, tinged with pale fawn colour. The hindwings and fringes are lustrous, pale fawn colour.
