= Pulicaria lanata =

Conservation status
- Least Concern (IUCN 3.1)

Scientific classification
- Kingdom: Plantae
- Clade: Tracheophytes
- Clade: Angiosperms
- Clade: Eudicots
- Clade: Asterids
- Order: Asterales
- Family: Asteraceae
- Genus: Pulicaria
- Species: P. lanata

Binomial name
- Pulicaria lanata E.Gamal-Eldin

Species of plant

Pulicaria lanata is a species of flowering plant in the family Asteraceae. It is found only on the island of Socotra in Yemen. Its natural habitat is subtropical or tropical dry shrubland.
