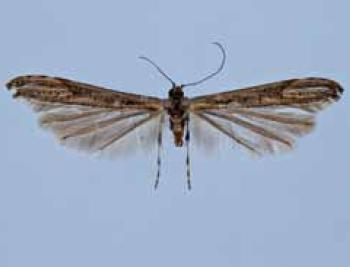

Scientific classification
- Kingdom: Animalia
- Phylum: Arthropoda
- Clade: Pancrustacea
- Class: Insecta
- Order: Lepidoptera
- Family: Pterophoridae
- Genus: Oidaematophorus
- Species: O. pseudotrachyphloeus

Binomial name
- Oidaematophorus pseudotrachyphloeus Gielis, 2011

= Oidaematophorus pseudotrachyphloeus =

Species of plume moth

Oidaematophorus pseudotrachyphloeus is a moth of the family Pterophoridae. It is found in Argentina, Ecuador and Peru.

The wingspan is 22 mm.
