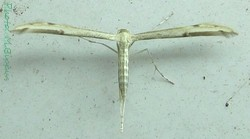

Scientific classification
- Kingdom: Animalia
- Phylum: Arthropoda
- Clade: Pancrustacea
- Class: Insecta
- Order: Lepidoptera
- Family: Pterophoridae
- Genus: Oidaematophorus
- Species: O. borbonicus

Binomial name
- Oidaematophorus borbonicus Gibeaux, 1991

= Oidaematophorus borbonicus =

Species of plume moth

Oidaematophorus borbonicus is a moth of the family Pterophoridae that is known from La Réunion.
