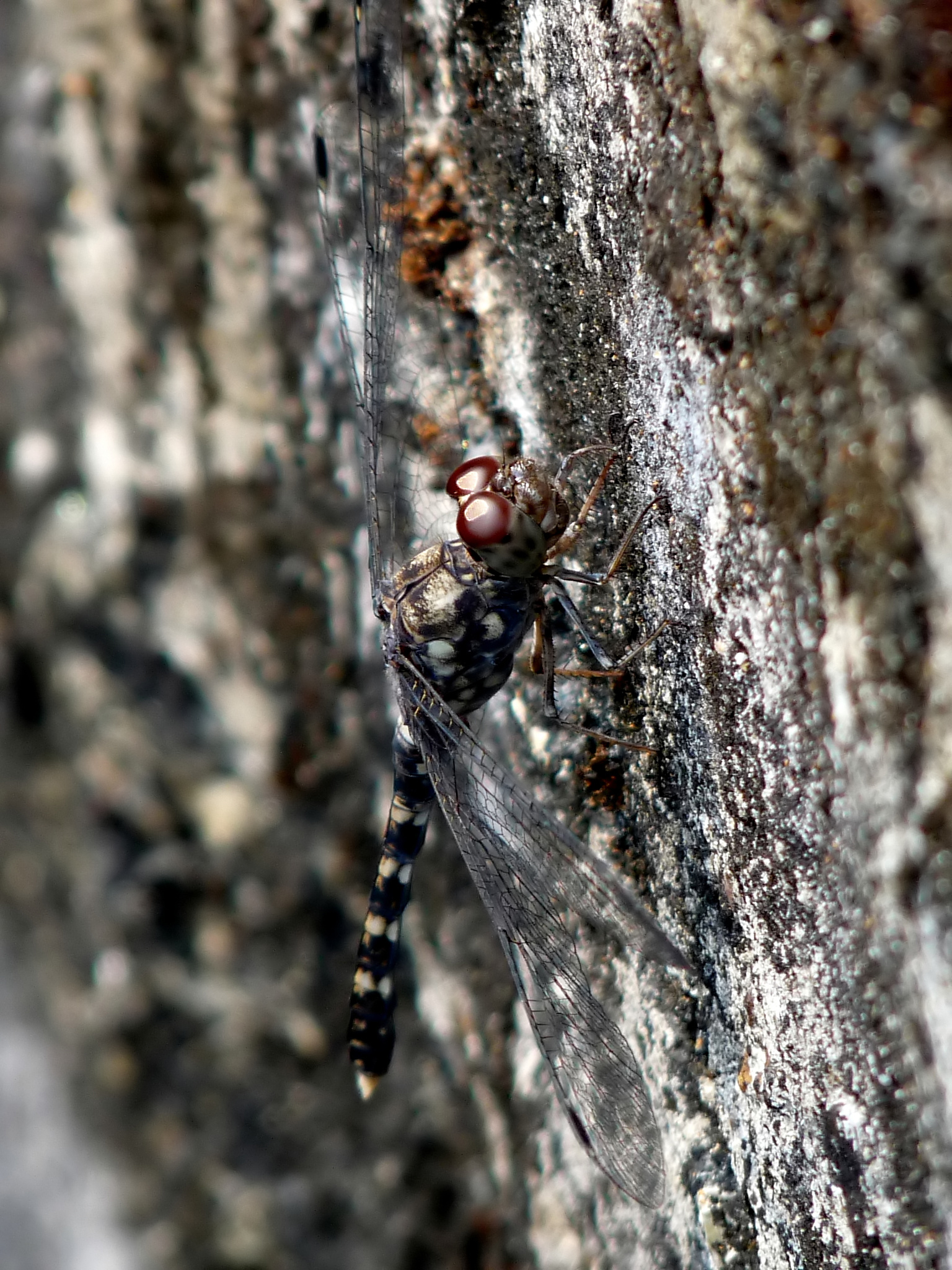
- B. geminata

Scientific classification
- Kingdom: Animalia
- Phylum: Arthropoda
- Class: Insecta
- Order: Odonata
- Infraorder: Anisoptera
- Family: Libellulidae
- Subfamily: Sympetrinae
- Genus: Bradinopyga; Kirby, 1893

= Bradinopyga =

Genus of dragonflies

Bradinopyga is a genus of dragonflies in the family Libellulidae. It contains the following species:

- Bradinopyga cornuta Ris, 1911 – horned rock-dweller
- Bradinopyga geminata (Rambur, 1842) – granite ghost
- Bradinopyga konkanensis Joshi & Sawant, 2020 – Konkan rockdweller
- Bradinopyga strachani (Kirby, 1900) – red rock-dweller

The name is derived from Aeolic Greek bradinos (=rhadinos) meaning slender or pliable and Greek pyge for rump or buttock.
