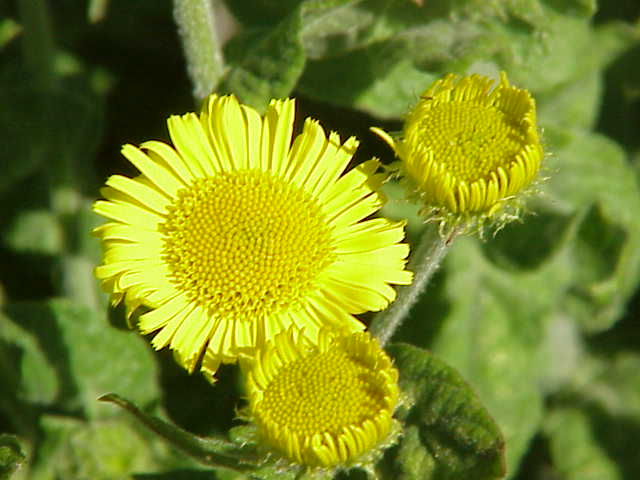
- Pulicaria dysenterica

Scientific classification
- Kingdom: Plantae
- Clade: Tracheophytes
- Clade: Angiosperms
- Clade: Eudicots
- Clade: Asterids
- Order: Asterales
- Family: Asteraceae
- Subfamily: Asteroideae
- Tribe: Inuleae
- Genus: Pulicaria; Gaertn.

Type species
- Pulicaria vulgaris Gaertn.

Synonyms
- Tubilium Cass.; Duchesnia Cass.; Sclerostephane Chiov.

= Pulicaria =

Genus of plants

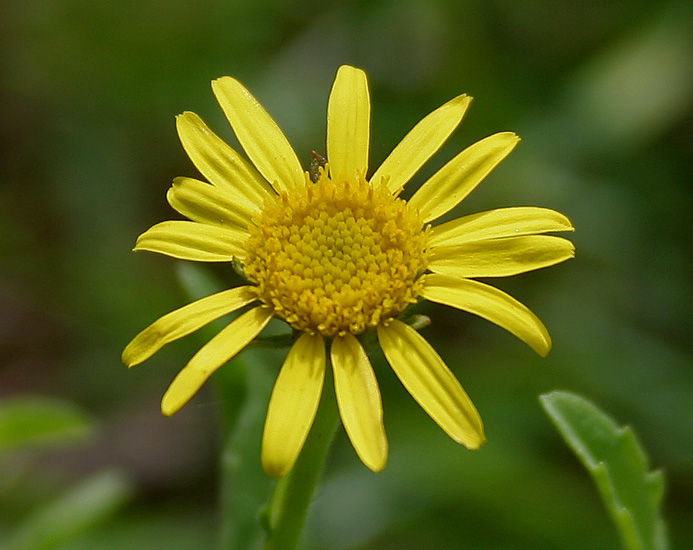
Pulicaria wightiana in Hyderabad, India.

Pulicaria is a genus of flowering plant in the sunflower family, native to Europe, Asia, and Africa. In North America Pulicaria is known by the common name false fleabane.

Pulicaria species accepted by the Plants of the World Online as of June 2022:

- Pulicaria adenophora Franch.
- Pulicaria albida E.Gamal-Eldin
- Pulicaria alveolosa Batt. & Trab.
- Pulicaria angustifolia DC.
- Pulicaria arabica (L.) Cass.
- Pulicaria argyrophylla Franch.
- Pulicaria armena Boiss. & Kotschy
- Pulicaria aromatica (Balf.f.) S.King-Jones & N.Kilian
- Pulicaria attentuata Hutch. & B.L.Burtt
- Pulicaria aualites Chiov.
- Pulicaria aucheri Jaub. & Spach
- Pulicaria auranitica Mouterde
- Pulicaria aylmeri Baker
- Pulicaria baluchistanica Qaiser & Abid
- Pulicaria boissieri Hook.f.
- Pulicaria burchardii Hutch.
- Pulicaria canariensis Bolle
- Pulicaria carnosa (Boiss.) Burkill
- Pulicaria chrysantha (Diels) Y.Ling
- Pulicaria clausonis Pomel
- Pulicaria collenettei (Wagenitz & E.Gamal-Eldin) N.Kilian
- Pulicaria confusa E.Gamal-Eldin
- Pulicaria diffusa (Shuttlew.) Pett.
- Pulicaria dioscorides R.Atk.
- Pulicaria discoidea (Chiov.) N.Kilian
- Pulicaria diversifolia Balf.f.
- Pulicaria dumulosa E.Gamal-Eldin
- Pulicaria dysenterica (L.) Bernh.
- Pulicaria edmondsonii E.Gamal-Eldin
- Pulicaria elegans E.Gamal-Eldin
- Pulicaria filaginoides Pomel
- Pulicaria foliolosa DC.
- Pulicaria gabrielii N.Kilian
- Pulicaria gamal-eldiniae N.Kilian & P.Hein
- Pulicaria glandulosa Caball.
- Pulicaria glaucescens Jaub. & Spach
- Pulicaria glutinosa (Boiss.) Jaub. & Spach
- Pulicaria gnaphalodes (Vent.) Boiss.
- Pulicaria grandidentata Jaub. & Spach
- Pulicaria grantii Oliv. & Hiern
- Pulicaria guestii Rech.f. & Rawi
- Pulicaria hadramautica E.Gamal-Eldin & Boulos
- Pulicaria hildebrandtii Vatke
- Pulicaria incisa (Lam.) DC.
- Pulicaria insignis J.R.Drumm. ex Dunn
- Pulicaria jaubertii E.Gamal-Eldin
- Pulicaria kurtziana Vatke
- Pulicaria laciniata Thell.
- Pulicaria lanata E.Gamal-Eldin
- Pulicaria lanceifolia O.Schwartz
- Pulicaria lhotei Maire
- Pulicaria mauritanica Coss.
- Pulicaria microcephala Lange
- Pulicaria migiurtinorum Chiov.
- Pulicaria monocephala Franch.
- Pulicaria mucronifolia (Boiss.) Anderb.
- Pulicaria nivea O.Schwartz
- Pulicaria nobilis E.Gamal-Eldin
- Pulicaria odora (L.) Rchb.
- Pulicaria omanensis E.Gamal-Eldin
- Pulicaria paludosa Link
- Pulicaria petiolaris Jaub. & Spach
- Pulicaria pulvinata E.Gamal-Eldin
- Pulicaria rajputanae Blatt. & Hallb.
- Pulicaria rauhii E.Gamal-Eldin
- Pulicaria renschiana Vatke
- Pulicaria salviifolia Bunge
- Pulicaria samhanensis N.Kilian & P.Hein
- Pulicaria scabra Druce
- Pulicaria schimperi DC.
- Pulicaria sericea E.Gamal-Eldin
- Pulicaria sicula (L.) Moris
- Pulicaria somalensis O.Hoffm.
- Pulicaria steinbergii E.Gamal-Eldin
- Pulicaria stephanocarpa Balf.f.
- Pulicaria undulata (L.) C.A.Mey.
- Pulicaria uniseriata N.Kilian
- Pulicaria velutina (Boiss. & Hausskn.) Anderb.
- Pulicaria vieraeoides Balf.f.
- Pulicaria volkonskyana Maire
- Pulicaria vulgaris Gaertn.
- Pulicaria wightiana (DC.) C.B.Clarke
