= Pulicaria diversifolia =

Conservation status
- Least Concern (IUCN 3.1)

Scientific classification
- Kingdom: Plantae
- Clade: Tracheophytes
- Clade: Angiosperms
- Clade: Eudicots
- Clade: Asterids
- Order: Asterales
- Family: Asteraceae
- Genus: Pulicaria
- Species: P. diversifolia

Binomial name
- Pulicaria diversifolia Balf.f.

Synonyms
- Pulicaria shoabensis Vierh.

Species of plant

Pulicaria diversifolia is a species of flowering plant in the family Asteraceae.It is found only on the islands of Socotra and Samhah in Yemen. Its natural habitat is rocky areas.
