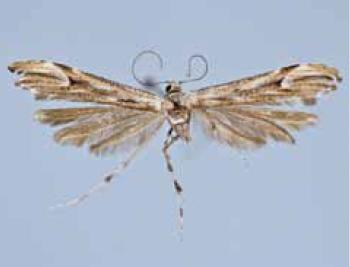

Scientific classification
- Kingdom: Animalia
- Phylum: Arthropoda
- Clade: Pancrustacea
- Class: Insecta
- Order: Lepidoptera
- Family: Pterophoridae
- Genus: Oidaematophorus
- Species: O. phaceliae

Binomial name
- Oidaematophorus phaceliae McDunnough, 1938

= Oidaematophorus phaceliae =

Species of plume moth

Oidaematophorus phaceliae is a moth of the family Pterophoridae that is found from Yukon to Ontario, south to California and Baja California. The habitat consists of boreal forest.

The wingspan is about 25 millimetres (0.98 in). The forewings are deep fawn-brown, heavily sprinkled with white and smoky scaling. The hindwings are smoky brown with pale smoky fringes. Females are somewhat more heavily marked than males.

The larvae feed on Hydrophyllaceae species, including Phacelia species and Hydrophyllum virginianum. Full-grown larvae are 11–13 millimetres (0.43–0.51 in) long and olive-green, with a clearly defined narrow longitudinal middorsal yellowish-white line, margined with grey and a light green head. Pupation occurs on the surface of dead leaves of the food plant. The pupa turns dark before eclosion.
