= Oidaematophorus castor =

Scientific classification
- Kingdom: Animalia
- Phylum: Arthropoda
- Clade: Pancrustacea
- Class: Insecta
- Order: Lepidoptera
- Family: Pterophoridae
- Genus: Oidaematophorus
- Species: O. castor

Binomial name
- Oidaematophorus castor Barnes & Lindsey, 1921

Species of plume moth

Oidaematophorus castor is a moth of the family Pterophoridae first described by William Barnes and Arthur Ward Lindsey in 1921. It is found in North America, including Arizona (the type location is the Santa Catalina Mountains), British Columbia and Alberta.
