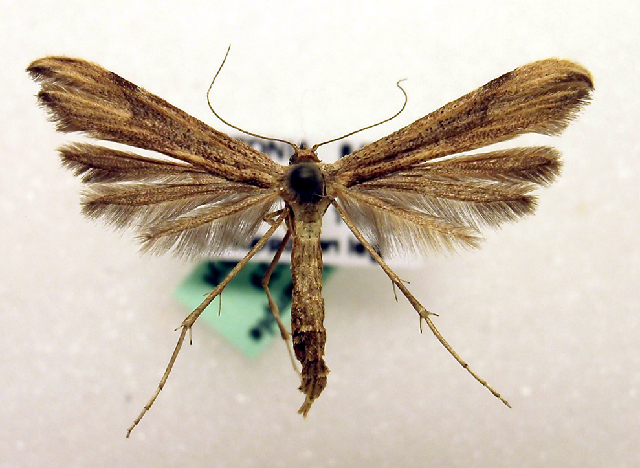

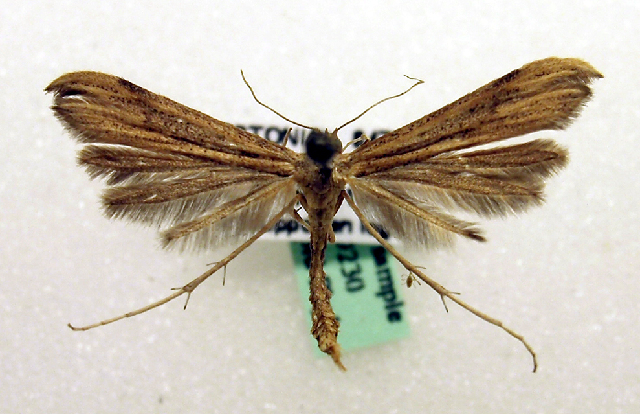

Scientific classification
- Kingdom: Animalia
- Phylum: Arthropoda
- Clade: Pancrustacea
- Class: Insecta
- Order: Lepidoptera
- Family: Pterophoridae
- Genus: Oidaematophorus
- Species: O. vafradactylus

Binomial name
- Oidaematophorus vafradactylus Svensson, 1966

= Oidaematophorus vafradactylus =

Species of plume moth

Oidaematophorus vafradactylus is a moth of the family Pterophoridae found in Estonia, Finland and Sweden.

== Description ==
The female ostium is positioned in the center of genitalia, and deeply excavated. The antrum is 1 1/2 mm in length and in width, and is narrowed. The males have a saccular spine which is curved that is located on the left side of the valve, with the right side is much simpler.

The wingspan is 23–24 millimetres (0.91–0.94 in). Adults are on wing in July and August.

The larvae possibly feed on willowleaf yellowhead (Inula salicina).
