= Oidaematophorus catalinae =

Scientific classification
- Kingdom: Animalia
- Phylum: Arthropoda
- Clade: Pancrustacea
- Class: Insecta
- Order: Lepidoptera
- Family: Pterophoridae
- Genus: Oidaematophorus
- Species: O. catalinae

Binomial name
- Oidaematophorus catalinae (Grinnell, 1908)

Synonyms
- Pterophorus catalinae Grinnel, 1908; Hellinsia catalinae

Species of plume moth

Oidaematophorus catalinae is a moth of the family Pterophoridae that is found in California.

The wingspan is 25–27 millimetres (0.98–1.06 in). Adults are very similar to Hellinsia caudelli, but are a little larger and slightly more yellow, with the brown subcostal shade running back to about the middle of the base of the wing. Just within the costal margin of this shade is a slender line of ground colour along the margin of the cell.
