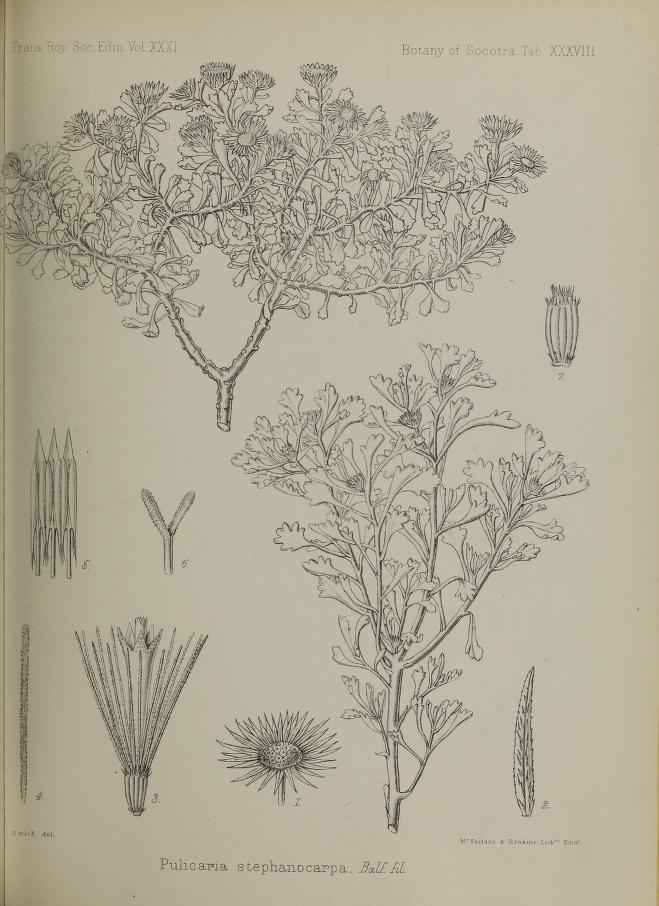

Conservation status
- Least Concern (IUCN 3.1)

Scientific classification
- Kingdom: Plantae
- Clade: Tracheophytes
- Clade: Angiosperms
- Clade: Eudicots
- Clade: Asterids
- Order: Asterales
- Family: Asteraceae
- Genus: Pulicaria
- Species: P. stephanocarpa

Binomial name
- Pulicaria stephanocarpa Balf.f

= Pulicaria stephanocarpa =

Species of plant

Pulicaria stephanocarpa is a species of flowering plant in the family Asteraceae. It is endemic to Yemen's Socotra archipelago, where it is native to the islands of Socotra, Samhah, and Abd al Kuri. Its natural habitats are subtropical or tropical dry shrubland and rocky areas.
