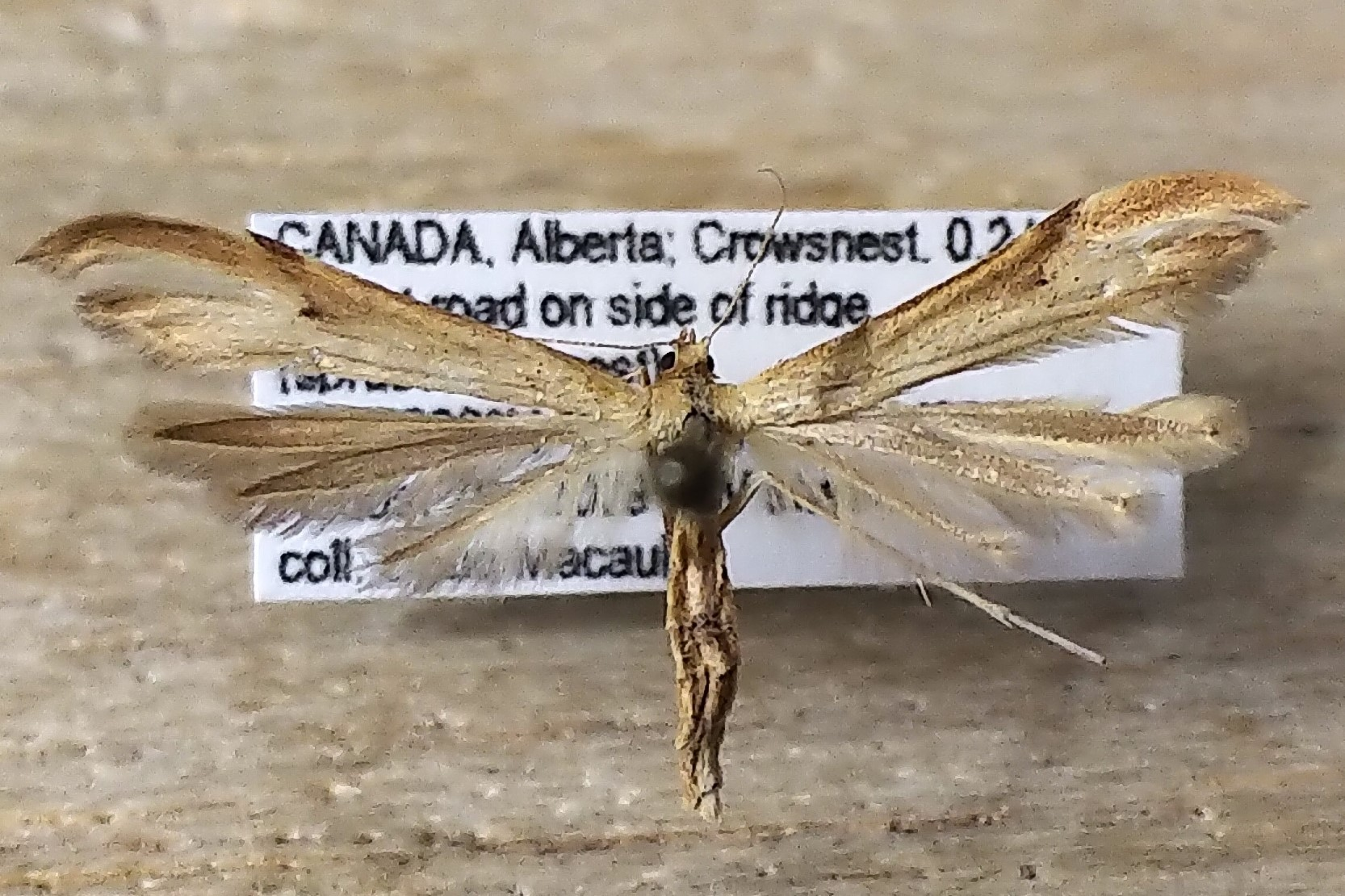

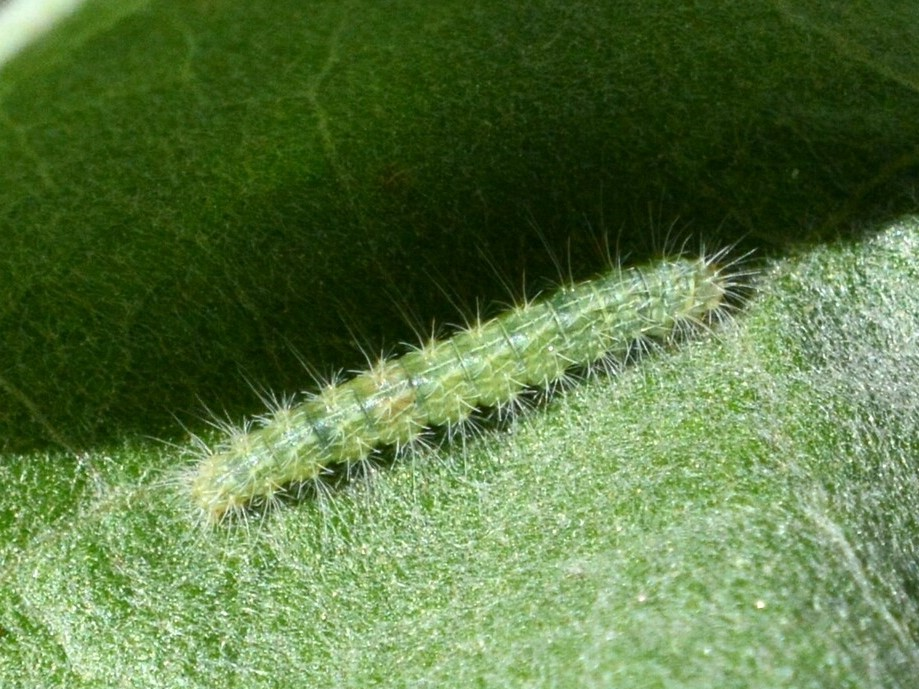
- Adult (top) and larva (bottom)

Scientific classification
- Kingdom: Animalia
- Phylum: Arthropoda
- Clade: Pancrustacea
- Class: Insecta
- Order: Lepidoptera
- Family: Pterophoridae
- Genus: Oidaematophorus
- Species: O. balsamorrhizae

Binomial name
- Oidaematophorus balsamorrhizae McDunnough, 1939

= Oidaematophorus balsamorrhizae =

Species of plume moth

Oidaematophorus balsamorrhizae is a species of moth in the family Pterophoridae first described by James Halliday McDunnough in 1939. It is found in western North America, including California, Alberta, British Columbia and Washington.

The wingspan is 23–25 millimetres (0.91–0.98 in).

The larvae feed on Balsamorhiza species.
