= Oidaematophorus downesi =

Scientific classification
- Kingdom: Animalia
- Phylum: Arthropoda
- Clade: Pancrustacea
- Class: Insecta
- Order: Lepidoptera
- Family: Pterophoridae
- Genus: Oidaematophorus
- Species: O. downesi

Binomial name
- Oidaematophorus downesi McDunnough, 1927

Species of plume moth

Oidaematophorus downesi is a moth of the family Pterophoridae that is found in North America.
