= Hellinsia chlorias =

Scientific classification
- Kingdom: Animalia
- Phylum: Arthropoda
- Class: Insecta
- Order: Lepidoptera
- Family: Pterophoridae
- Genus: Hellinsia
- Species: H. chlorias

Binomial name
- Hellinsia chlorias (Meyrick, 1908)

Synonyms
- Pterophorus chlorias Meyrick, 1908; Oidaematophorus chlorias (Meyrick, 1908)

Species of plume moth

Hellinsia chlorias, the chlorias plume moth, is a moth of the family Pterophoridae. It is found in the United States, including Mississippi, New York, Colorado and Kentucky.

The wingspan is 22–25 mm. The head is pale yellow ocherous. The antennae are pale ocherous. The thorax and abdomen are pale yellowish ocherous. The forewings are light brownish ocherous, often more or less suffused with whitish ocherous. The hindwings are gray.

== Taxonomy ==
Hellinsia chlorias is sometimes listed as a synonym of Hellinsia kellicottii.
