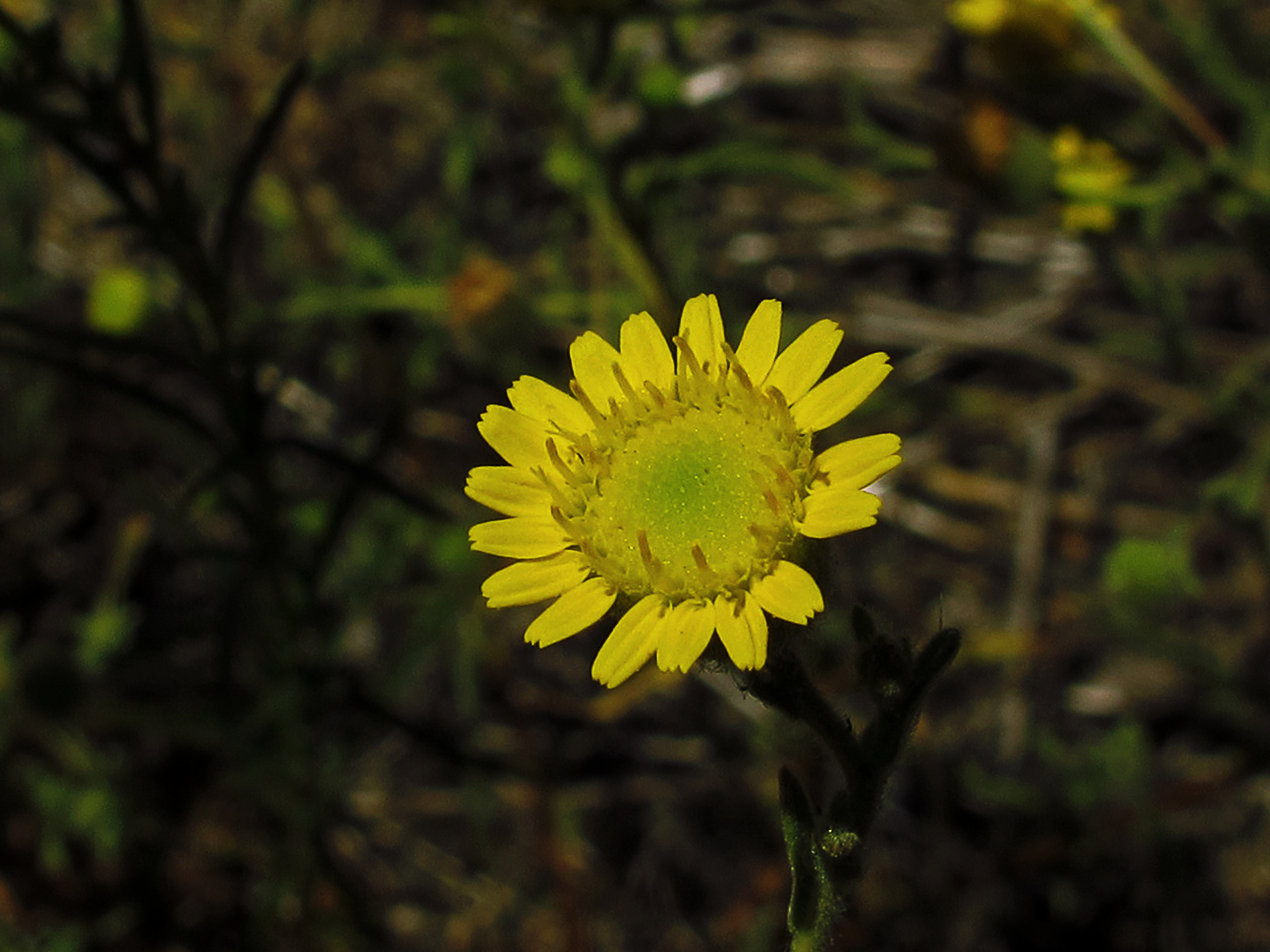

Scientific classification
- Kingdom: Plantae
- Clade: Tracheophytes
- Clade: Angiosperms
- Clade: Eudicots
- Clade: Asterids
- Order: Asterales
- Family: Asteraceae
- Genus: Pulicaria
- Species: P. paludosa

Binomial name
- Pulicaria paludosa Link

Synonyms
- Pulicaria hispanica (Boiss.) Boiss.; Pulicaria arabica subsp. hispanica (Boiss.) Murb.; Pulicaria arabica var. hispanica Boiss.; Pulicaria uliginosa Hoffmanns. & Link [non Pulicaria uliginosa Gray 1821]; "Pulicaria vulgaris" sensu Hansen & Sunding

= Pulicaria paludosa =

Species of plant

Pulicaria paludosa is a species of flowering plant in the aster family known by the common name Spanish false fleabane. It is native to Europe, particularly Spain and Portugal, and it is known as an introduced species in California, Arizona, and Clark County, Nevada, where it grows as a weed on roadsides, wetlands, riparian corridors, and other damp, disturbed areas. It is an annual, biennial, or perennial herb growing a few centimeters tall to well over a meter tall from a rhizomatous root system. The leaves are alternately arranged with blades in a variety of shapes from linear to oblong or oval. The herbage is coated in soft hairs. The inflorescence bears many flower heads. Each head has narrow, pointed, hairy phyllaries, a large dense center of many yellow disc florets, and a short fringe of many rectangular yellow ray florets, which are only about 2 millimeters long each. The fruit is an achene tipped with a pappus of bristles.
