= Pulicaria elegans =

Conservation status
- Least Concern (IUCN 3.1)

Scientific classification
- Kingdom: Plantae
- Clade: Tracheophytes
- Clade: Angiosperms
- Clade: Eudicots
- Clade: Asterids
- Order: Asterales
- Family: Asteraceae
- Genus: Pulicaria
- Species: P. elegans

Binomial name
- Pulicaria elegans E.Gamal-Eldin

Flowering plant species

Pulicaria elegans is a species of flowering plant in the family Asteraceae. It is found only on the island of Socotra in Yemen. Its natural habitats are subtropical or tropical dry forests and subtropical or tropical dry shrubland.
