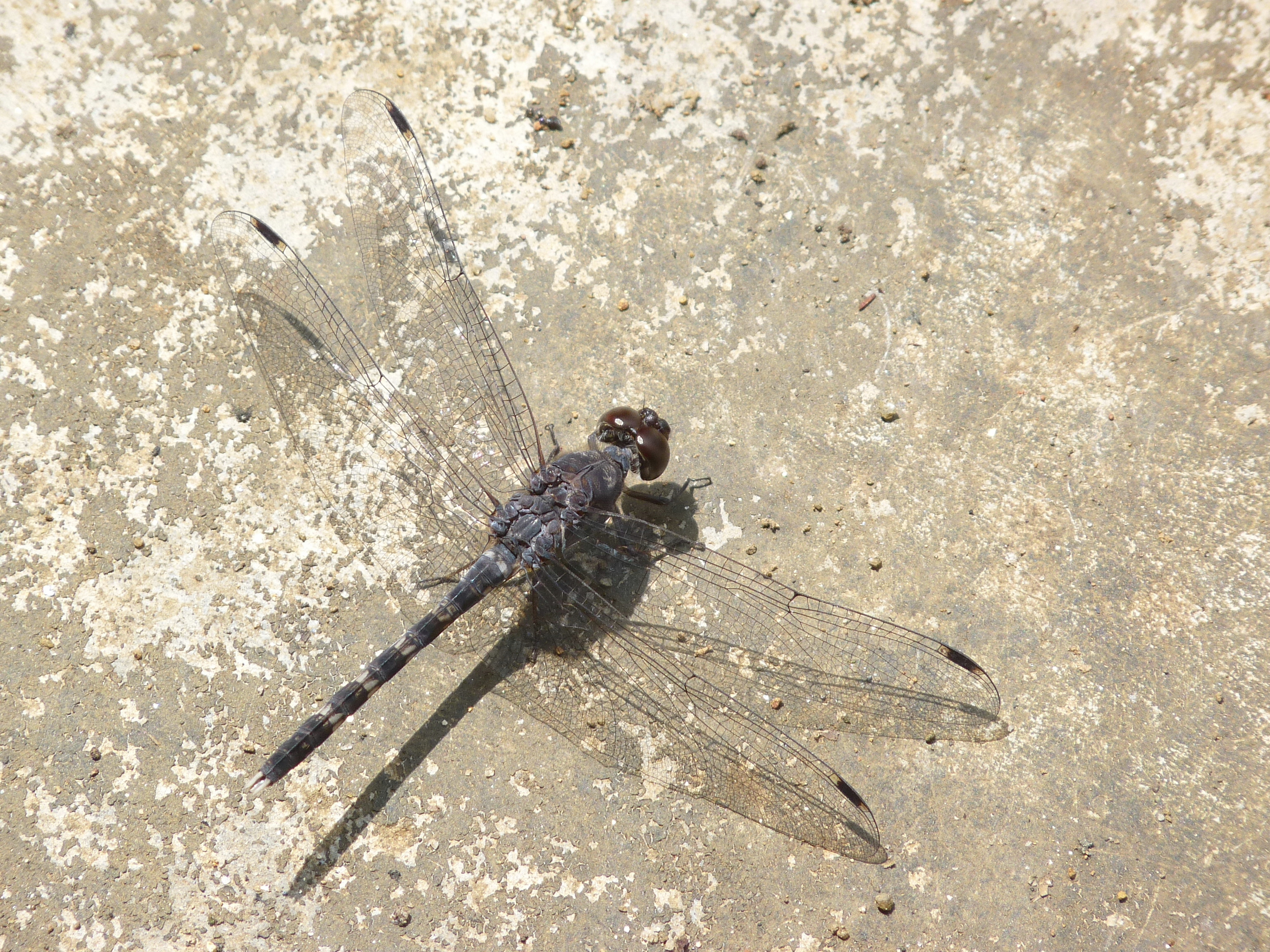
- Male
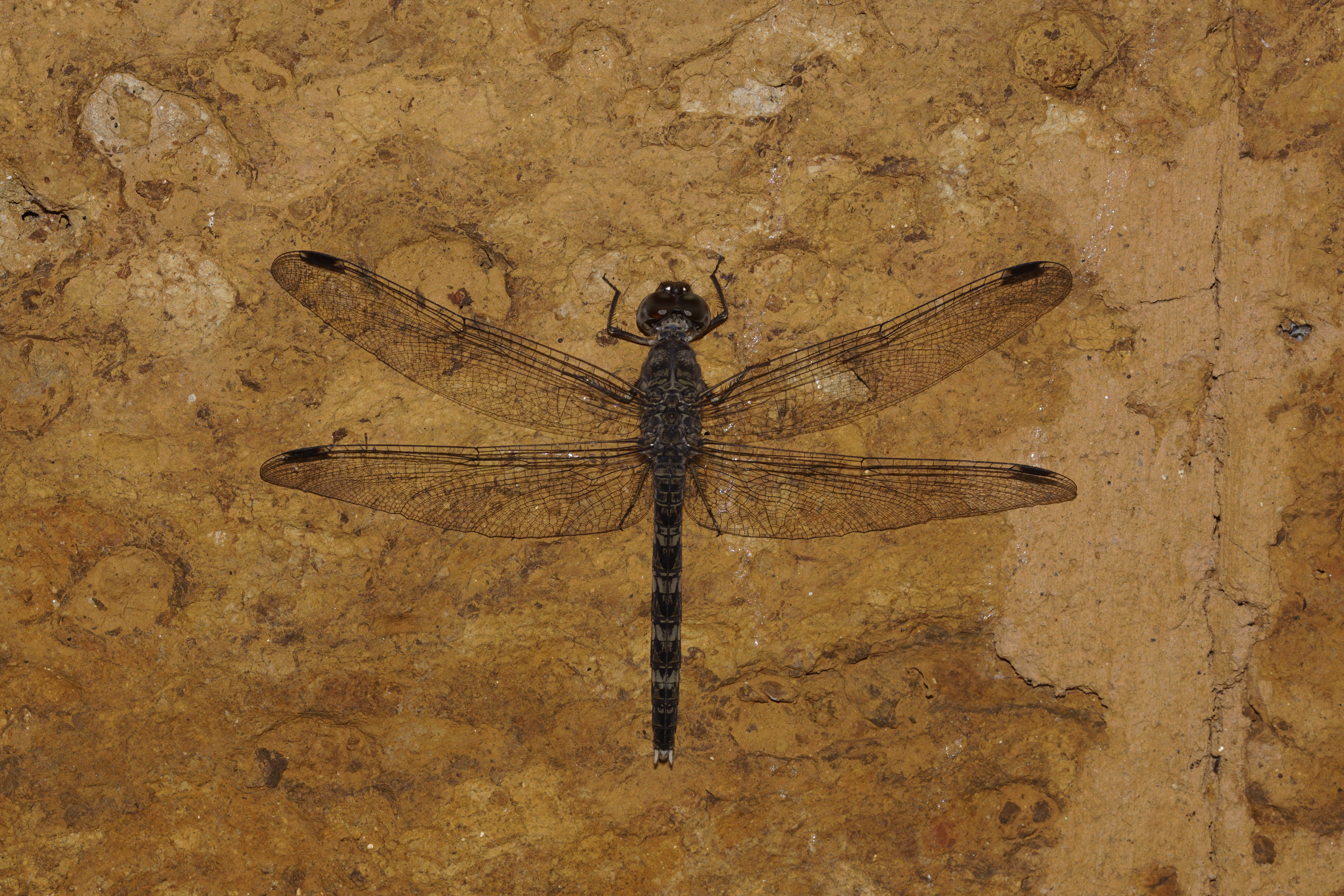
- Female

Conservation status
- Least Concern (IUCN 3.1)

Scientific classification
- Kingdom: Animalia
- Phylum: Arthropoda
- Clade: Pancrustacea
- Class: Insecta
- Order: Odonata
- Suborder: Anisoptera
- Superfamily: Libelluloidea
- Family: Libellulidae
- Genus: Bradinopyga
- Species: B. geminata

Binomial name
- Bradinopyga geminata (Rambur, 1842)

= Bradinopyga geminata =

Species of dragonfly

Bradinopyga geminata is a species of dragonfly in the family Libellulidae known commonly as the granite ghost. It is native to India, Sri Lanka and Thailand, where it is a common and widespread species.

== Description and habitat ==
It is a medium sized dragonfly with brown-capped grey eyes. Its thorax is cinereous, marbled and peppered with black in a very irregular manner. Wings are transparent with dual color pterostigma, black at centre and pure white at distal and proximal ends. Abdomen is coloured very similarly to thorax; black marbled with yellow, but with a more definite plan. Segments 3 to 8 have pale basal annules interrupted on dorsum, and formed by two elongate parallel spots. There is a triangular apical sub-dorsal spot and a pale mid-dorsal spot. Anal appendages are creamy-white. Female is similar to the male.

Taking advantage of its cryptic coloration, it often perches flat on vertical rock faces or cement-plastered walls, where it becomes quite hard to spot once at rest. It is among the most widespread dragonflies in the Indian Subcontinent and is found across many types of habitats. It's one of the few species that seem to thrive in urban environments as well, where it takes advanntage of open ditches, small cemented household water storage tanks, ponds and even small accumulations of rainwater in scrap containers to breed. Outside of urban areas, this species occupies habitats near water bodies, such as pools, irrigation channels, wells, rivers and lakes. In the wild, adults almost exclusively rest on flat surfaces like granite rocks, large boulders, and stony banks of rivers or streams where they camouflage splendidly. Unlike many other dragonfly species, they do not prefer to perch on twigs or vegetation.

The species has been studied as a predator of the disease-carrying yellow fever mosquito (Aedes aegypti). The larvae of the dragonfly consume the larvae of the mosquito in the standing-water habitat types that both occupy.

== See also ==
- List of odonates of Sri Lanka
- List of odonates of India
- List of odonata of Kerala
