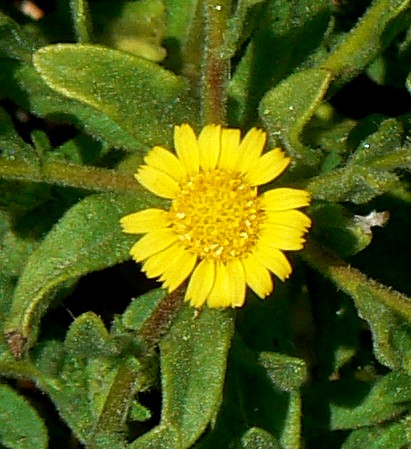

Scientific classification
- Kingdom: Plantae
- Clade: Tracheophytes
- Clade: Angiosperms
- Clade: Eudicots
- Clade: Asterids
- Order: Asterales
- Family: Asteraceae
- Genus: Pulicaria
- Species: P. microcephala

Binomial name
- Pulicaria microcephala Lange

= Pulicaria microcephala =

Species of flowering plant

Pulicaria microcephala is a species of flowering plant of the family Asteraceae endemic to the Berlengas archipelago in Portugal. It is a small and ramified plant occurring in clearings of scrubs in coastal cliffs. Its flowers are yellow, flowering between March and July. It is an endangered plant species, mainly threatened by the excessive nitrification of soils (due to the high density of seabirds) and invasive plant species, namely the ice plant.
