= Oidaematophorus negus =

Scientific classification
- Kingdom: Animalia
- Phylum: Arthropoda
- Clade: Pancrustacea
- Class: Insecta
- Order: Lepidoptera
- Family: Pterophoridae
- Genus: Oidaematophorus
- Species: O. negus

Binomial name
- Oidaematophorus negus Gibeaux, 1994

Species of plume moth

Oidaematophorus negus is a moth of the family Pterophoridae. It is known from Ethiopia.
