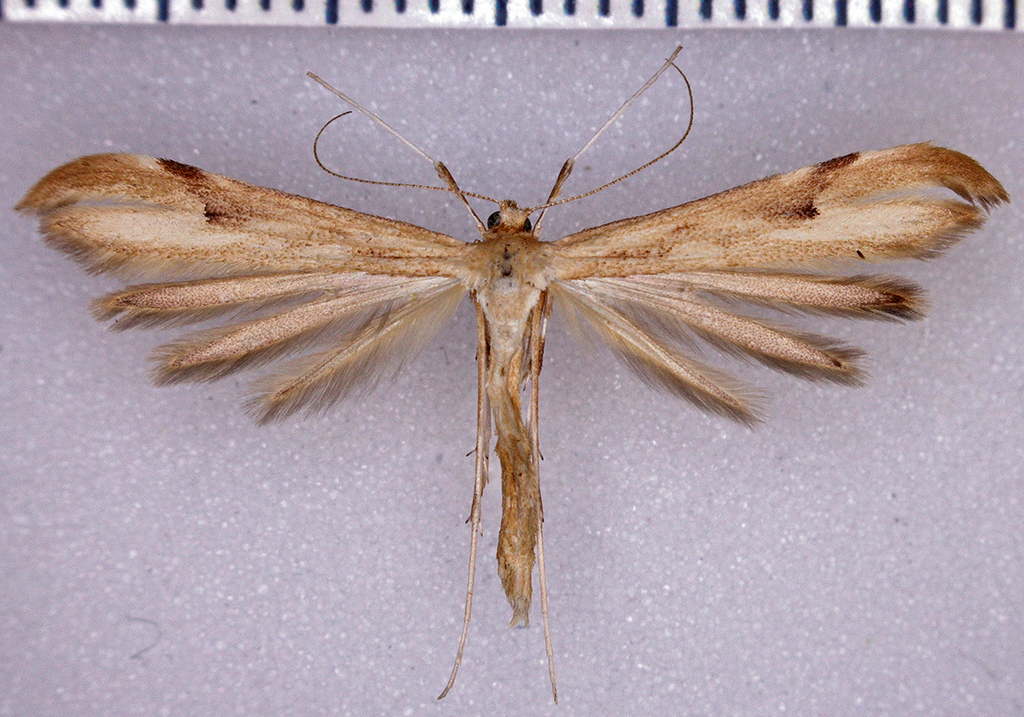

Scientific classification
- Kingdom: Animalia
- Phylum: Arthropoda
- Clade: Pancrustacea
- Class: Insecta
- Order: Lepidoptera
- Family: Pterophoridae
- Genus: Oidaematophorus
- Species: O. occidentalis

Binomial name
- Oidaematophorus occidentalis (Walsingham, 1880)

Synonyms
- Oedaematophorus occidentalis Walsingham, 1880; Stenoptilia californica Grinnell, 1908

= Oidaematophorus occidentalis =

Species of plume moth

Oidaematophorus occidentalis is a moth of the family Pterophoridae. It is found from Alberta and British Columbia to Arizona and Utah.

The wingspan is 26–29 millimetres (1.0–1.1 in). The species is extremely variable, but can be generally described as follows. The head, thorax and abdomen are creamy white to dull tawny-brown, the head with a pale patch between the antennae. The forewings are the same colour as the thorax, normally with a heavy brown costal mark over the base of the cleft, preceded and followed by a few whitish scales. This patch is connected with a small brown triangular shade before the cleft. The wing is marked with cloudy brown areas and the first lobe is light brown, but these areas are not conspicuously powdery, due to the lack of contrast between the brown scales and tawny ground colour. The fringes are tawny-grey. The hindwings are brownish and shining, with paler fringes.

The larvae feed on Aster, Grindelia and Helianthus species.
