= Oidaematophorus parshuramus =

Scientific classification
- Kingdom: Animalia
- Phylum: Arthropoda
- Clade: Pancrustacea
- Class: Insecta
- Order: Lepidoptera
- Family: Pterophoridae
- Genus: Oidaematophorus
- Species: O. parshuramus

Binomial name
- Oidaematophorus parshuramus Rose and Pooni, 2003

Species of plume moth

Oidaematophorus parshuramus is a moth of the family Pterophoridae that is endemic to India.
