= Oidaematophorus brucei =

Scientific classification
- Kingdom: Animalia
- Phylum: Arthropoda
- Clade: Pancrustacea
- Class: Insecta
- Order: Lepidoptera
- Family: Pterophoridae
- Genus: Oidaematophorus
- Species: O. brucei

Binomial name
- Oidaematophorus brucei (Fernald, 1898)

Synonyms
- Pterophorus brucei Fernald, 1898; Hellinsia brucei; Pterophorus chionastes Meyrick, 1908

Species of plume moth

Oidaematophorus brucei is a moth of the family Pterophoridae that is found in North America (including Arizona, Colorado, British Columbia, Saskatchewan and Alberta)

The wingspan is 24–26 millimetres (0.94–1.02 in). The head and thorax are pale ashy grey, with the tegulae much lighter. The forewings are white, with a few brown scales scattered over the surface, most numerous basally and along the costa. There is an elongated brown spot on the cell near the basal third of the wing and a triangular brown spot on the end of the cell immediately before the fissure, indistinctly connected with an elongate brown spot on the costa above the end of the fissure. A similar spot occurs near the middle of the costa of the first lobe. The hindwings are pale fuscous, with the fringes a little darker than the surface of the feathers.

== Etymology ==
It is named for Mr. David Bruce.
