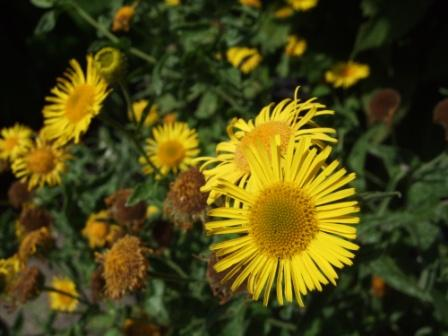

Scientific classification
- Kingdom: Plantae
- Clade: Tracheophytes
- Clade: Angiosperms
- Clade: Eudicots
- Clade: Asterids
- Order: Asterales
- Family: Asteraceae
- Genus: Pulicaria
- Species: P. dysenterica

Binomial name
- Pulicaria dysenterica (L.) Bernh.

= Pulicaria dysenterica =

Species of plant

Pulicaria dysenterica, the common fleabane, or, in North America, meadow false fleabane, is a species of fleabane in the family Asteraceae. It is native to Europe and western Asia where it grows in a variety of habitats ranging from semi-arid Mediterranean woodlands to wetter situations. Pulicaria dysenterica is perennial and can form dense clusters of plants, spreading by its roots. It flowers at its maximum height of about 60 centimetres (2.0 ft). Leaves are alternately arranged and clasp the stem, which itself contains a salty-astringent liquid. The yellow inflorescences are typically composed of a prominent centre of 40–100 disc florets surrounded by 20–30 narrow, pistillate ray florets. When setting seed the flower heads reflex.

Common fleabane is the main food plant for the fleabane tortoise beetle (Cassida murraea), and for four micromoths, Apodia bifractella, Ptocheuusa paupella, dusky plume (Oidaematophorus lithodactyla) and Digitivalva pulicariae.

Fleabane's common name comes from its former use as an incense to drive away insects. Other past uses include treatments for dysentery and unspecified ocular maladies.
