= Oidaematophorus rileyi =

Scientific classification
- Kingdom: Animalia
- Phylum: Arthropoda
- Clade: Pancrustacea
- Class: Insecta
- Order: Lepidoptera
- Family: Pterophoridae
- Genus: Oidaematophorus
- Species: O. rileyi

Binomial name
- Oidaematophorus rileyi (Fernald, 1898)

Synonyms
- Pterophorus rileyi Fernald, 1898

Species of plume moth

Oidaematophorus rileyi is a moth of the family Pterophoridae that is found in North America (including California and Alberta).

The wingspan is 29–31 millimetres (1.1–1.2 in). The head, thorax and forewings are pale brownish white or bone colour and the back of the head and collar are dull cinnamon brown. The forewings are more or less sprinkled with brown scales, especially along the costa and on the outer half of the cell. There is an oblique brown line at the end of the cell, extending upward in the direction of a brown costal streak, between which and the apex are generally two brown dots. A similar one is found on the cleft within the apex. Three brown dots occur on the outer margin of the second lobe, one on the apex, one on the middle and one on the anal angle. The hindwings are pale fuscous and darker than the forewings.

== Etymology ==
It is named for Dr. Charles Valentine Riley.
