= Hellinsia mineti =

Scientific classification
- Kingdom: Animalia
- Phylum: Arthropoda
- Clade: Pancrustacea
- Class: Insecta
- Order: Lepidoptera
- Family: Pterophoridae
- Genus: Hellinsia
- Species: H. mineti

Binomial name
- Hellinsia mineti (Gibeaux, 1994)

Synonyms
- Oidaematophorus mineti

Species of plume moth

Hellinsia mineti is a moth of the family Pterophoridae. It is known from Madagascar.

This species has a wingspan of 24 mm for the female (wing length 11 mm).
