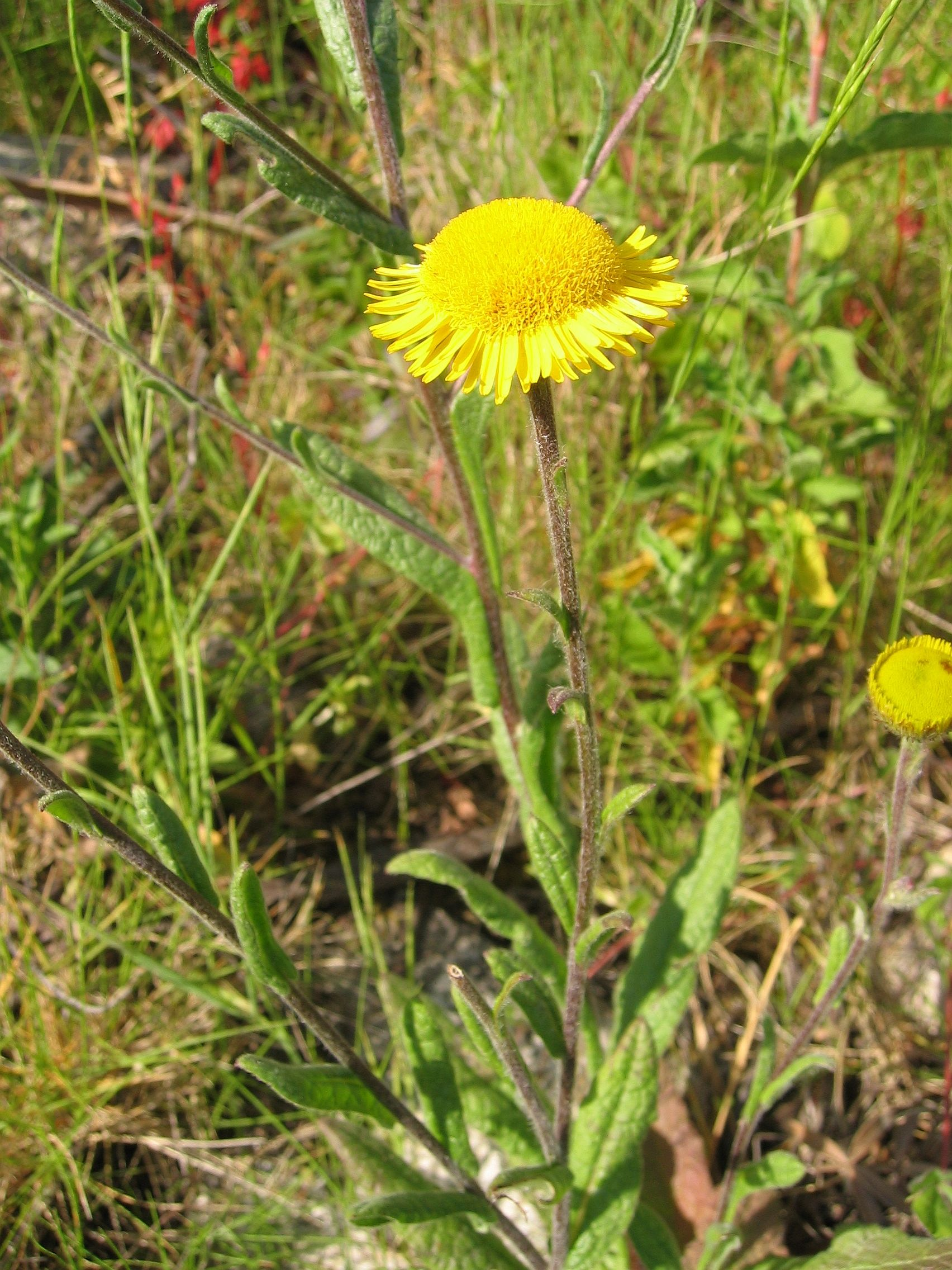

Scientific classification
- Kingdom: Plantae
- Clade: Tracheophytes
- Clade: Angiosperms
- Clade: Eudicots
- Clade: Asterids
- Order: Asterales
- Family: Asteraceae
- Genus: Pulicaria
- Species: P. odora

Binomial name
- Pulicaria odora L.

= Pulicaria odora =

Species of plant

Pulicaria odora, also known as Mediterranean fleabane, is a species of plant from family Asteraceae. The plant can be found in pine woods and bushy places, and it also grows on sandy grounds. The leaves of the plant are cooked, and could be edible after it.
