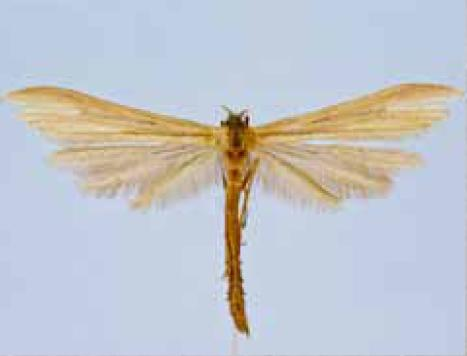

Scientific classification
- Domain: Eukaryota
- Kingdom: Animalia
- Phylum: Arthropoda
- Class: Insecta
- Order: Lepidoptera
- Family: Pterophoridae
- Genus: Hellinsia
- Species: H. grandis

Binomial name
- Hellinsia grandis (Fish, 1881)

Synonyms
- Leioptilus grandis Fish, 1881; Oidaematophorus grandis; Pterophorus grandis; Pterophorus baccharides Grinnell, 1908

= Hellinsia grandis =

Species of plume moth

Hellinsia grandis, the coyote brush borer plume moth, is a moth of the family Pterophoridae that is found in North America (including California), Mexico and Guatemala.

The wingspan is about 34 millimetres (1.3 in). The head, palpi, antennae, thorax and abdomen are of nearly a uniform pale brownish-ocherous colour. The legs are brownish ocherous. The forewings are pale brownish ocherous, in some species with a few scattered faint brownish dots on the second lobe. The fringes are slightly darker. The hindwings are very slightly browner than forewings, with the fringes still darker. Adults are on wing in August.

The larvae feed on Baccharis pilularis. They bore into the stem of their host plant.
