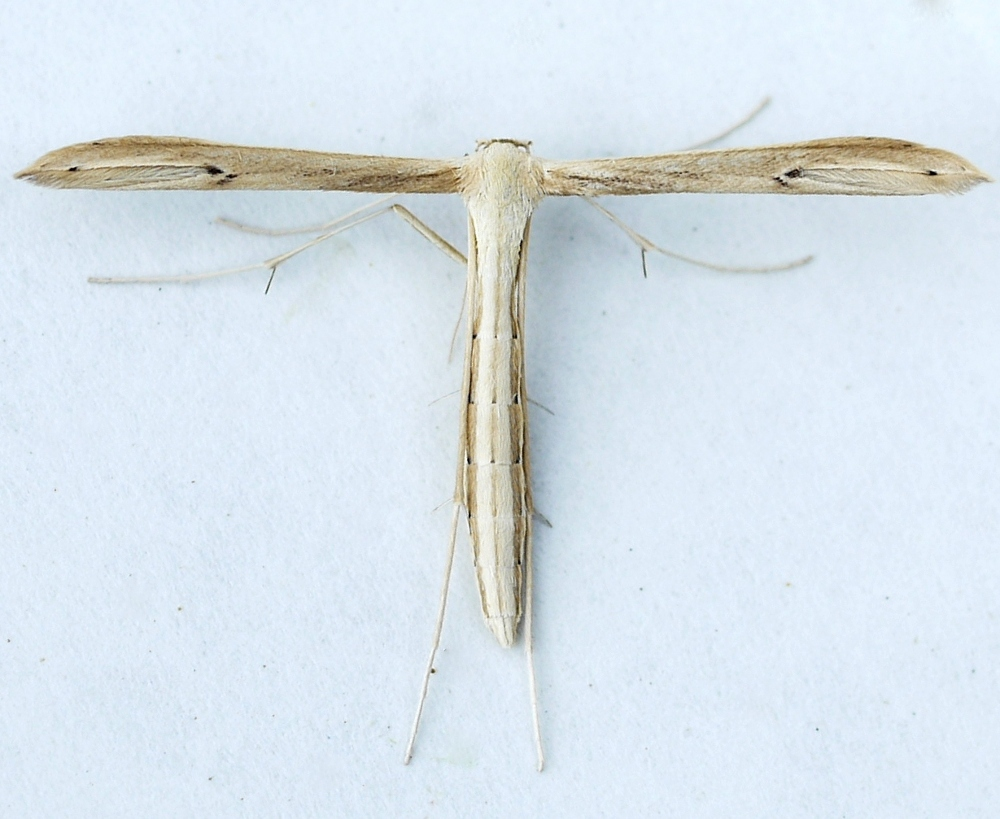

Scientific classification
- Domain: Eukaryota
- Kingdom: Animalia
- Phylum: Arthropoda
- Class: Insecta
- Order: Lepidoptera
- Family: Pterophoridae
- Genus: Hellinsia
- Species: H. kellicottii

Binomial name
- Hellinsia kellicottii (Fish, 1881)

Synonyms
- Oidaematophorus kellicottii (Fish, 1881); Oidaematophorus kellicotti (Meyrick, 1910)

= Hellinsia kellicottii =

Species of plume moth

Hellinsia kellicottii (goldenrod borer) is a moth of the family Pterophoridae. It is found in eastern North America, from Massachusetts and New York, south to southern Florida and west to Colorado and Utah. It has also been recorded from Quebec, British Columbia, Arkansas and Wisconsin.

The wingspan is 14–29 mm. Adults are on wing as early as February in Florida and as late as October in New York. There is one generation per year.

The larvae feed on Solidago species.

== Taxonomy ==
Hellinsia chlorias is sometimes listed as a synonym of Hellinsia kellicottii.
