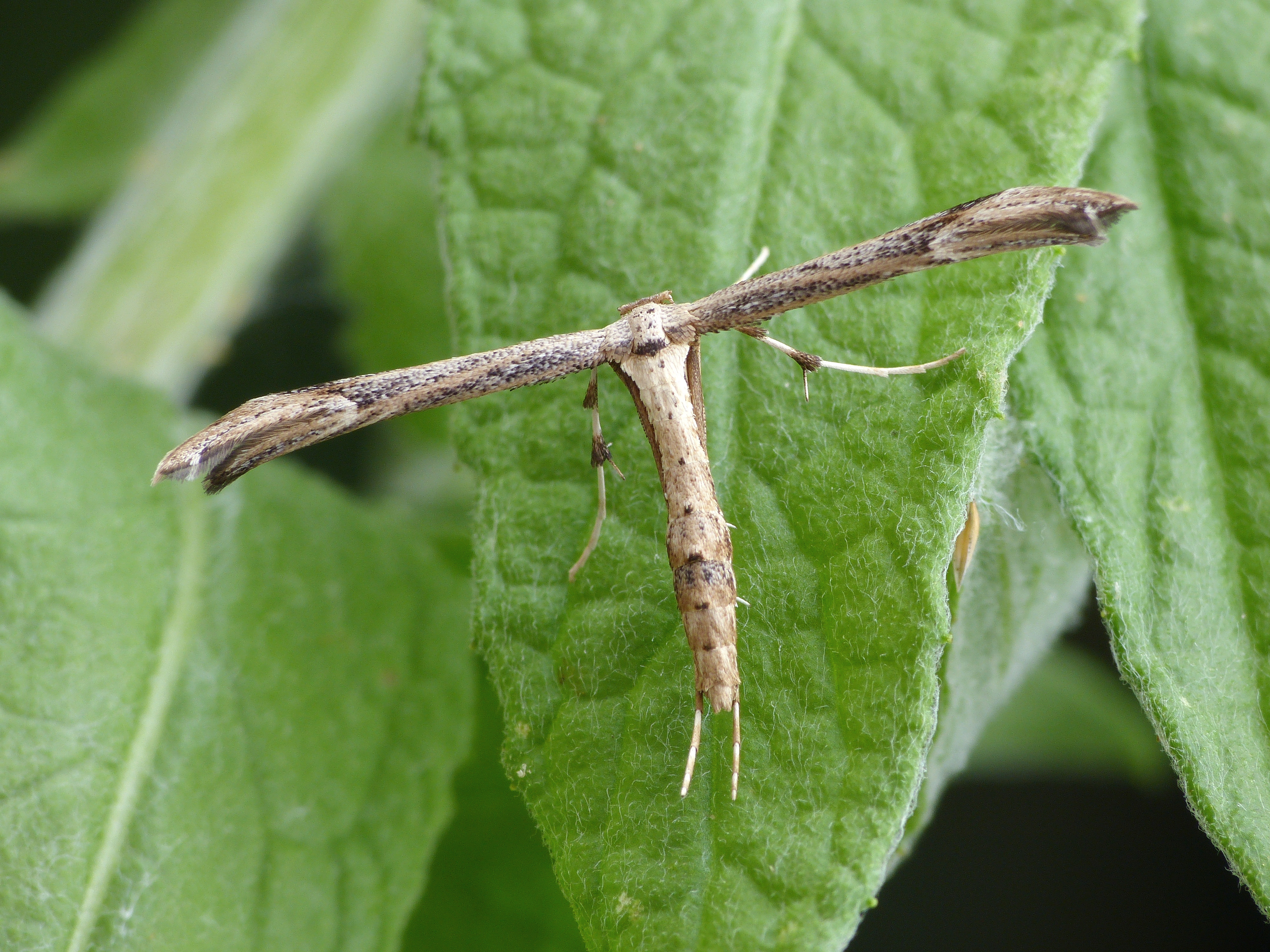

Scientific classification
- Kingdom: Animalia
- Phylum: Arthropoda
- Clade: Pancrustacea
- Class: Insecta
- Order: Lepidoptera
- Family: Pterophoridae
- Genus: Oidaematophorus
- Species: O. lithodactyla

Binomial name
- Oidaematophorus lithodactyla (Treitschke, 1833)

Synonyms
- List: Alucita lithodactyla Treitschke, 1833; Alucita septodactyla Treitschke, 1833; Pterophorus similidactylus Dale, 1834; Pterophorus phaeodactylus Stephens, 1835; Pterophorus lithoxylodactylus Duponchel, 1838; Pterophorus lithodactylus; Oidaematophorus lithodactylus

= Oidaematophorus lithodactyla =

Species of plume moth

Oidaematophorus lithodactyla, also known as the dusky plume, is a moth of the family Pterophoridae found from Europe to Asia Minor and Japan. It was first described by German lepidopterist, Georg Friedrich Treitschke in 1833.

== Description ==
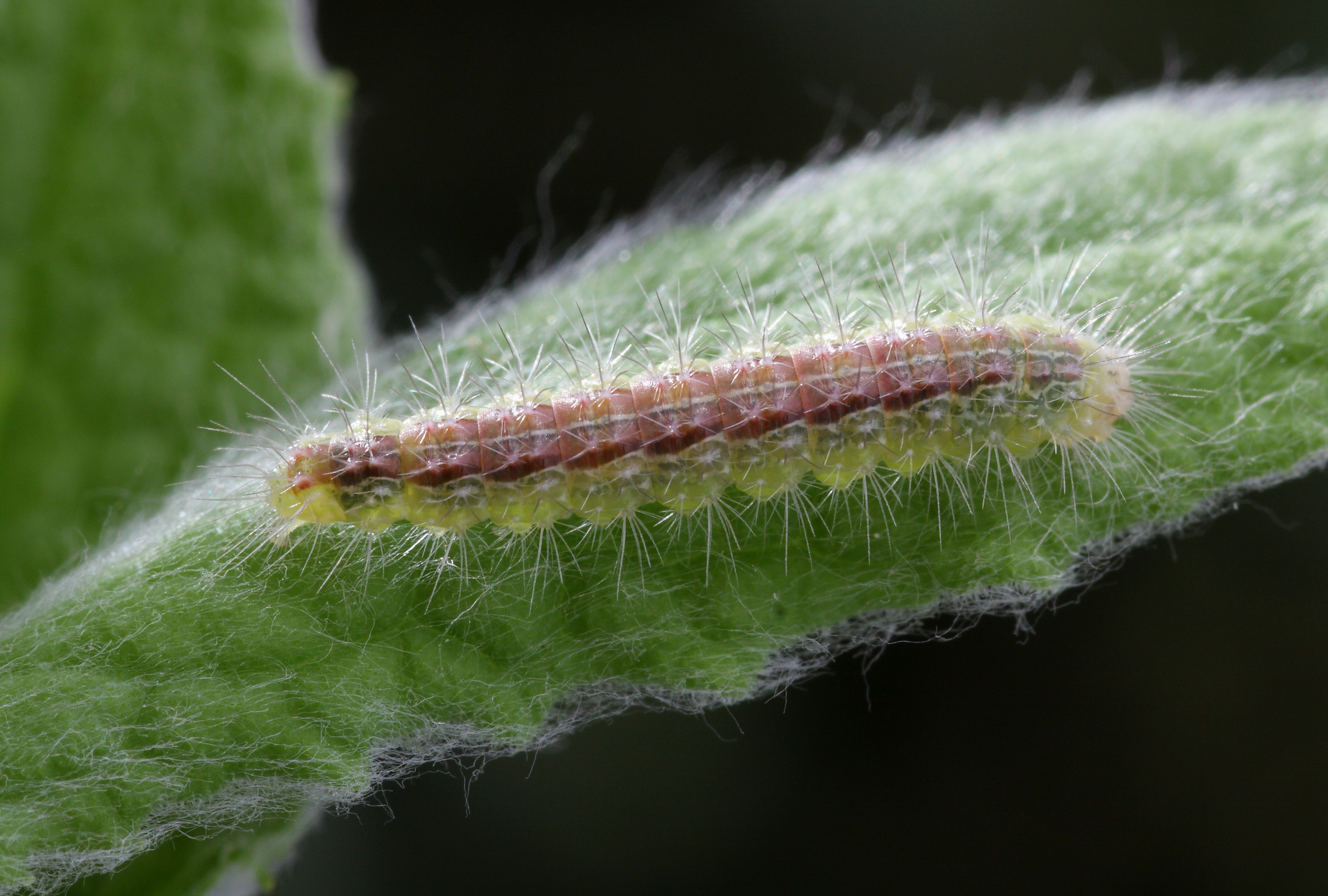

The wingspan is 26–29 millimetres (1.0–1.1 in).The middle tibiae are thickened with scales in the middle and at the apex. The forewings are pale brown, irregularly mixed with grey-whitish and irrorated with black. There is a blackish subcrescentic posteriorly white-edged mark before the fissure and an elongate blackish mark on costa near beyond it and some blackish marginal dots towards the apex. The cilia are dark grey, somewhat whitish-mixed. The hindwings are rather dark fuscous with a darker dot at apex of segments. Diagnostic – a greyish forewing with an angled darker marking just inside the cleft.

Adults are on wing in July and August in western, central and northeastern Europe.

The larvae feed on common fleabane (Pulicaria dysenterica) and ploughman's-spikenard (Inula conyza). They initially feed in the shoots, but later feed on the leaves.

On 2 June 1984, larvae were found feeding on willowleaf yellowhead (Inula salicina), in Oslo.
