= Cinereous =

Ashy grey colour

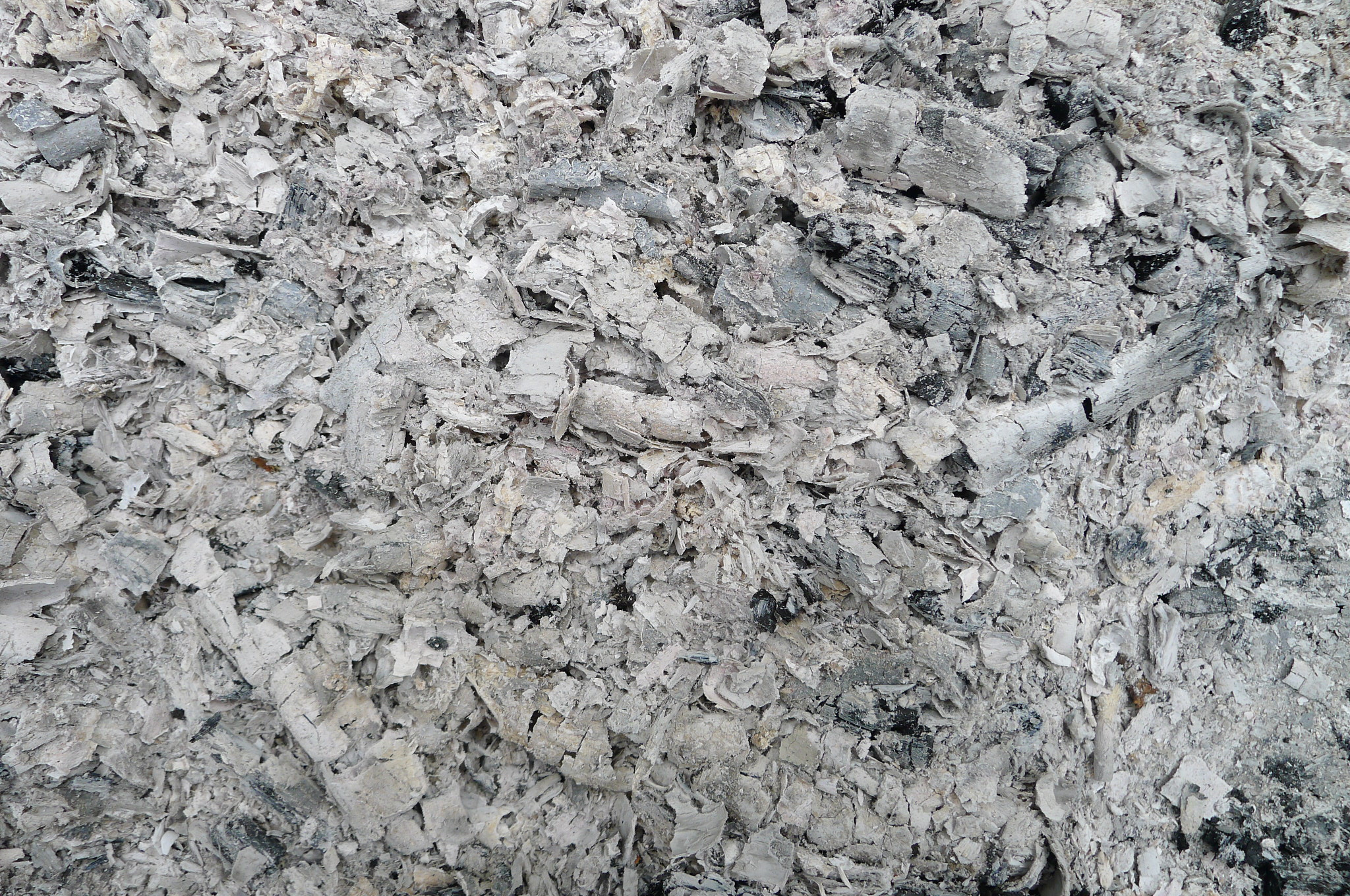
- Wood ash from a campfire

Colour coordinates
- Hex triplet: #b7b7b7
- sRGB^{B} (r, g, b): (183, 183, 183)
- HSV (h, s, v): (0°, 0%, 72%)
- CIELCh_{uv} (L, C, h): (74, 0, 0°)
- Source: Maerz and Paul
- ISCC–NBS descriptor: Light grayish brown
- B: Normalized to [0–255] (byte)

Cinereous means ashy grey in colour, either consisting of or resembling ashes, or a grey colour tinged with coppery brown. It is derived from the Latin cinereus, from cinis (wood ashes).

The first recorded use of cinereous as a colour name in English was in 1661.

== Cinereous in nature ==
Birds

- The colour name cinereous is used especially in both the English and the scientific (as cinerea / cinereus) names of birds with ash grey plumage with or without a slight coppery brown tinge, including the cinereous antshrike (Thamnomanes caesius), cinereous becard (Pachyramphus rufus), cinereous bunting (Emberiza cineracea), cinereous conebill (Conirostrum cinereum), cinereous finch (Piezorhina cinerea), cinereous ground-tyrant (Muscisaxicola cinereus), cinereous harrier (Circus cinereus), cinereous mourner (Laniocera hypopyrra), cinereous-breasted spinetail (Synallaxis hypospodia), cinereous tinamou (Crypturellus cinereus), cinereous tyrant (Knipolegus striaticeps), grey heron (Ardea cinerea), and cinereous warbling-finch (Poospiza cinerea).
- However, the colours of these birds may be brighter to the birds themselves since birds are tetrachromats and can see colours in the ultraviolet range that are invisible to humans, who are trichromats.
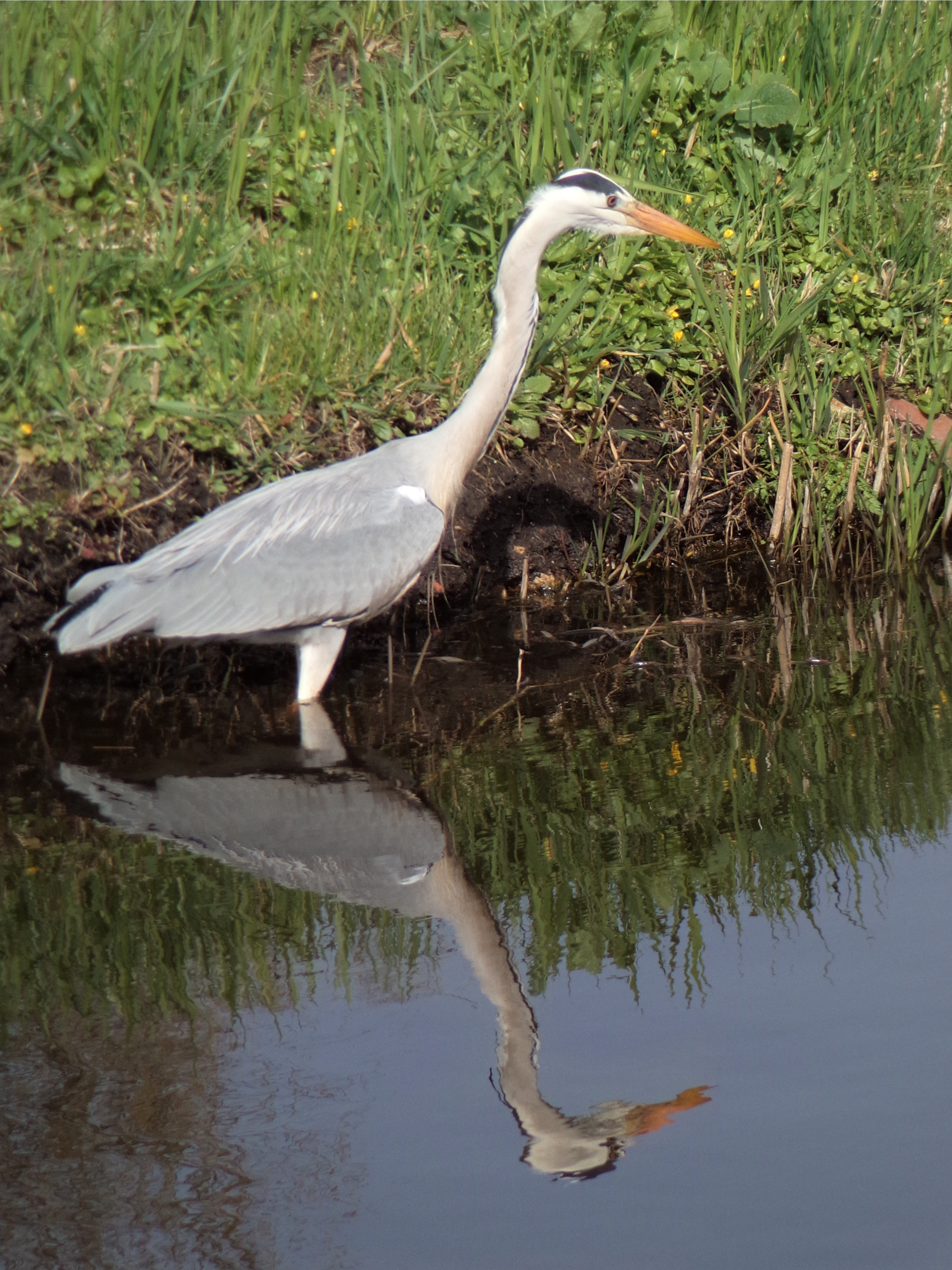
Ardea cinerea (grey heron)

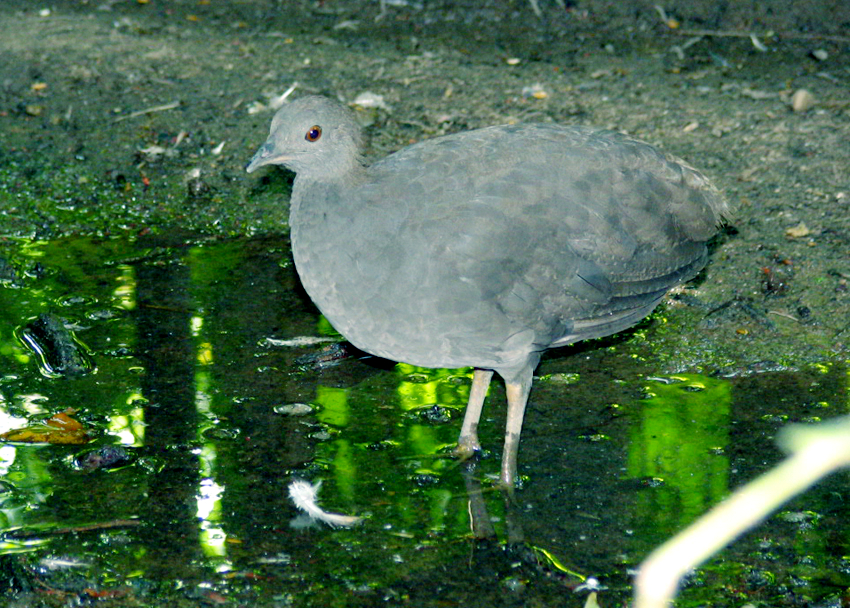
Cinereous tinamou

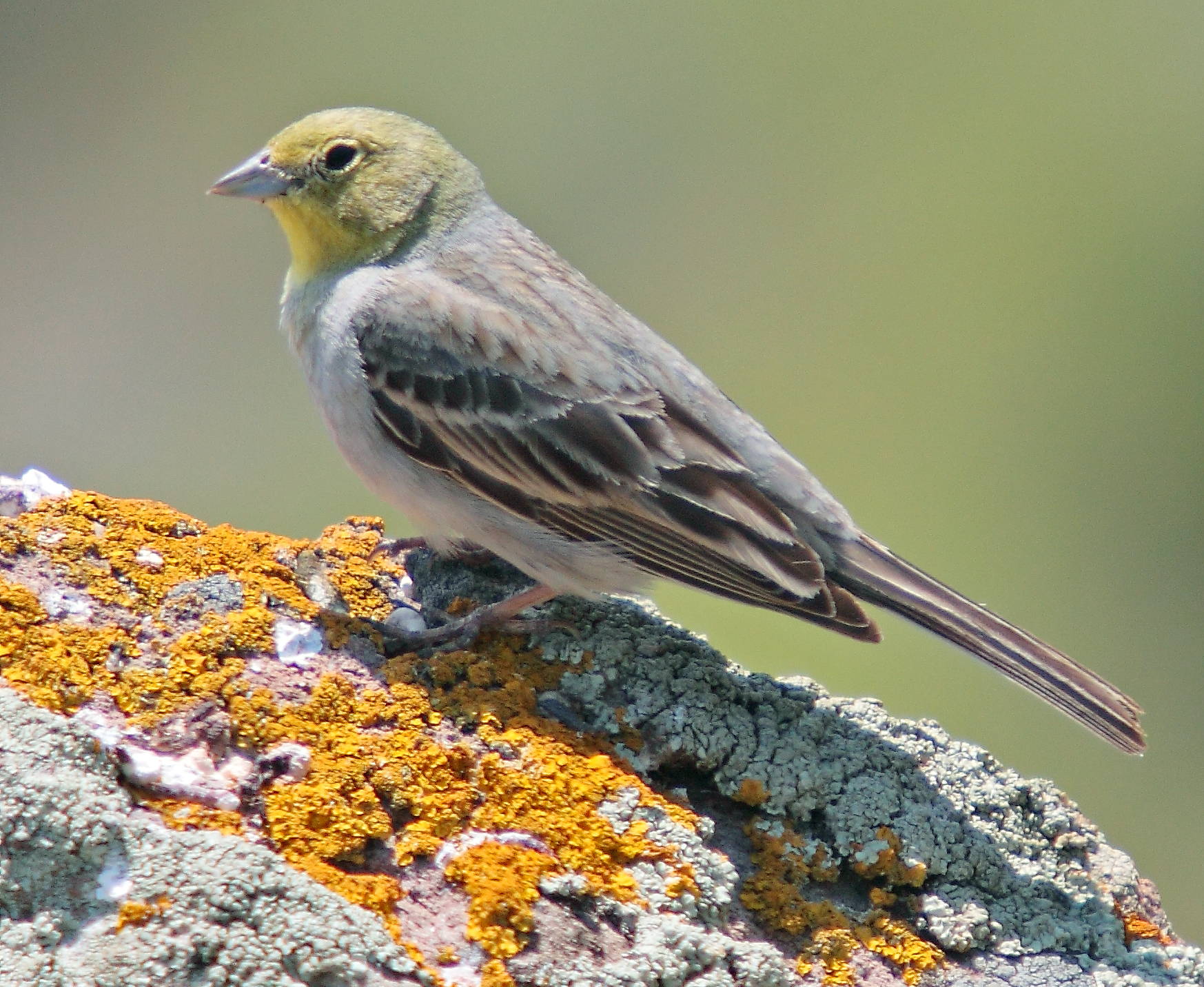
Cinereous bunting

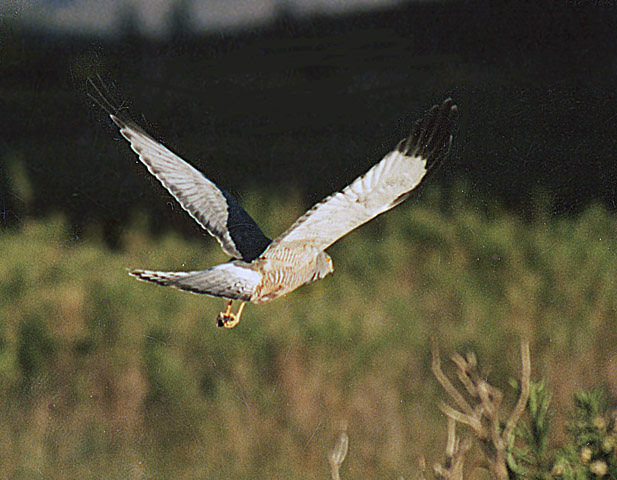
Cinereous harrier

== See also ==
- Animal colouration
- List of colours
