= Postplatyptilia huigraica =

Scientific classification
- Kingdom: Animalia
- Phylum: Arthropoda
- Clade: Pancrustacea
- Class: Insecta
- Order: Lepidoptera
- Family: Pterophoridae
- Genus: Postplatyptilia
- Species: P. huigraica

Binomial name
- Postplatyptilia huigraica B. Landry & Gielis, 1992

Species of plume moth

Postplatyptilia huigraica is a moth of the family Pterophoridae. It is known from Brazil, Colombia, Costa Rica, Ecuador (including the Galápagos Islands), Peru and Venezuela.

The wingspan is 14–15 mm. Adults are on wing in February, June, August, and from October to December. The caterpillars feed on two species of Cantinoa: Cantinoa mutabilis (synonym Hyptis mutabilis) and Cantinoa americana (syn. Hyptis spicigera) in the Lamiaceae.
