= Postplatyptilia corticus =

Scientific classification
- Kingdom: Animalia
- Phylum: Arthropoda
- Class: Insecta
- Order: Lepidoptera
- Family: Pterophoridae
- Genus: Postplatyptilia
- Species: P. corticus

Binomial name
- Postplatyptilia corticus Gielis, 2006

Species of plume moth

Postplatyptilia corticus is a moth of the family Pterophoridae. It is known from Venezuela.

The wingspan is about 20 mm. Adults are on wing in February.

== Etymology ==
The name reflects the bark-like colour of this species.
