= Postplatyptilia palmeri =

Scientific classification
- Kingdom: Animalia
- Phylum: Arthropoda
- Class: Insecta
- Order: Lepidoptera
- Family: Pterophoridae
- Genus: Postplatyptilia
- Species: P. palmeri

Binomial name
- Postplatyptilia palmeri Gielis, 1996

Species of plume moth

Postplatyptilia palmeri is a moth of the family Pterophoridae. It is known from Mexico.

The wingspan is about 14 mm. Adults are on wing in December.
