= Lioptilodes rionegroicus =

Scientific classification
- Kingdom: Animalia
- Phylum: Arthropoda
- Clade: Pancrustacea
- Class: Insecta
- Order: Lepidoptera
- Family: Pterophoridae
- Genus: Lioptilodes
- Species: L. rionegroicus

Binomial name
- Lioptilodes rionegroicus Gielis, 1991

Species of plume moth

Lioptilodes rionegroicus is a species of moth in the genus Lioptilodes known from Argentina, Chile, and Peru. Moths of this species take flight in August and October–January and have a wingspan of approximately 18–20 millimetres.
