= Leptodeuterocopus angulatus =

Scientific classification
- Kingdom: Animalia
- Phylum: Arthropoda
- Class: Insecta
- Order: Lepidoptera
- Family: Pterophoridae
- Genus: Leptodeuterocopus
- Species: L. angulatus

Binomial name
- Leptodeuterocopus angulatus Gielis, 2006

Species of plume moth

Leptodeuterocopus angulatus is a moth of the family Pterophoridae that is known from Brazil.

The wingspan is 13–15 millimetres (0.51–0.59 in). Adults are on wing in September, October and December.
