= Postplatyptilia sandraella =

Scientific classification
- Kingdom: Animalia
- Phylum: Arthropoda
- Class: Insecta
- Order: Lepidoptera
- Family: Pterophoridae
- Genus: Postplatyptilia
- Species: P. sandraella

Binomial name
- Postplatyptilia sandraella Gielis, 1996

Species of plume moth

Postplatyptilia sandraella is a moth of the family Pterophoridae. It is known from Bolivia and Paraguay.

The wingspan is 12–14 mm. Adults are on wing in January.
