= Postplatyptilia flinti =

Scientific classification
- Kingdom: Animalia
- Phylum: Arthropoda
- Clade: Pancrustacea
- Class: Insecta
- Order: Lepidoptera
- Family: Pterophoridae
- Genus: Postplatyptilia
- Species: P. flinti

Binomial name
- Postplatyptilia flinti Gielis, 1991

Species of plume moth

Postplatyptilia flinti is a moth of the family Pterophoridae. It is known from Argentina, Brazil and Paraguay.

The wingspan is about 15 mm. Adults are on wing in December.
