= Postplatyptilia =

Scientific classification
- Kingdom: Animalia
- Phylum: Arthropoda
- Class: Insecta
- Order: Lepidoptera
- Family: Pterophoridae
- Tribe: Platyptiliini
- Genus: Postplatyptilia; Gielis, 1991

Plume moth genus

Postplatyptilia is a genus of moths in the family Pterophoridae.

== Species ==
- Postplatyptilia aestuosa
- Postplatyptilia akerbergsi
- Postplatyptilia alexisi
- Postplatyptilia antillae
- Postplatyptilia biobioica
- Postplatyptilia boletus
- Postplatyptilia camptosphena
- Postplatyptilia carchi
- Postplatyptilia caribica
- Postplatyptilia corticus
- Postplatyptilia drechseli
- Postplatyptilia eelkoi
- Postplatyptilia flinti
- Postplatyptilia fuscicornis
- Postplatyptilia genisei
- Postplatyptilia huigraica
- Postplatyptilia machupicchu
- Postplatyptilia naranja
- Postplatyptilia nebuloarbustum
- Postplatyptilia nielseni
- Postplatyptilia nubleica
- Postplatyptilia palmeri
- Postplatyptilia paraglyptis
- Postplatyptilia parana
- Postplatyptilia pluvia
- Postplatyptilia pusillus
- Postplatyptilia saeva
- Postplatyptilia sandraella
- Postplatyptilia seitetazas
- Postplatyptilia talcaica
- Postplatyptilia transversus
- Postplatyptilia triangulocosta
- Postplatyptilia ugartei
- Postplatyptilia uruguayensis
- Postplatyptilia vorbecki
- Postplatyptilia zongoensis
