= Lioptilodes brasilicus =

Scientific classification
- Kingdom: Animalia
- Phylum: Arthropoda
- Clade: Pancrustacea
- Class: Insecta
- Order: Lepidoptera
- Family: Pterophoridae
- Genus: Lioptilodes
- Species: L. brasilicus

Binomial name
- Lioptilodes brasilicus Gielis, 2006

Species of plume moth

Lioptilodes brasilicus is a species of moth in the genus Lioptilodes known from Argentina and Brazil. Moths of this species take flight in October and have a wingspan of approximately 21–22 millimetres.
