= Postplatyptilia biobioica =

Scientific classification
- Kingdom: Animalia
- Phylum: Arthropoda
- Class: Insecta
- Order: Lepidoptera
- Family: Pterophoridae
- Genus: Postplatyptilia
- Species: P. biobioica

Binomial name
- Postplatyptilia biobioica Gielis, 1991

Species of plume moth

Postplatyptilia biobioica is a moth of the family Pterophoridae. It is known from Chile.

The wingspan is about 19 mm. Adults are on wing in January.
