= Postplatyptilia triangulocosta =

Scientific classification
- Kingdom: Animalia
- Phylum: Arthropoda
- Class: Insecta
- Order: Lepidoptera
- Family: Pterophoridae
- Genus: Postplatyptilia
- Species: P. triangulocosta

Binomial name
- Postplatyptilia triangulocosta Gielis, 1996

Species of plume moth

Postplatyptilia triangulocosta is a moth of the family Pterophoridae. It is known from Argentina and Peru.

The wingspan is about 20 mm. Adults are on wing in January and August.
