= Lioptilodes cuzcoicus =

Scientific classification
- Kingdom: Animalia
- Phylum: Arthropoda
- Clade: Pancrustacea
- Class: Insecta
- Order: Lepidoptera
- Family: Pterophoridae
- Genus: Lioptilodes
- Species: L. cuzcoicus

Binomial name
- Lioptilodes cuzcoicus Gielis, 1996

Species of plume moth

Lioptilodes cuzcoicus is a moth of the family Pterophoridae. It is known from Ecuador and Peru.

The wingspan is about 23 mm. Adults are on wing in August.

This species is characterized by the relatively small second lobe of the forewing.
