= Postplatyptilia boletus =

Scientific classification
- Kingdom: Animalia
- Phylum: Arthropoda
- Class: Insecta
- Order: Lepidoptera
- Family: Pterophoridae
- Genus: Postplatyptilia
- Species: P. boletus

Binomial name
- Postplatyptilia boletus Gielis, 2006

Species of plume moth

Postplatyptilia boletus is a moth of the family Pterophoridae. It is known from Peru.

The wingspan is about 14 mm. Adults are on wing in October.

== Etymology ==
The name reflects the mushroom shaped antrum.
