= Postplatyptilia pusillus =

Scientific classification
- Kingdom: Animalia
- Phylum: Arthropoda
- Class: Insecta
- Order: Lepidoptera
- Family: Pterophoridae
- Genus: Postplatyptilia
- Species: P. pusillus

Binomial name
- Postplatyptilia pusillus (Philippi, 1864)

Synonyms
- Pterophorus pusillus Philippi, 1864

Species of plume moth

Postplatyptilia pusillus is a moth of the family Pterophoridae. It was described by Rodolfo Amando Philippi in 1864.

The type specimens are all lost. Philipp Christoph Zeller stated in 1877: "it is hardly possible to determine what species is involved by the description made." Cees Gielis stated in 2006: "This is however not correct, because the mentioning of: 'die Fuehler sind am Grunde blass rosenroth' [the feet are pale rose red at the bottom], gives a good characteristic."
