= Lioptilodes topali =

Scientific classification
- Kingdom: Animalia
- Phylum: Arthropoda
- Clade: Pancrustacea
- Class: Insecta
- Order: Lepidoptera
- Family: Pterophoridae
- Genus: Lioptilodes
- Species: L. topali

Binomial name
- Lioptilodes topali Gielis, 1991

Species of plume moth

Lioptilodes topali is a species of moth in the genus Lioptilodes known from Argentina. Moths of this species take flight in March, May and November and have a wingspan of approximately 29–32 millimetres.
