= Postplatyptilia drechseli =

Scientific classification
- Kingdom: Animalia
- Phylum: Arthropoda
- Class: Insecta
- Order: Lepidoptera
- Family: Pterophoridae
- Genus: Postplatyptilia
- Species: P. drechseli

Binomial name
- Postplatyptilia drechseli Gielis, 2006

Species of plume moth

Postplatyptilia drechseli is a moth of the family Pterophoridae. It is known from Paraguay.

The wingspan is about 15 mm. Adults are on wing in October.
