= Leptodeuterocopus sorongensis =

Scientific classification
- Kingdom: Animalia
- Phylum: Arthropoda
- Class: Insecta
- Order: Lepidoptera
- Family: Pterophoridae
- Genus: Leptodeuterocopus
- Species: L. sorongensis

Binomial name
- Leptodeuterocopus sorongensis Gielis & de Vos, 2007

Species of plume moth

Leptodeuterocopus sorongensis is a moth of the family Pterophoridae that is known from Papua New Guinea.

The wingspan is about 12 millimetres (0.47 in). Adults are on wing in March.
