= Lioptilodes yungas =

Scientific classification
- Kingdom: Animalia
- Phylum: Arthropoda
- Clade: Pancrustacea
- Class: Insecta
- Order: Lepidoptera
- Family: Pterophoridae
- Genus: Lioptilodes
- Species: L. yungas

Binomial name
- Lioptilodes yungas Gielis, 2006

Species of plume moth

Lioptilodes yungas is a species of moth in the genus Lioptilodes known from Bolivia. Moths of this species take flight in May and have a wingspan of approximately 24 millimetres. The species name "yungas" is derived from the region Yungas, whence the species was collected for examination.
