= Postplatyptilia vorbecki =

Scientific classification
- Kingdom: Animalia
- Phylum: Arthropoda
- Class: Insecta
- Order: Lepidoptera
- Family: Pterophoridae
- Genus: Postplatyptilia
- Species: P. vorbecki

Binomial name
- Postplatyptilia vorbecki Gielis, 2006

Species of plume moth

Postplatyptilia vorbecki is a moth of the family Pterophoridae. It is known from Ecuador.

The wingspan is about 17 mm. Adults are on wing in September and October.

== Etymology ==
The species is named after its collector, Mr Vorbeck.
