= Postplatyptilia nebuloarbustum =

Scientific classification
- Kingdom: Animalia
- Phylum: Arthropoda
- Class: Insecta
- Order: Lepidoptera
- Family: Pterophoridae
- Genus: Postplatyptilia
- Species: P. nebuloarbustum

Binomial name
- Postplatyptilia nebuloarbustum Gielis, 2006

Species of plume moth

Postplatyptilia nebuloarbustum is a moth of the family Pterophoridae. It is known from Ecuador.

The wingspan is about 20 mm. Adults are on wing in October.

== Etymology ==
The names reflects the conditions of the collecting spot, a high altitude cloud forest.
