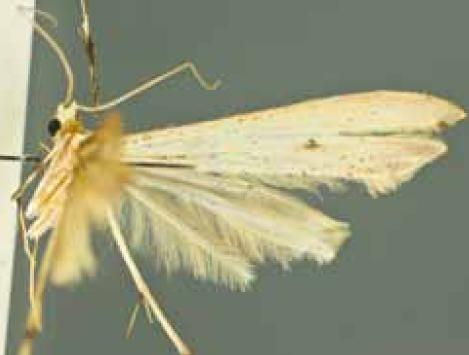

Scientific classification
- Kingdom: Animalia
- Phylum: Arthropoda
- Class: Insecta
- Order: Lepidoptera
- Family: Pterophoridae
- Genus: Hellinsia
- Species: H. orellanai

Binomial name
- Hellinsia orellanai Gielis, 2011

= Hellinsia orellanai =

Species of plume moth

Hellinsia orellanai is a moth of the family Pterophoridae that is endemic to Ecuador.

The wingspan is 23 millimetres (0.91 in). Adults are on wing in November, at an altitude of 2,650 metres (8,690 ft).
