= Lioptilodes neuquenicus =

Scientific classification
- Kingdom: Animalia
- Phylum: Arthropoda
- Clade: Pancrustacea
- Class: Insecta
- Order: Lepidoptera
- Family: Pterophoridae
- Genus: Lioptilodes
- Species: L. neuquenicus

Binomial name
- Lioptilodes neuquenicus Gielis, 1991

Species of plume moth

Lioptilodes neuquenicus is a species of moth in the genus Lioptilodes known from Argentina, Chile, and Peru. Moths of this species take flight in October, November and January and have a wingspan of approximately 14–16 millimetres.
