= Postplatyptilia nielseni =

Scientific classification
- Kingdom: Animalia
- Phylum: Arthropoda
- Class: Insecta
- Order: Lepidoptera
- Family: Pterophoridae
- Genus: Postplatyptilia
- Species: P. nielseni

Binomial name
- Postplatyptilia nielseni (Gielis, 1991)

Synonyms
- Lantanophaga nielseni Gielis, 1991

Species of plume moth

Postplatyptilia nielseni is a moth of the family Pterophoridae. It is known from Argentina.

The wingspan is 16–18 mm. Adults are on wing from December to February.
