= Lioptilodes aguilaicus =

Scientific classification
- Kingdom: Animalia
- Phylum: Arthropoda
- Clade: Pancrustacea
- Class: Insecta
- Order: Lepidoptera
- Family: Pterophoridae
- Genus: Lioptilodes
- Species: L. aguilaicus

Binomial name
- Lioptilodes aguilaicus Gielis, 2006

Species of plume moth

Lioptilodes aguilaicus is a species of moth in the genus Lioptilodes known from Argentina. Moths of this species take flight in October and December and have a wingspan of approximately 19-23 millimetres.
