= Postplatyptilia pluvia =

Scientific classification
- Kingdom: Animalia
- Phylum: Arthropoda
- Class: Insecta
- Order: Lepidoptera
- Family: Pterophoridae
- Genus: Postplatyptilia
- Species: P. pluvia

Binomial name
- Postplatyptilia pluvia Gielis, 2006

Species of plume moth

Postplatyptilia pluvia is a moth of the family Pterophoridae. It is known from Ecuador.

The wingspan is 18–21 mm. Adults are on wing in October.
