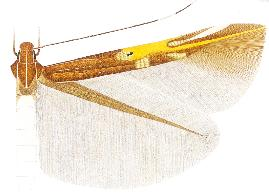

Scientific classification
- Kingdom: Animalia
- Phylum: Arthropoda
- Clade: Pancrustacea
- Class: Insecta
- Order: Lepidoptera
- Family: Cosmopterigidae
- Genus: Cosmopterix
- Species: C. gielisorum

Binomial name
- Cosmopterix gielisorum Koster, 2010

= Cosmopterix gielisorum =

Species of moth

Cosmopterix gielisorum is a moth of the family Cosmopterigidae. It is from Ecuador.

Adults have been recorded in October.

== Description ==
Male. Forewing length 4.8 mm. Head: frons shining ochreous-white with greenish and reddish reflections, vertex shining olive brown with greenish and reddish reflections, neck tufts and collar olive brown with reddish reflection; labial palpus first segment very short, white, second segment three-quarters of the length of third, dark brown with white longitudinal lines laterally and ventrally, third segment white, brown lined laterally; scape dark brown with a white anterior line, white ventrally, antenna shining dark brown with a white line from base to one-half, in middle interrupted, followed towards apex by fourteen dark brown segments, eleven white, eleven dark brown and five white segments at apex. Thorax and tegulae shining olive brown with greenish and reddish gloss, thorax with a white median line, tegulae lined white inwardly. Legs: shining olive brown, foreleg and midleg dark brown dorsally, femora of midleg and hindleg shining ochreous, foreleg with a white line on tibia and tarsal segments one, two and segment three in basal half, segment five entirely white, tibia of midleg with an oblique narrow white basal line, a white medial spot and a white apical ring, tarsal segment one with a lateral white line and a white apical ring, segment two with a white dorsal line in the distal half and segment five entirely white, tibia of hindleg as midleg, but with an additional ochreous subapical ring and blackish-brown hair pencils before and after the medial line, tarsal segments one to three dark greyish brown, segment four dorsally white and segment five entirely white, spurs ochreous-white dorsally, dark grey ventrally. Forewing shining greyish brown with reddish gloss, costal half from base towards transverse fascia and below fold olive brown, four very narrow white lines with greenish reflection in the basal area, a subcostal from base to one-third, bending from costa in distal third, a medial above fold, almost from base to just before the end of the subcostal, an oblique and very short subdorsal from one-third, a short dorsal from beyond base to one-fifth, a yellow transverse fascia in the middle, greyish brown in dorsal half, with a long apical protrusion in the middle and extending as an apical line into the apical cilia, bordered at the inner edge by two tubercular very pale golden metallic subcostal and dorsal spots with greenish reflection, the subcostal spot much more towards base and with patch of blackish scales on outside, bordered at the outer edge by two similar coloured longitudinal costal and dorsal spots, both spots opposite, the outer costal spot lined brown inwardly, a long white costal streak beyond the outer costal spot, cilia olive brown, greyish brown towards dorsum. Hindwing shining brownish grey with some reddish gloss, cilia greyish brown. Underside: forewing shining greyish brown, the white costal streak and the yellow apical line distinctly visible, hindwing shining greyish brown.

== Etymology ==
The species is dedicated to Dr. Cees Gielis and his wife Siska, Lexmond, the Netherlands, as collectors of this species.
