= Postplatyptilia nubleica =

Scientific classification
- Kingdom: Animalia
- Phylum: Arthropoda
- Class: Insecta
- Order: Lepidoptera
- Family: Pterophoridae
- Genus: Postplatyptilia
- Species: P. nubleica

Binomial name
- Postplatyptilia nubleica Gielis, 1991

Species of plume moth

Postplatyptilia nubleica is a moth of the family Pterophoridae. It is known from Argentina.

The wingspan is 18–21 mm. Adults are on wing in January.
