= Postplatyptilia carchi =

Scientific classification
- Kingdom: Animalia
- Phylum: Arthropoda
- Class: Insecta
- Order: Lepidoptera
- Family: Pterophoridae
- Genus: Postplatyptilia
- Species: P. carchi

Binomial name
- Postplatyptilia carchi Gielis, 2006

Species of plume moth

Postplatyptilia carchi is a moth of the family Pterophoridae. It is known from Colombia, Ecuador and Venezuela.

The wingspan is 13–15 mm. Adults are on wing in January, February and May.

== Etymology ==
The species is named after the province where it was collected, Carchi.
