= Postplatyptilia machupicchu =

Scientific classification
- Kingdom: Animalia
- Phylum: Arthropoda
- Class: Insecta
- Order: Lepidoptera
- Family: Pterophoridae
- Genus: Postplatyptilia
- Species: P. machupicchu

Binomial name
- Postplatyptilia machupicchu Gielis, 1996

Species of plume moth

Postplatyptilia machupicchu is a moth of the family Pterophoridae. It is known from Peru.

The wingspan is about 20 mm. Adults are on wing in August.
