= Lioptilodes fetisi =

Scientific classification
- Kingdom: Animalia
- Phylum: Arthropoda
- Clade: Pancrustacea
- Class: Insecta
- Order: Lepidoptera
- Family: Pterophoridae
- Genus: Lioptilodes
- Species: L. fetisi

Binomial name
- Lioptilodes fetisi Gielis, 1991

Species of plume moth

Lioptilodes fetisi is a species of moth in the genus Lioptilodes known from Chile. Moths of this species take flight in December and have a wingspan of approximately 21 millimetres. Lioptilodes fetisi is noted for its cream-white colour.
