= Lioptilodes limbani =

Scientific classification
- Kingdom: Animalia
- Phylum: Arthropoda
- Clade: Pancrustacea
- Class: Insecta
- Order: Lepidoptera
- Family: Pterophoridae
- Genus: Lioptilodes
- Species: L. limbani

Binomial name
- Lioptilodes limbani Gielis, 1996

Species of plume moth

Lioptilodes limbani is a species of moth in the genus Lioptilodes known from Bolivia and Peru. Moths of this species take flight in April and May and have a wingspan of approximately 25 millimetres.
