= Lioptilodes zapalaicus =

Scientific classification
- Kingdom: Animalia
- Phylum: Arthropoda
- Clade: Pancrustacea
- Class: Insecta
- Order: Lepidoptera
- Family: Pterophoridae
- Genus: Lioptilodes
- Species: L. zapalaicus

Binomial name
- Lioptilodes zapalaicus Gielis, 1991

Species of plume moth

Lioptilodes zapalaicus is a species of moth in the genus Lioptilodes known from Argentina and Peru. Moths of this species take flight in October, December, January, and April, and have a wingspan of approximately 18–21 millimetres.
