= Lioptilodes altivolans =

Scientific classification
- Kingdom: Animalia
- Phylum: Arthropoda
- Clade: Pancrustacea
- Class: Insecta
- Order: Lepidoptera
- Family: Pterophoridae
- Genus: Lioptilodes
- Species: L. altivolans

Binomial name
- Lioptilodes altivolans Gielis, 2006

Species of plume moth

Lioptilodes altivolans is a species of moth in the genus Lioptilodes known from Peru. Moths of this species take flight in February and have a wingspan of approximately 18 millimetres. The specific name "altivolans" refers to the high altitude, 4,100 metres, at which the moths fly.
