= Leptodeuterocopus trinidad =

Scientific classification
- Kingdom: Animalia
- Phylum: Arthropoda
- Class: Insecta
- Order: Lepidoptera
- Family: Pterophoridae
- Genus: Leptodeuterocopus
- Species: L. trinidad

Binomial name
- Leptodeuterocopus trinidad Gielis, 1996

Species of plume moth

Leptodeuterocopus trinidad is a moth of the family Pterophoridae that is known from Trinidad and Venezuela.

The wingspan is 12–14 millimetres (0.47–0.55 in). Adults are on wing from January to March.
