= Postplatyptilia akerbergsi =

Scientific classification
- Kingdom: Animalia
- Phylum: Arthropoda
- Class: Insecta
- Order: Lepidoptera
- Family: Pterophoridae
- Genus: Postplatyptilia
- Species: P. akerbergsi

Binomial name
- Postplatyptilia akerbergsi Gielis, 1991

Species of plume moth

Postplatyptilia akerbergsi is a moth of the family Pterophoridae. It is known to be from Chile.

The wingspan is about 19 mm. Adults are on wing in January.
