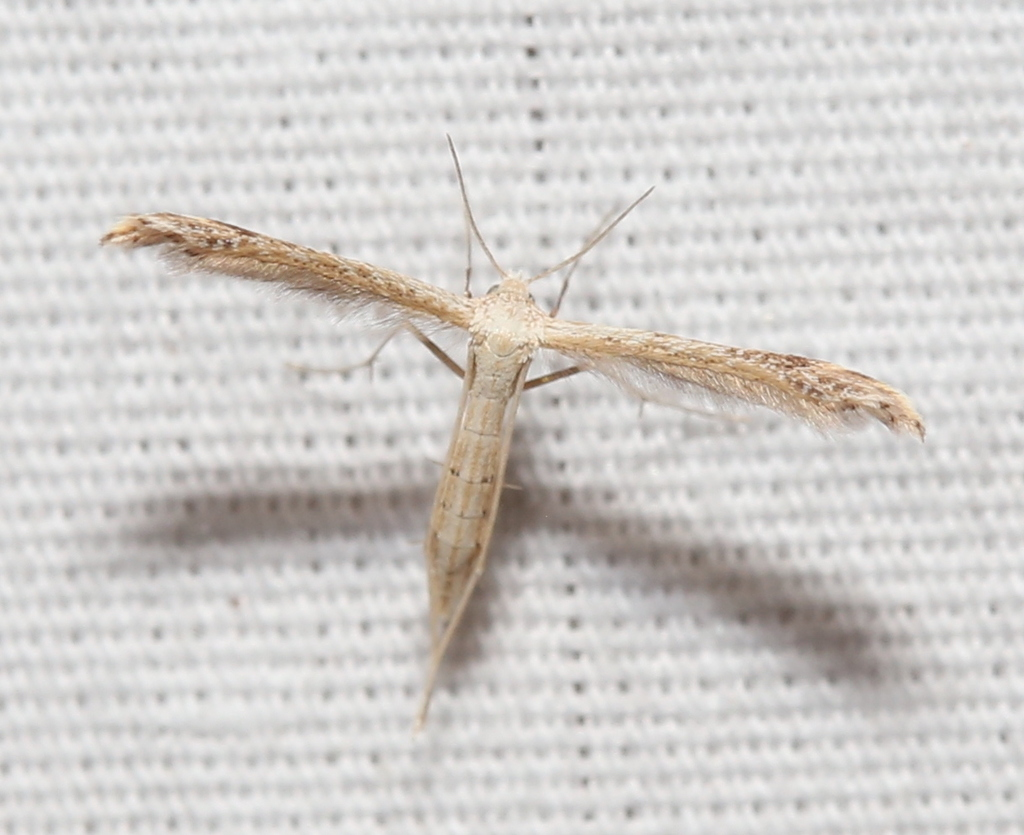

Scientific classification
- Kingdom: Animalia
- Phylum: Arthropoda
- Clade: Pancrustacea
- Class: Insecta
- Order: Lepidoptera
- Family: Pterophoridae
- Genus: Lioptilodes
- Species: L. albistriolatus

Binomial name
- Lioptilodes albistriolatus (Zeller, 1877)

Synonyms
- Mimeseoptilus albistriolatus Zeller, 1877; Lioptilodes parvus (Walsingham, 1880); Lioptilus parvus Walsingham, 1880; Pterophorus parvus; Stenoptilia insperata Meyrick, 1921; Stenoptilia trigonometra Meyrick, 1931; Stenoptilia partiseca Meyrick, 1931

= Lioptilodes albistriolatus =

Species of plume moth

Lioptilodes albistriolatus is a moth of the family Pterophoridae. In South America and Central America it has been recorded from Argentina, Brazil, Chile, Costa Rica, Cuba, Ecuador, Guatemala, Paraguay, Peru and Puerto Rico. It is also present in North America, where it is known from Mexico, California, Texas, New Mexico and Arizona. It is an introduced species in Hawaii.

The wingspan is 15–20 mm. The intensity of the color and markings is variable. Adults are on wing in January, February, March, May, June, August, November and December.

The larvae feed on various Asteraceae species, including Erigeron maximus, Erigeron strigosus, Conyza bonariensis, Conyza primulifolia, Conyza canadensis, Diplostephium ericoides, Baccharis salicifolia, Baccharis trinervis, Baccharis discolor, Baccharis serratula, Senecio pinnatus, Minasia species, Noticastrum decumbens, Symphyotrichum elliottii, Symphyotrichum subulatus and Solidago odora. They feed inside the flower heads.
