= Lioptilodes parafuscicostatus =

Scientific classification
- Kingdom: Animalia
- Phylum: Arthropoda
- Clade: Pancrustacea
- Class: Insecta
- Order: Lepidoptera
- Family: Pterophoridae
- Genus: Lioptilodes
- Species: L. parafuscicostatus

Binomial name
- Lioptilodes parafuscicostatus Gielis, 1996

Species of plume moth

Lioptilodes parafuscicostatus is a species of moth in the genus Lioptilodes known from Ecuador and possibly Peru. Moths of this species have a wingspan of approximately 23.5 millimetres. The species closely resembles its sister taxon, Lioptilodes fuscicostata.
