= Leptodeuterocopus tungurahue =

Scientific classification
- Kingdom: Animalia
- Phylum: Arthropoda
- Class: Insecta
- Order: Lepidoptera
- Family: Pterophoridae
- Genus: Leptodeuterocopus
- Species: L. tungurahue

Binomial name
- Leptodeuterocopus tungurahue Gielis, 2006

Species of plume moth

Leptodeuterocopus tungurahue is a moth of the family Pterophoridae that is known from Ecuador.

The wingspan is about 12 millimetres (0.47 in). Adults are on wing in September.
