= Lioptilodes doeri =

Scientific classification
- Kingdom: Animalia
- Phylum: Arthropoda
- Clade: Pancrustacea
- Class: Insecta
- Order: Lepidoptera
- Family: Pterophoridae
- Genus: Lioptilodes
- Species: L. doeri

Binomial name
- Lioptilodes doeri Gielis, 1996

Species of plume moth

Lioptilodes doeri is a species of moth in the genus Lioptilodes known from Argentina, Brazil, and Peru. Moths of this species take flight in August and October and have a wingspan of approximately 22–23 millimetres.
