= Postplatyptilia seitetazas =

Scientific classification
- Kingdom: Animalia
- Phylum: Arthropoda
- Class: Insecta
- Order: Lepidoptera
- Family: Pterophoridae
- Genus: Postplatyptilia
- Species: P. seitetazas

Binomial name
- Postplatyptilia seitetazas Gielis, 2006

Species of plume moth

Postplatyptilia seitetazas is a moth of the family Pterophoridae. It is known from Chile.

The wingspan is about 15 mm. Adults are on wing in January.

== Etymology ==
The species is named after the locality in which it was collected.
