= Lioptilodes salarius =

Scientific classification
- Kingdom: Animalia
- Phylum: Arthropoda
- Clade: Pancrustacea
- Class: Insecta
- Order: Lepidoptera
- Family: Pterophoridae
- Genus: Lioptilodes
- Species: L. salarius

Binomial name
- Lioptilodes salarius Gielis, 2006

Species of plume moth

Lioptilodes salarius is a species of moth in the genus Lioptilodes known from Argentina. Moths of this species take flight in January and have a wingspan of approximately 36 millimetres. The specific name "salarias" refers to Salar de Jama, whence the species was collected.
