= Postplatyptilia parana =

Scientific classification
- Kingdom: Animalia
- Phylum: Arthropoda
- Class: Insecta
- Order: Lepidoptera
- Family: Pterophoridae
- Genus: Postplatyptilia
- Species: P. parana

Binomial name
- Postplatyptilia parana Gielis, 1996

Species of plume moth

Postplatyptilia parana is a moth of the family Pterophoridae. It is known from Argentina, Brazil and Costa Rica.

The wingspan is about 20 mm.
