= Lioptilodes alolepidodactylus =

Scientific classification
- Kingdom: Animalia
- Phylum: Arthropoda
- Clade: Pancrustacea
- Class: Insecta
- Order: Lepidoptera
- Family: Pterophoridae
- Genus: Lioptilodes
- Species: L. alolepidodactylus

Binomial name
- Lioptilodes alolepidodactylus Gielis, 1991

Species of plume moth

Lioptilodes alolepidodactylus is a species of moth in the genus Lioptilodes known from Argentina and Chile. Moths of this species take flight from October to December and have a wingspan of 23-25 millimetres.
