= Lioptilodes subantarcticus =

Scientific classification
- Kingdom: Animalia
- Phylum: Arthropoda
- Clade: Pancrustacea
- Class: Insecta
- Order: Lepidoptera
- Family: Pterophoridae
- Genus: Lioptilodes
- Species: L. subantarcticus

Binomial name
- Lioptilodes subantarcticus Gielis, 1991

Species of plume moth

Lioptilodes subantarcticus is a moth of the family Pterophoridae. It is known from Argentina and Brazil.

The wingspan is 19–21 mm. Adults are on wing in January and February.

The larvae feed on Gnaphistylis itatiatiae, Senecio juergensi, Senecio conyzaefolius, Senecio pinnatus and Senecio oleosus.
