= Leptodeuterocopus duchicela =

Scientific classification
- Kingdom: Animalia
- Phylum: Arthropoda
- Class: Insecta
- Order: Lepidoptera
- Family: Pterophoridae
- Genus: Leptodeuterocopus
- Species: L. duchicela

Binomial name
- Leptodeuterocopus duchicela Gielis, 2006

Species of plume moth

Leptodeuterocopus duchicela is a moth of the family Pterophoridae. It is known from Ecuador.

The wingspan is 14–15 mm. Adults are on wing in January.

== Taxonomy and distribution ==
Leptodeuterocopus duchicela was described by Dutch entomologist Cees Gielis in 2006 as part of a systematic review of Neotropical plume moths. It is placed within the tribe Deuterocopini of the family Pterophoridae. The species is endemic to Ecuador, with the type specimens collected near Papallacta in Napo Province, part of the eastern Andes. These moths were observed at elevations ranging from 1,000 to 3,700 meters above sea level, suggesting adaptation to high-altitude environments. No other countries have reported occurrences of this species to date, and little is known about its ecology beyond adult flight records in January.
