= Lioptilodes arequipa =

Scientific classification
- Kingdom: Animalia
- Phylum: Arthropoda
- Clade: Pancrustacea
- Class: Insecta
- Order: Lepidoptera
- Family: Pterophoridae
- Genus: Lioptilodes
- Species: L. arequipa

Binomial name
- Lioptilodes arequipa Gielis, 2006

Species of plume moth

Lioptilodes arequipa is a species of moth in the genus Lioptilodes known from Peru and Chile. Moths of this species take flight in January and April and have a wingspan of approximately 21 millimetres. The specific name "arequipa" refers to the Arequipa Region, where the Peruvian specimen was collected.
