= Postplatyptilia transversus =

Scientific classification
- Kingdom: Animalia
- Phylum: Arthropoda
- Class: Insecta
- Order: Lepidoptera
- Family: Pterophoridae
- Genus: Postplatyptilia
- Species: P. transversus

Binomial name
- Postplatyptilia transversus Gielis, 2006

Species of plume moth

Postplatyptilia transversus is a moth of the family Pterophoridae. It is known from Brazil and Colombia.

The wingspan is 15–16 mm. Adults are on wing in March in Colombia and in September in Brazil.
