= Postplatyptilia uruguayensis =

Scientific classification
- Kingdom: Animalia
- Phylum: Arthropoda
- Class: Insecta
- Order: Lepidoptera
- Family: Pterophoridae
- Genus: Postplatyptilia
- Species: P. uruguayensis

Binomial name
- Postplatyptilia uruguayensis Gielis, 2006

Species of plume moth

Postplatyptilia uruguayensis is a moth of the family Pterophoridae. It is known from Uruguay.

The wingspan is about 18 mm. Adults are on wing in March.

== Etymology ==
The species is named after the country in which it was discovered.
