= Lioptilodes cocodrilo =

Scientific classification
- Kingdom: Animalia
- Phylum: Arthropoda
- Clade: Pancrustacea
- Class: Insecta
- Order: Lepidoptera
- Family: Pterophoridae
- Genus: Lioptilodes
- Species: L. cocodrilo

Binomial name
- Lioptilodes cocodrilo Gielis, 2006

Species of plume moth

Lioptilodes cocodrilo is a species of moth in the genus Lioptilodes known from Ecuador. Moths of this species take flight in September, October, December, and January, and have a wingspan of approximately 16 millimetres. The specific name "cocodrilo" references Cocodrilo Ranger Station.
