= Postplatyptilia naranja =

Scientific classification
- Kingdom: Animalia
- Phylum: Arthropoda
- Class: Insecta
- Order: Lepidoptera
- Family: Pterophoridae
- Genus: Postplatyptilia
- Species: P. naranja

Binomial name
- Postplatyptilia naranja Gielis, 1991

Species of plume moth

Postplatyptilia naranja is a moth of the family Pterophoridae. It is known from Argentina.

The wingspan is 17–19 mm. Adults are on wing at the end of December and early in January.
