= Postplatyptilia antillae =

Scientific classification
- Kingdom: Animalia
- Phylum: Arthropoda
- Class: Insecta
- Order: Lepidoptera
- Family: Pterophoridae
- Genus: Postplatyptilia
- Species: P. antillae

Binomial name
- Postplatyptilia antillae Gielis, 2006

Species of plume moth

Postplatyptilia antillae is a moth of the family Pterophoridae. It is known from Cuba and Jamaica.

The wingspan is about 18 mm. Adults are on wing in July.
