= Postplatyptilia eelkoi =

Scientific classification
- Kingdom: Animalia
- Phylum: Arthropoda
- Class: Insecta
- Order: Lepidoptera
- Family: Pterophoridae
- Genus: Postplatyptilia
- Species: P. eelkoi

Binomial name
- Postplatyptilia eelkoi Gielis, 1991

Species of plume moth

Postplatyptilia eelkoi is a moth of the family Pterophoridae. It is known from Chile.

The wingspan is 16–18 mm. Adults are on wing in December and January.
