= Leptodeuterocopus panamaensis =

Scientific classification
- Kingdom: Animalia
- Phylum: Arthropoda
- Class: Insecta
- Order: Lepidoptera
- Family: Pterophoridae
- Genus: Leptodeuterocopus
- Species: L. panamaensis

Binomial name
- Leptodeuterocopus panamaensis Gielis, 2006

Species of plume moth

Leptodeuterocopus panamaensis is a moth of the family Pterophoridae that is known from Panama.

The wingspan is about 14 millimetres (0.55 in). Adults are on wing in March.
