= Postplatyptilia caribica =

Scientific classification
- Kingdom: Animalia
- Phylum: Arthropoda
- Class: Insecta
- Order: Lepidoptera
- Family: Pterophoridae
- Genus: Postplatyptilia
- Species: P. caribica

Binomial name
- Postplatyptilia caribica Gielis, 2006

Species of plume moth

Postplatyptilia caribica is a moth of the family Pterophoridae. It is known from Dominica and Puerto Rico.

The wingspan is about 14 mm. Adults are on wing in March.

== Etymology ==
The name reflects the area of distribution, the Caribbean islands.
