= Postplatyptilia zongoensis =

Scientific classification
- Kingdom: Animalia
- Phylum: Arthropoda
- Class: Insecta
- Order: Lepidoptera
- Family: Pterophoridae
- Genus: Postplatyptilia
- Species: P. zongoensis

Binomial name
- Postplatyptilia zongoensis Gielis, 2006

Species of plume moth

Postplatyptilia zongoensis is a moth of the family Pterophoridae. It is known throughout Bolivia.

The wingspan is about 27 mm. Adults are on wing in April.

== Etymology ==
The name reflects the river valley where it occurs, the Zongo River valley.
