= Diplostephium macrocephalum =

Conservation status
- Near Threatened (IUCN 3.1)

Scientific classification
- Kingdom: Plantae
- Clade: Tracheophytes
- Clade: Angiosperms
- Clade: Eudicots
- Clade: Asterids
- Order: Asterales
- Family: Asteraceae
- Genus: Diplostephium
- Species: D. macrocephalum

Binomial name
- Diplostephium macrocephalum S.F.Blake

Species of flowering plant

Diplostephium macrocephalum is a species of flowering plant in the family Asteraceae. It is found only in Ecuador. Its natural habitats are subtropical or tropical moist montane forests, subtropical or tropical dry shrubland, subtropical or tropical high-altitude shrubland, and subtropical or tropical high-altitude grassland. It is threatened by habitat loss.
