= Diplostephium juniperinum =

Conservation status
- Endangered (IUCN 3.1)

Scientific classification
- Kingdom: Plantae
- Clade: Tracheophytes
- Clade: Angiosperms
- Clade: Eudicots
- Clade: Asterids
- Order: Asterales
- Family: Asteraceae
- Genus: Diplostephium
- Species: D. juniperinum

Binomial name
- Diplostephium juniperinum Cuatrec.

Species of flowering plant

Diplostephium juniperinum is a species of flowering plant in the family Asteraceae. It is found only in Ecuador. Its natural habitat is subtropical or tropical moist montane forests. It is threatened by habitat loss. Its essential oil exhibits anticholinesterase effect.
