= Leptodeuterocopus exquisitus =

Scientific classification
- Kingdom: Animalia
- Phylum: Arthropoda
- Class: Insecta
- Order: Lepidoptera
- Family: Pterophoridae
- Genus: Leptodeuterocopus
- Species: L. exquisitus

Binomial name
- Leptodeuterocopus exquisitus (Meyrick, 1921)

Synonyms
- Deuterocopus exquisitus Meyrick, 1921

Species of plume moth

Leptodeuterocopus exquisitus is a moth of the family Pterophoridae that is known from Brazil.

The wingspan is about 11 millimetres (0.43 in). Adults are on wing in November.
