= Postplatyptilia camptosphena =

Scientific classification
- Kingdom: Animalia
- Phylum: Arthropoda
- Class: Insecta
- Order: Lepidoptera
- Family: Pterophoridae
- Genus: Postplatyptilia
- Species: P. camptosphena

Binomial name
- Postplatyptilia camptosphena (Meyrick, 1931)

Synonyms
- Platyptilia camptosphena Meyrick, 1931

Species of plume moth

Postplatyptilia camptosphena is a moth of the family Pterophoridae. It is known from Argentina.

The wingspan is 15–22 mm. Adults are on wing from November to February.
