= Lioptilodes testaceus =

Scientific classification
- Kingdom: Animalia
- Phylum: Arthropoda
- Clade: Pancrustacea
- Class: Insecta
- Order: Lepidoptera
- Family: Pterophoridae
- Genus: Lioptilodes
- Species: L. testaceus

Binomial name
- Lioptilodes testaceus Blanchard, 1852

Synonyms
- Pterophorus testaceus Blanchard, 1852

Species of plume moth

Lioptilodes testaceus is a species of moth in the genus Lioptilodes known from Chile. Moths of this species take flight in July, and October–December and have a wingspan of 20–23 millimetres.
