= Diplostephium serratifolium =

Scientific classification
- Kingdom: Plantae
- Clade: Tracheophytes
- Clade: Angiosperms
- Clade: Eudicots
- Clade: Asterids
- Order: Asterales
- Family: Asteraceae
- Genus: Diplostephium
- Species: D. serratifolium

Binomial name
- Diplostephium serratifolium Cuatrec.

Synonyms
- Dysaster cajamarcensis H.Rob. & V.A.Funk

Genus of flowering plants

Diplostephium serratifolium is a species of flowering plant in the family Asteraceae. It is endemic to Peru.
