= Diplostephium espinosae =

Conservation status
- Near Threatened (IUCN 3.1)

Scientific classification
- Kingdom: Plantae
- Clade: Tracheophytes
- Clade: Angiosperms
- Clade: Eudicots
- Clade: Asterids
- Order: Asterales
- Family: Asteraceae
- Genus: Diplostephium
- Species: D. espinosae

Binomial name
- Diplostephium espinosae Cuatrec.

Species of flowering plant

Diplostephium espinosae is a species of flowering plant in the family Asteraceae. It is found only in Ecuador. Its natural habitats are subtropical or tropical moist montane forests, and subtropical or tropical high-altitude shrubland. It is threatened by habitat loss.
