= Lioptilodes antarcticus =

Scientific classification
- Kingdom: Animalia
- Phylum: Arthropoda
- Clade: Pancrustacea
- Class: Insecta
- Order: Lepidoptera
- Family: Pterophoridae
- Genus: Lioptilodes
- Species: L. antarcticus

Binomial name
- Lioptilodes antarcticus Staudinger, 1899

Species of plume moth

Lioptilodes antarcticus is a species of moth in the genus Lioptilodes known from Argentina and Chile. Moths of this species take flight in May, October, December and January, and have a wingspan of 20–21 millimetres. The host plant is a species of Adesmia.
