= Lioptilodes prometopa =

Scientific classification
- Kingdom: Animalia
- Phylum: Arthropoda
- Clade: Pancrustacea
- Class: Insecta
- Order: Lepidoptera
- Family: Pterophoridae
- Genus: Lioptilodes
- Species: L. prometopa

Binomial name
- Lioptilodes prometopa Meyrick, 1909

Species of plume moth

Lioptilodes prometopa is a species of moth belonging to the genus Lioptilodes and is found in Peru. Moths of this species take flight in May, June and December and have a wingspan of approximately 27–30 millimetres (1.1–1.2 in).
