= Postplatyptilia aestuosa =

Scientific classification
- Kingdom: Animalia
- Phylum: Arthropoda
- Class: Insecta
- Order: Lepidoptera
- Family: Pterophoridae
- Genus: Postplatyptilia
- Species: P. aestuosa

Binomial name
- Postplatyptilia aestuosa (Meyrick, 1916)

Synonyms
- Platyptilia aestuosa Meyrick, 1916

Species of plume moth

Postplatyptilia aestuosa is a moth of the family Pterophoridae. It is known from Argentina, Bolivia, Chile, Ecuador and Peru.

The wingspan is 17–21 mm. Adults are on wing from August to October.

The larvae feed on Oxalis tuberosa.
