= Leptodeuterocopus neales =

Scientific classification
- Domain: Eukaryota
- Kingdom: Animalia
- Phylum: Arthropoda
- Class: Insecta
- Order: Lepidoptera
- Family: Pterophoridae
- Genus: Leptodeuterocopus
- Species: L. neales

Binomial name
- Leptodeuterocopus neales (Walsingham, 1915)

Synonyms
- Oxyptilus neales Walsingham, 1915; Oxyptilus maleficus Meyrick, 1926

Species of plume moth

Leptodeuterocopus neales is a moth of the family Pterophoridae that is known from Costa Rica, Ecuador, Guatemala, Mexico, Suriname, Paraguay, Peru and Venezuela. It has recently been recorded from Florida.

The wingspan is about 13 millimetres (0.51 in). Adults are on wing in April, May, August, September, October, November and December.
