= Postplatyptilia fuscicornis =

Scientific classification
- Kingdom: Animalia
- Phylum: Arthropoda
- Clade: Pancrustacea
- Class: Insecta
- Order: Lepidoptera
- Family: Pterophoridae
- Genus: Postplatyptilia
- Species: P. fuscicornis

Binomial name
- Postplatyptilia fuscicornis (Zeller, 1877)

Synonyms
- Platyptilia fuscicornis Zeller, 1877

Species of plume moth

Postplatyptilia fuscicornis is a moth of the family Pterophoridae. It is known from Brazil, Chile, Colombia, Ecuador and Uruguay.

The wingspan is 15–17 mm (0.59–0.67 in). Adults are on wing in February.
