= Postplatyptilia genisei =

Scientific classification
- Kingdom: Animalia
- Phylum: Arthropoda
- Class: Insecta
- Order: Lepidoptera
- Family: Pterophoridae
- Genus: Postplatyptilia
- Species: P. genisei

Binomial name
- Postplatyptilia genisei (Pastrana, 1989)

Synonyms
- Stenoptilia genisei Pastrana, 1989

Species of plume moth

Postplatyptilia genisei is a moth of the family Pterophoridae described by Pastrana in 1989. It is known from Argentina.

The wingspan is 19–21 mm. Adults are on wing in December, January, March and May.
