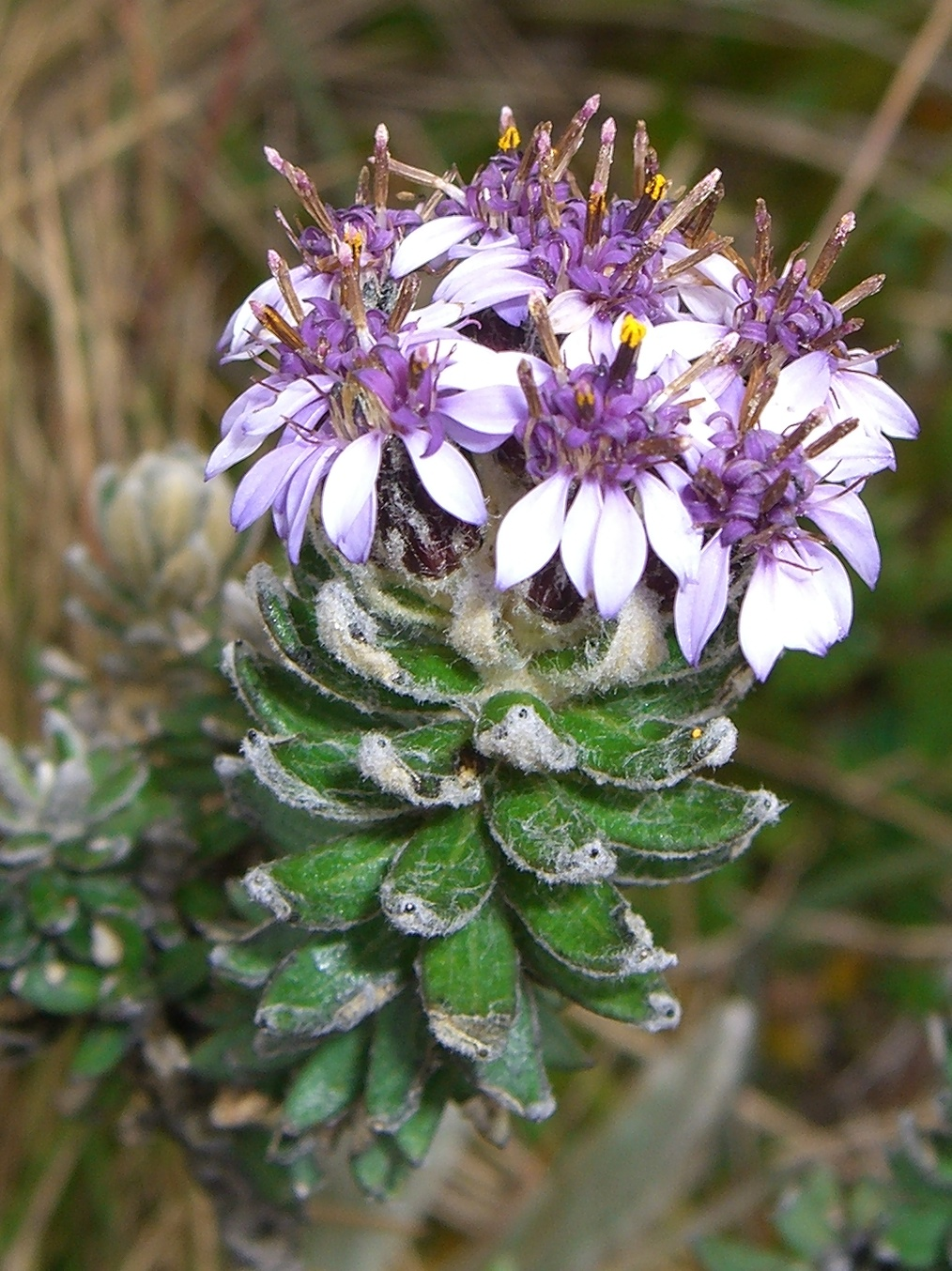
- Diplostephium phylicoides

Scientific classification
- Kingdom: Plantae
- Clade: Tracheophytes
- Clade: Angiosperms
- Clade: Eudicots
- Clade: Asterids
- Order: Asterales
- Family: Asteraceae
- Subfamily: Asteroideae
- Tribe: Astereae
- Subtribe: Baccharidinae
- Genus: Diplostephium; Kunth

Type species
- Diplostephium lavandulifolium Kunth

Synonyms
- Simblocline DC.; Linochilus Benth.; Piofontia Cuatrec.

= Diplostephium =

Genus of flowering plants

Diplostephium is a genus of trees and shrubs in the family Asteraceae.

Diplostephium is distributed on high mountains zones from Venezuela to Chile with the exception of two species in Costa Rica (INBio information system, July 2005) and twelve in the "Sierra Nevada de Santa Marta" (Colombia). It makes part of the high andean forest and the paramo ecosystems. Colombia has the most species with 63 (Vargas & Madriñán, 2006), the majority of them found in the Oriental Cordillera, which has 33 registered species until this moment. Diplostephium is the third most diverse genus on the paramos with 70 species after Pentacalia and Senecio (Luteyn, 1999).

According to José Cuatrecasas, (1986) the genus is an element of Neotropical origin that could have reached the paramos from the southern latitudes of South America; where the primitive arboreal species can be found in the high Andean forest while the most advanced members can be found in the paramos and super-paramos. This reinforces previous theories from Cuatrecasas (1969), who proposed as atavistic characteristics the morphologies present in the arboreal species of high Andean forest. Based on this, Cuatrecasas made a phylogenetic ordination into natural groups or series where the derived species are more diverse and are found at high altitudes.

Species accepted by the Plants of the World Online as of December 2022:

- Diplostephium abietinum S.F.Blake
- Diplostephium affine Wedd.
- Diplostephium antisanense Hieron.
- Diplostephium asplundii Cuatrec.
- Diplostephium azureum Cuatrec.
- Diplostephium barclayanum Cuatrec.
- Diplostephium cajamarquillense Cuatrec.
- Diplostephium callaense Cuatrec.
- Diplostephium callilepis S.F.Blake
- Diplostephium carabayense Wedd.
- Diplostephium cinereum Cuatrec.
- Diplostephium crypteriophyllum Cuatrec.
- Diplostephium dentatum Cuatrec.
- Diplostephium empetrifolium S.F.Blake
- Diplostephium ericoides (Lam.) Cabrera
- Diplostephium espinosae Cuatrec.
- Diplostephium fernandez-alonsoi S.Díaz
- Diplostephium flavidum V.M.Badillo
- Diplostephium foliosissimum S.F.Blake
- Diplostephium friedbergii Cuatrec.
- Diplostephium glandulosum Hieron.
- Diplostephium gnidioides S.F.Blake
- Diplostephium goodspeedii Cuatrec.
- Diplostephium gynoxyoides Cuatrec.
- Diplostephium haenkei Wedd.
- Diplostephium hartwegii Hieron.
- Diplostephium hippophae S.F.Blake
- Diplostephium incanum Hieron.
- Diplostephium jelskii Hieron.
- Diplostephium juniperinum Cuatrec.
- Diplostephium konotrichum Cuatrec.
- Diplostephium lanatum Cuatrec.
- Diplostephium lechleri Wedd.
- Diplostephium leucactinum Cuatrec.
- Diplostephium macrocephalum S.F.Blake
- Diplostephium meyenii Wedd.
- Diplostephium oblanceolatum S.F.Blake
- Diplostephium oxapampanum Cuatrec.
- Diplostephium pachyphyllum Cuatrec.
- Diplostephium pearcei Sprague & S.F.Blake
- Diplostephium peruvianum Cuatrec.
- Diplostephium pulchrum S.F.Blake
- Diplostephium ramiglabrum Cuatrec.
- Diplostephium sagasteguii Cuatrec.
- Diplostephium sandiense Cuatrec.
- Diplostephium serratifolium Cuatrec.
- Diplostephium spinulosum Wedd.
- Diplostephium stuebelii (Hieron.) Cuatrec.
- Diplostephium tacorense Hieron.
- Diplostephium tolimense Cuatrec.
- Diplostephium vaccinioides S.F.Blake
- Diplostephium vermiculatum Cuatrec.
- Diplostephium weberbaueri Cuatrec.
- Diplostephium wurdackii Cuatrec.
- Diplostephium yahuarcochense Cuatrec.
