= Leptodeuterocopus fortunatus =

Scientific classification
- Kingdom: Animalia
- Phylum: Arthropoda
- Class: Insecta
- Order: Lepidoptera
- Family: Pterophoridae
- Genus: Leptodeuterocopus
- Species: L. fortunatus

Binomial name
- Leptodeuterocopus fortunatus (Meyrick, 1921)

Synonyms
- Deuterocopus fortunatus Meyrick, 1921

Species of plume moth

Leptodeuterocopus fortunatus is a moth of the family Pterophoridae that is known from Brazil.

== Description ==
The wingspan is about 12 millimetres (0.47 in). Adults are on wing in December.
