= Leptodeuterocopus citrogaster =

Scientific classification
- Domain: Eukaryota
- Kingdom: Animalia
- Phylum: Arthropoda
- Class: Insecta
- Order: Lepidoptera
- Family: Pterophoridae
- Genus: Leptodeuterocopus
- Species: L. citrogaster

Binomial name
- Leptodeuterocopus citrogaster T. B. Fletcher, 1910

Synonyms
- Deuterocopus citrogaster

Species of plume moth

Leptodeuterocopus citrogaster is a moth of the family Pterophoridae. It was described by Thomas Bainbrigge Fletcher in 1910 and is known from the Moluccas. It is the type species of the genus Leptodeuterocopus.
