= Postplatyptilia paraglyptis =

Scientific classification
- Kingdom: Animalia
- Phylum: Arthropoda
- Clade: Pancrustacea
- Class: Insecta
- Order: Lepidoptera
- Family: Pterophoridae
- Genus: Postplatyptilia
- Species: P. paraglyptis

Binomial name
- Postplatyptilia paraglyptis (Meyrick, 1908)

Synonyms
- Platyptilia paraglyptis Meyrick, 1908

Species of plume moth

Postplatyptilia paraglyptis is a moth of the family Pterophoridae. It is known from Argentina.

The wingspan is about 14 mm.
