= Leptodeuterocopus hipparchus =

Scientific classification
- Kingdom: Animalia
- Phylum: Arthropoda
- Class: Insecta
- Order: Lepidoptera
- Family: Pterophoridae
- Genus: Leptodeuterocopus
- Species: L. hipparchus

Binomial name
- Leptodeuterocopus hipparchus (Meyrick, 1921)

Synonyms
- Deuterocopus hipparchus Meyrick, 1921

Species of plume moth

Leptodeuterocopus hipparchus is a moth of the family Pterophoridae that is known from Brazil and Venezuela.

The wingspan is 11–14 millimetres (0.43–0.55 in). Adults are on wing in June and October.
