= Lioptilodes tribonia =

Scientific classification
- Kingdom: Animalia
- Phylum: Arthropoda
- Clade: Pancrustacea
- Class: Insecta
- Order: Lepidoptera
- Family: Pterophoridae
- Genus: Lioptilodes
- Species: L. tribonia

Binomial name
- Lioptilodes tribonia Meyrick, 1921

Synonyms
- Stenoptilia tribonia (Meyrick, 1921)

Species of plume moth

Lioptilodes tribonia is a species of moth in the genus Lioptilodes known from Chile and Peru. Moths of this species take flight in January and July and have a wingspan of approximately 15–16 millimetres.
