= Diplostephium ramiglabrum =

Conservation status
- Endangered (IUCN 3.1)

Scientific classification
- Kingdom: Plantae
- Clade: Tracheophytes
- Clade: Angiosperms
- Clade: Eudicots
- Clade: Asterids
- Order: Asterales
- Family: Asteraceae
- Genus: Diplostephium
- Species: D. ramiglabrum

Binomial name
- Diplostephium ramiglabrum Cuatrec.

Species of flowering plant

Diplostephium ramiglabrum is a species of flowering plant in the family Asteraceae. It is found only in Ecuador at an elevation range of 2,500–3,000 metres (8,200–9,800 ft). Its natural habitat is subtropical or tropical moist montane forests. It is threatened by habitat loss.
