= Leptodeuterocopus sochchoroides =

Scientific classification
- Kingdom: Animalia
- Phylum: Arthropoda
- Class: Insecta
- Order: Lepidoptera
- Family: Pterophoridae
- Genus: Leptodeuterocopus
- Species: L. sochchoroides

Binomial name
- Leptodeuterocopus sochchoroides T. B. Fletcher, 1910

Species of plume moth

Leptodeuterocopus sochchoroides is a moth of the family Pterophoridae that is known from Brazil.

The wingspan is 12–14 millimetres (0.47–0.55 in). Adults are on wing in June.
