= Lioptilodes =

Scientific classification
- Kingdom: Animalia
- Phylum: Arthropoda
- Class: Insecta
- Order: Lepidoptera
- Family: Pterophoridae
- Subfamily: Pterophorinae
- Tribe: Platyptiliini
- Genus: Lioptilodes; Zimmerman, 1958

Plume moth genus

Lioptilodes is a genus of moths in the family Pterophoridae described by Zimmerman in 1958.

== Species ==
- Lioptilodes aguilaicus
- Lioptilodes albistriolatus
- Lioptilodes alolepidodactylus
- Lioptilodes altivolans
- Lioptilodes antarcticus
- Lioptilodes arequipa
- Lioptilodes brasilicus
- Lioptilodes cocodrilo
- Lioptilodes cuzcoicus
- Lioptilodes doeri
- Lioptilodes fetisi
- Lioptilodes friasi
- Lioptilodes limbani
- Lioptilodes neuquenicus
- Lioptilodes ockendeni
- Lioptilodes parafuscicostatus
- Lioptilodes prometopa
- Lioptilodes rionegroicus
- Lioptilodes salarius
- Lioptilodes subantarcticus
- Lioptilodes testaceus
- Lioptilodes topali
- Lioptilodes tribonia
- Lioptilodes yungas
- Lioptilodes zapalaicus
