= Postplatyptilia saeva =

Scientific classification
- Kingdom: Animalia
- Phylum: Arthropoda
- Class: Insecta
- Order: Lepidoptera
- Family: Pterophoridae
- Genus: Postplatyptilia
- Species: P. saeva

Binomial name
- Postplatyptilia saeva (Meyrick, 1930)

Synonyms
- Platyptilia saeva Meyrick, 1930

Species of plume moth

Postplatyptilia saeva is a moth of the family Pterophoridae. It is known from Ecuador, Peru and Venezuela.

The wingspan is 16–18 mm. Adults are on wing in January, February, April, July and October.
