= Diplostephium crypteriophyllum =

Conservation status
- Endangered (IUCN 3.1)

Scientific classification
- Kingdom: Plantae
- Clade: Tracheophytes
- Clade: Angiosperms
- Clade: Eudicots
- Clade: Asterids
- Order: Asterales
- Family: Asteraceae
- Genus: Diplostephium
- Species: D. crypteriophyllum

Binomial name
- Diplostephium crypteriophyllum Cuatrec.

Species of flowering plant

Diplostephium crypteriophyllum is a species of flowering plant in the family Asteraceae. It is found only in Ecuador. Its natural habitat is subtropical or tropical high-elevation shrubland. It is threatened by habitat loss.
