= Leptodeuterocopus zonites =

Scientific classification
- Kingdom: Animalia
- Phylum: Arthropoda
- Class: Insecta
- Order: Lepidoptera
- Family: Pterophoridae
- Genus: Leptodeuterocopus
- Species: L. zonites

Binomial name
- Leptodeuterocopus zonites (Meyrick, 1913)

Synonyms
- Oxyptilus zonites Meyrick, 1913

Species of plume moth

Leptodeuterocopus zonites is a moth of the family Pterophoridae that is known from British Guyana.

The wingspan is about 12 millimetres (0.47 in). Adults are on wing in January and February.
