= Leptodeuterocopus =

Scientific classification
- Kingdom: Animalia
- Phylum: Arthropoda
- Class: Insecta
- Order: Lepidoptera
- Family: Pterophoridae
- Genus: Leptodeuterocopus; Fletcher, 1910

Plume moth genus

Leptodeuterocopus is a genus of moths in the family Pterophoridae. It was erected in 1910 by Thomas Bainbrigge Fletcher, and has Leptodeuterocopus citrogaster as type species. Several of its species were originally described in genera Deuterocopus or Oxyptilus.

== Species ==
As of version 1.1.23.125, the Catalogue of the Pterophoroidea of the World lists the following species for genus Leptodeuterocopus:

- Leptodeuterocopus angulatus Gielis, 2006
- Leptodeuterocopus citrogaster T. B. Fletcher, 1910
- Leptodeuterocopus duchicela Gielis, 2006
- Leptodeuterocopus exquisitus (Meyrick, 1921)
- Leptodeuterocopus fortunatus (Meyrick, 1921)
- Leptodeuterocopus gratus (Meyrick, 1921)
- Leptodeuterocopus hipparchus (Meyrick, 1921)
- Leptodeuterocopus neales (Walsingham, 1915)
- Leptodeuterocopus panamaensis Gielis, 2006
- Leptodeuterocopus sochchoroides T. B. Fletcher, 1910
- Leptodeuterocopus sorongensis Gielis & de Vos, 2007
- Leptodeuterocopus trinidad Gielis, 1996
- Leptodeuterocopus tungurahue Gielis, 2006
- Leptodeuterocopus zonites (Meyrick, 1913)
