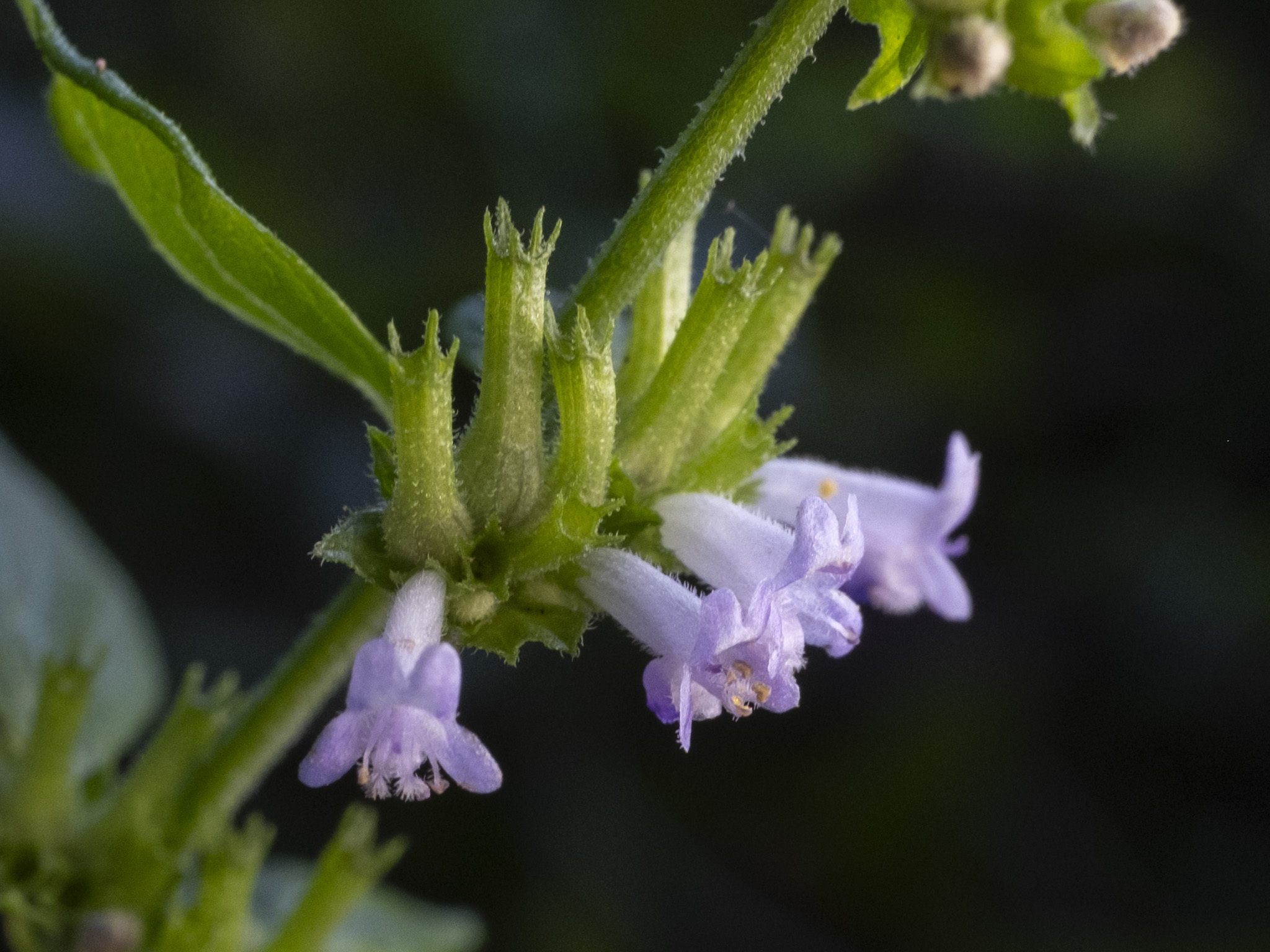

Scientific classification
- Kingdom: Plantae
- Clade: Tracheophytes
- Clade: Angiosperms
- Clade: Eudicots
- Clade: Asterids
- Order: Lamiales
- Family: Lamiaceae
- Genus: Cantinoa
- Species: C. mutabilis

Binomial name
- Cantinoa mutabilis (Rich.) Harley & J.F.B.Pastore

= Cantinoa mutabilis =

Species of plant

Cantinoa mutabilis is a species of flowering plant in the mint family (Lamiaceae). It is native to tropical and subtropical regions of the Americas, where it occurs in a range of moist and seasonally dry habitats. The species has a complex taxonomic history and has been treated under different genera, most notably Hyptis and Cantinoa, reflecting differing interpretations of relationships within the tribe Hyptidinae.

== Taxonomy and nomenclature ==
The species was first described in 1792 by Louis Claude Marie Richard in the genus Nepeta as Nepeta mutabilis.

It was later transferred to the genus Hyptis as Hyptis mutabilis (Rich.) Briq., a name that was widely used throughout the 19th and 20th centuries in floristic and taxonomic literature.

In a comprehensive revision of New World members of the tribe Hyptidinae, Harley and Pastore (2012) segregated several lineages from Hyptis and placed this species in the genus Cantinoa, publishing the combination Cantinoa mutabilis.

While many contemporary taxonomic authorities, including Plants of the World Online, accept Cantinoa mutabilis as the correct name, some databases and regional treatments continue to list the species under Hyptis, reflecting ongoing differences in generic circumscription within the group.

== Description ==
Cantinoa mutabilis is an aromatic herb or subshrub with opposite leaves and square stems, characteristic of the Lamiaceae. The flowers are bilaterally symmetrical and borne in axillary clusters, with a tubular corolla adapted for insect pollination. Morphological characters used to distinguish the species from related taxa include features of the inflorescence, calyx, and corolla, which have been emphasized in modern taxonomic treatments.

== Distribution and habitat ==
The species is native to tropical and subtropical regions of the Americas, including parts of Central America, the Caribbean, and South America. It occurs in a variety of habitats, often in open or disturbed sites, forest margins, and seasonally dry environments. In some areas outside its core native range, it has been recorded as an introduced species.

== See also ==
- List of Lamiaceae of South Africa
