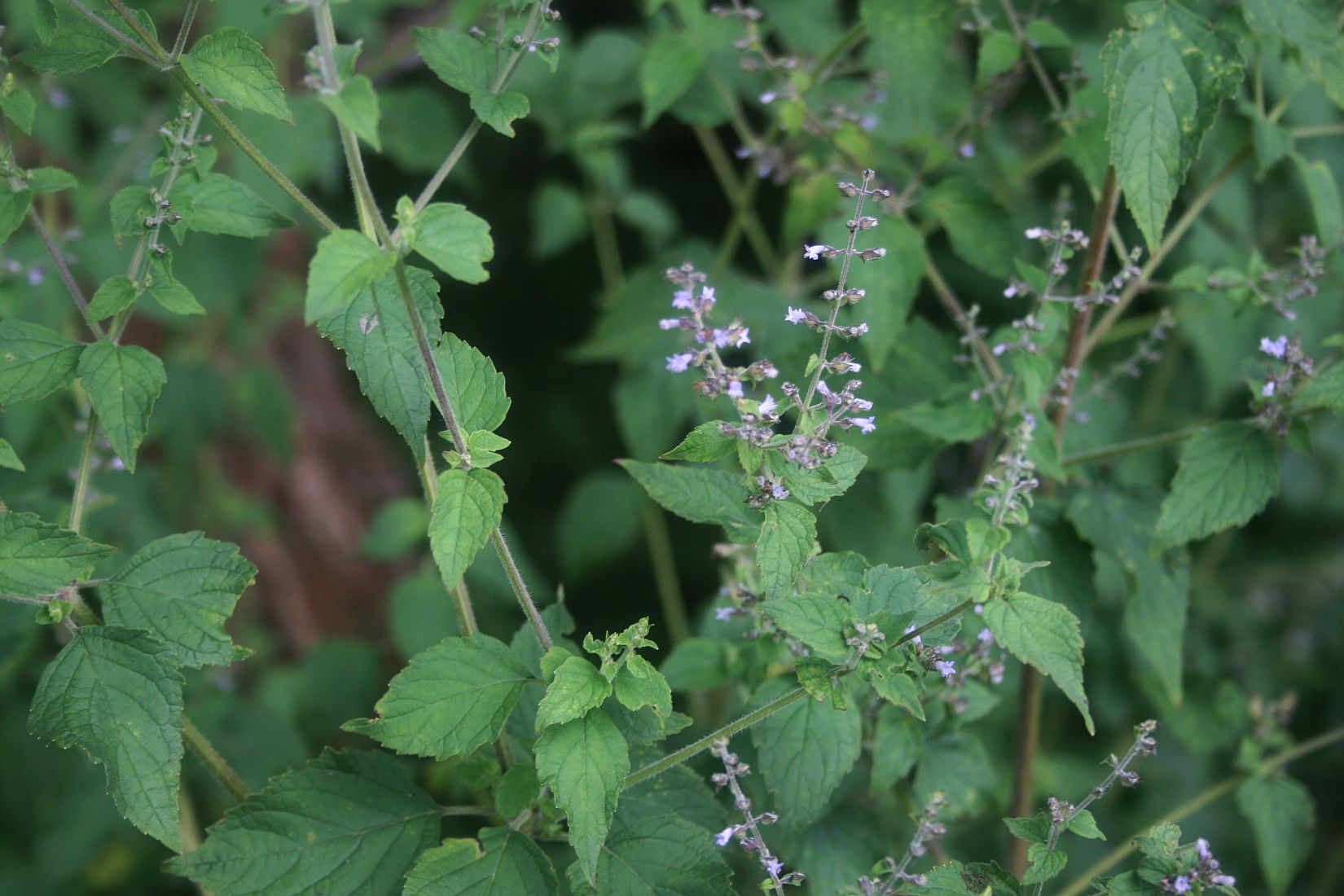
- Cantinoa mutabilis (formerly Hyptis mutabilis)

Scientific classification
- Kingdom: Plantae
- Clade: Embryophytes
- Clade: Tracheophytes
- Clade: Spermatophytes
- Clade: Angiosperms
- Clade: Eudicots
- Clade: Asterids
- Order: Lamiales
- Family: Lamiaceae
- Subfamily: Nepetoideae
- Tribe: Ocimeae
- Genus: Cantinoa; Harley & J.F.B.Pastore

= Cantinoa =

Genus of flowering plants

Cantinoa is a genus of flowering plants in the family Lamiaceae. It is native primarily to New World, with some species introduced in the old world.

The endemic range of this genus is Tropical and Subtropical America. It is found in Argentina, Belize, Bolivia, Brazil, Colombia, Costa Rica, Cuba, Dominican Republic, Ecuador, El Salvador, Florida, French Guiana, Galápagos, Guatemala, Guyana, Haiti, Honduras, Jamaica, the Leeward Islands, Mexico, Nicaragua, Panama, Paraguay, Peru, Puerto Rico, Suriname, Trinidad, Tobago, Uruguay, Venezuela and the Windward Islands.

It was first described and published by Raymond Mervyn Harley and José Floriano Barêa Pastore in Phytotaxa vol.58 on page 8 in 2012.

The genus name of Cantinoa is in honour of Philip D. Cantino (or Philip Douglas Cantino) (b. 1948), who is an American botanist at Ohio University. He specialised in Lamiaceae plants.

The genus is not recognized by the United States Department of Agriculture and the Agricultural Research Service, they class it as a possible synonym of Hyptis Jacq.

== Species ==
As accepted by Kew;

- Cantinoa althaifolia (Pohl ex Benth.) Harley & J.F.B.Pastore
- Cantinoa americana (Aubl.) Harley & J.F.B.Pastore
- Cantinoa carpinifolia (Benth.) Harley & J.F.B.Pastore
- Cantinoa colombiana (Epling) Harley & J.F.B.Pastore
- Cantinoa dubia (Pohl ex Benth.) Harley & J.F.B.Pastore
- Cantinoa duplicatodentata (Pohl ex Benth.) Harley & J.F.B.Pastore
- Cantinoa erythrostachys (Epling) Harley & J.F.B.Pastore
- Cantinoa heterodon (Epling) Harley & J.F.B.Pastore
- Cantinoa impar (Epling) Harley & J.F.B.Pastore
- Cantinoa indivisa (Pilg.) Harley & J.F.B.Pastore
- Cantinoa macroptera (Briq.) Harley & J.F.B.Pastore
- Cantinoa multiseta (Benth.) Harley & J.F.B.Pastore
- Cantinoa muricata (Schott ex Benth.) Harley & J.F.B.Pastore
- Cantinoa mutabilis (Rich.) Harley & J.F.B.Pastore
- Cantinoa nanuzae Harley
- Cantinoa x obvallata (Benth.) Harley & J.F.B.Pastore
- Cantinoa pinetorum (Epling) Harley & J.F.B.Pastore
- Cantinoa plectranthoides (Benth.) Harley & J.F.B.Pastore
- Cantinoa propinqua (Epling) Harley & J.F.B.Pastore
- Cantinoa racemulosa (Mart. ex Benth.) Harley & J.F.B.Pastore
- Cantinoa rubicunda (Pohl ex Benth.) Harley & J.F.B.Pastore
- Cantinoa similis (Epling) Harley & J.F.B.Pastore
- Cantinoa stricta (Benth.) Harley & J.F.B.Pastore
- Cantinoa subrotunda (Pohl ex Benth.) Harley & J.F.B.Pastore
- Cantinoa x sylvularum (A.St.-Hil. ex Benth.) Harley & J.F.B.Pastore
- Cantinoa villicaulis (Epling) Harley & J.F.B.Pastore
- Cantinoa violacea (Pohl ex Benth.) Harley & J.F.B.Pastore
