= Cees Gielis =

Dutch entomologist

Cees Gielis is a Dutch entomologist and researcher of biodiversity, specializing in Lepidoptera, at the Naturalis Biodiversity Center in Leiden, Netherlands. As of March 2019, Gielis authored 378 taxa within the family of Pterophoridae and 19 within the family of Alucitidae.
