= List of Hieracium species =

The genus Hieracium, hawkweeds, is a very large genus of flowering plants in the sunflower family (Asteraceae). As of October 2026, Plants of the World Online has accepted 4,614 species.

== A ==
- Hieracium abbrevians Brenner
- Hieracium abellense Mateo & Alejandre
- Hieracium abiegni Johanss. & Sam.
- Hieracium abietopsis Gottschl. & Dunkel
- Hieracium abradenium Brenner
- Hieracium abrupticuspis Folin
- Hieracium abruptorum Schljakov
- Hieracium abscissum Less.
- Hieracium acalephoides Arv.-Touv. & Gaut.
- Hieracium acamptum P.D.Sell & C.West
- Hieracium accrescens Hyl.
- Hieracium acebedoanum Mateo, Egido & Gómiz
- Hieracium acelidodes Omang
- Hieracium acervatum Norrl.
- Hieracium achalense Sleumer
- Hieracium achnoum Omang
- Hieracium achrostum Omang
- Hieracium acidodontum Dahlst. ex Johanss.
- Hieracium acidolepis T.Tyler
- Hieracium acidophorum Omang
- Hieracium acidophyllum Ósk.
- Hieracium acidotoides (Dahlst.) Dahlst.
- Hieracium acidotum Dahlst.
- Hieracium acinacifolium Schljakov
- Hieracium acmaeophyton Omang
- Hieracium acocotum Omang
- Hieracium acosmodontum Elfstr.
- Hieracium acrifoliiforme Johanss.
- Hieracium acriserratum Ohlsén
- Hieracium acrobaptum Dahlst. ex Notø
- Hieracium acrobeles Dahlst. ex Notø
- Hieracium acrocaustum Omang
- Hieracium acrochristum Dahlst. ex Johanss.
- Hieracium acrogymnon (Malme) Dahlst.
- Hieracium acrolepis Brenner
- Hieracium acroleucoides Dahlst.
- Hieracium acroleucum Stenstr. ex Dahlst.
- Hieracium acromadarum Sam.
- Hieracium acromaurum (Dahlst. ex Zahn) Johanss.
- Hieracium acroscepes (Omang) Omang
- Hieracium acudentulum Omang
- Hieracium acuens Johanss.
- Hieracium aculeidens Omang
- Hieracium acuminatifolium (Litv. & Zahn) Üksip
- Hieracium acutellum (Zahn) Johanss.
- Hieracium acutissimum Dahlst.
- Hieracium acutiussimoides Notø
- Hieracium acuum Elfstr. ex Omang
- Hieracium adakense Schljakov
- Hieracium adampliatum (Dahlst.) Dahlst.
- Hieracium adarnelli Notø
- Hieracium adcopholepium Notø
- Hieracium adelum Üksip
- Hieracium adeneilema Brenner
- Hieracium adeneimon Omang
- Hieracium adenerephes Omang
- Hieracium adeniscodes Omang
- Hieracium adenocardoanum Mateo, L.Sáez, Egido & Gómiz
- Hieracium adenocaulon Norrl.
- Hieracium adenocephalum (Sch.Bip.) Arv.-Touv.
- Hieracium adenoceps Wiinst.
- Hieracium adenochaetum Zahn
- Hieracium adenocomum Sleumer
- Hieracium adenodermum Zahn
- Hieracium adenodivaricatum Mateo, Egido & Gómiz
- Hieracium adenodontum Arv.-Touv. & Gaut.
- Hieracium adenolegionense Mateo & Egido
- Hieracium adenolepium Dahlst. ex Notø
- Hieracium adenopalantianum Mateo
- Hieracium adenophlomoides Mateo
- Hieracium adenophorum Scheele
- Hieracium adenophyton Zahn
- Hieracium adenopsilon Dahlst.
- Hieracium adenothales Omang
- Hieracium adenotrichum Brenner
- Hieracium adenotrophum Omang
- Hieracium adetoides Omang
- Hieracium adhalsicum Notø
- Hieracium adindutiforme Notø
- Hieracium adipatum Notø
- Hieracium adiposum (Dahlst.) Johanss.
- Hieracium adlasiocybe Notø
- Hieracium adlerzii Almq. ex F.Hanb.
- Hieracium adpressum Norrl.
- Hieracium adraenicum Mateo
- Hieracium adsistens Brenner
- Hieracium adspersum (Norrl.) Dahlst.
- Hieracium adunantidens Schljakov
- Hieracium adveniens Malmio
- Hieracium adventicium Ohlsén
- Hieracium aegialobates Omang
- Hieracium aegrotans Omang
- Hieracium aemilianense Mateo & Egido
- Hieracium aemulans Hyl.
- Hieracium aemuliforme (Zahn) Mateo
- Hieracium aemulum Arv.-Touv. & Gaut.
- Hieracium aeolocephalum Omang
- Hieracium aeolochroum Omang
- Hieracium aeololepis Omang
- Hieracium aepolonchum Johanss.
- Hieracium aepymetes Omang
- Hieracium aequalifolium Wiinst.
- Hieracium aequialtum Hyl.
- Hieracium aequiflorum Brenner
- Hieracium aequifolium Brenner
- Hieracium aequilibratum Omang
- Hieracium aequilingua Brenner
- Hieracium aequioridens Omang
- Hieracium aequiparabile Norrl.
- Hieracium aequipodum Notø
- Hieracium aequiserratum P.D.Sell
- Hieracium aesculifolium Mateo, Egido & Alejandre
- Hieracium aestivum Fr.
- Hieracium aethalodes Hyl.
- Hieracium aethaloteles Omang
- Hieracium aethiadenium Dahlst.
- Hieracium aethocranum Dahlst.
- Hieracium aethotrichum Dahlst. ex Johanss.
- Hieracium aetnense (Gottschl., Raimondo & Di Grist.) C.Brullo & Brullo
- Hieracium agastophyes Ósk.
- Hieracium ageneium Hyl.
- Hieracium aggregatifolium P.D.Sell
- Hieracium aggregatum Backh.f.
- Hieracium aglense Note
- Hieracium agronesaeum Üksip
- Hieracium aguilari Pau
- Hieracium aguilellae Mateo
- Hieracium ahlfvengrenii Dahlst.
- Hieracium aiguafredanum Mateo, Egido & Gómiz
- Hieracium aipolium Norrl.
- Hieracium ajmasianum (Pau & Font Quer) Dobignard
- Hieracium akjaurense Norrl.
- Hieracium alapodum Notø
- Hieracium alatipes Wiinst.
- Hieracium alatum Lapeyr.
- Hieracium albacetum Arv.-Touv.
- Hieracium albanicum Freyn
- Hieracium albatipes Dahlst. ex Johanss.
- Hieracium albertii Schljakov
- Hieracium albiduliforme Johanss.
- Hieracium albidulum Stenstr. ex T.Durand & B.D.Jacks.
- Hieracium albiflorum Hook.
- Hieracium albinotum Dahlst. ex Johanss.
- Hieracium albocostatum (Norrl.) Üksip
- Hieracium albomurorum Mateo & Egido
- Hieracium albosignatum Omang
- Hieracium albotomentosum Brenner
- Hieracium albovarium Dahlst.
- Hieracium albovittatum Dahlst. ex Johanss.
- Hieracium albovittoides Notø
- Hieracium alces T.Tyler
- Hieracium aleiatolepium Dahlst.
- Hieracium alejandrei Mateo
- Hieracium alfitodes Omang
- Hieracium alflotense Omang
- Hieracium alinyense Mateo, Egido & Gómiz
- Hieracium alipes Johanss. & Sam.
- Hieracium alliicolor Johanss.
- Hieracium allophyllum Omang
- Hieracium allubescens Johanss.
- Hieracium alphostictum Dahlst.
- Hieracium alpinum L.
- Hieracium alsense Johanss.
- Hieracium altaneuense Mateo & Egido
- Hieracium alticaliceum Omang
- Hieracium altinozlui Yıld.
- Hieracium altioriceps Norrl.
- Hieracium altipes (H.Lindb. ex Zahn) Dahlst.
- Hieracium altipetens Omang
- Hieracium altisorianum Mateo
- Hieracium altocourelense Mateo & Gómiz
- Hieracium altum Wiinst.
- Hieracium alutifolium Notø
- Hieracium amathophilon Omang
- Hieracium amaurophylloides Notø
- Hieracium amaurostictum W.Scott & R.C.Palmer
- Hieracium ambigosum Johanss. & Sam.
- Hieracium amblycentrum Dahlst.
- Hieracium amblycranum Dahlst. ex Notø
- Hieracium amblycybe Omang
- Hieracium amblyglochin Sam.
- Hieracium amblygonium Dahlst. ex Johanss.
- Hieracium amblylobum Üksip
- Hieracium amblylopum Omang
- Hieracium amblyodontum Hyl.
- Hieracium amblyterodon Omang
- Hieracium amblyzostum Omang
- Hieracium ammobium P.D.Sell & C.West
- Hieracium amneum Omang
- Hieracium amnicola P.D.Sell
- Hieracium amnoocranum Johanss.
- Hieracium amoenanthes Nyár. & Zahn
- Hieracium amoeniflorum Johanss.
- Hieracium amoenifrons Johanss.
- Hieracium amoenoarduum Üksip
- Hieracium amphicentrum Johanss. & Sam.
- Hieracium amphichnoum Ósk.
- Hieracium amphileion (Pohle & Zahn) Üksip
- Hieracium amphisericophorum Zahn
- Hieracium amplexicaule L.
- Hieracium ampliatiforme P.D.Sell
- Hieracium ampliatum Ley
- Hieracium amplidens Folin
- Hieracium amplificatum Dahlst. ex Johanss.
- Hieracium amplifrons Elfstr. ex Omang
- Hieracium amplisissimum Folin
- Hieracium amydrostictum P.D.Sell
- Hieracium anaclastopodum Omang
- Hieracium anadromodes Omang
- Hieracium anantozum Omang
- Hieracium anatonum Dahlst.
- Hieracium ancarense Mateo
- Hieracium ancevii Szeląg
- Hieracium ancistrotum Omang
- Hieracium ancisum Johanss.
- Hieracium ancotum Omang
- Hieracium anderssonii T.Tyler
- Hieracium andrasovszkyi Zahn
- Hieracium andreanszkyanum F.Kováts
- Hieracium andurense Arv.-Touv.
- Hieracium anelctum Omang
- Hieracium anfracticeps Johanss.
- Hieracium anfractifolium Dahlst. ex Johanss.
- Hieracium anfractiforme E.S.Marshall
- Hieracium angermannicum Dahlst. ex Johanss.
- Hieracium anglicum Fr.
- Hieracium anglorum Pugsley
- Hieracium angricum (Johanss.) Johanss.
- Hieracium anguineiforme Dahlst. ex Omang
- Hieracium anguinum (W.R.Linton) Roffey
- Hieracium angulatifrons Folin
- Hieracium angulosum Johanss.
- Hieracium angustatiforme P.D.Sell & C.West
- Hieracium angustatum (Lindeb.) Lindeb.
- Hieracium angustevitreum Folin
- Hieracium angusticranum
- Hieracium angustidens Johanss. & Sam.
- Hieracium angustifrons Schljakov
- Hieracium angustilingua Norrl.
- Hieracium angustilobatum Schljakov
- Hieracium angustisquamatum Schljakov
- Hieracium angustisquamum (Pugsley) Pugsley
- Hieracium angustum Lindeb.
- Hieracium anisoches Omang
- Hieracium anisolepis Hyl.
- Hieracium anisolobum Johanss. & Sam.
- Hieracium anisotomum Johanss. & Sam.
- Hieracium annae-toutoniae Zahn
- Hieracium anochnoum Ósk.
- Hieracium anodon Brenner
- Hieracium anodontum Dahlst.
- Hieracium anomodon Ósk.
- Hieracium anozaleum Omang
- Hieracium antecursorum Schljakov
- Hieracium anthericodes Omang
- Hieracium anthochryseum Omang
- Hieracium antholzense Zahn
- Hieracium anthracinum Dahlst. ex Johanss.
- Hieracium anthracodes Omang
- Hieracium anthracostylum Hyl.
- Hieracium antrorsum T.E.Nilsson
- Hieracium antygophyllum Omang
- Hieracium aorense Norrl.
- Hieracium apachyglossum Ósk.
- Hieracium apargiiforme Elfstr.
- Hieracium aperissoides Omang
- Hieracium aphanum Üksip
- Hieracium apheles P.D.Sell
- Hieracium aphelophyllum Omang
- Hieracium aphelotum Omang
- Hieracium aphyllocaule Ósk.
- Hieracium aphyllopodioides F.N.Williams
- Hieracium aphyllopodum Vuk.
- Hieracium aphyllum Nägeli & Peter
- Hieracium apicicomum Omang
- Hieracium apicifolium Fagerstr.
- Hieracium apiculare Omang
- Hieracium apiculatidens P.D.Sell
- Hieracium apiculatum Tausch
- Hieracium apicum Johanss. & Sam.
- Hieracium apoloense Rusby
- Hieracium appendiculatum Hyl.
- Hieracium approximatum Jord.
- Hieracium apricans Norrl.
- Hieracium apricorum Wiesb. ex Dichtl
- Hieracium aquiliceps Dahlst.
- Hieracium aquiliforme (Dahlst.) Dahlst.
- Hieracium aquilum Norrl.
- Hieracium aquitectum Ósk.
- Hieracium araeocladum Hyl.
- Hieracium araeolepis Omang
- Hieracium araeopum Omang
- Hieracium aranoandurense Mateo, Egido & Gómiz
- Hieracium arctocerinthe Dahlst. ex Johanss.
- Hieracium arctogeton Üksip
- Hieracium arctomurmanicum Schljakov
- Hieracium arctophilum (Fr.) Liro
- Hieracium arcuaticuneatum Johanss. & Sam.
- Hieracium ardissonei Zahn
- Hieracium arduum Notø
- Hieracium arevacorum Mateo
- Hieracium argaeoloides Omang
- Hieracium argaeolum Omang
- Hieracium argentarium T.Tyler
- Hieracium argentatum (Pugsley) P.D.Sell
- Hieracium argenteum Fr.
- Hieracium argentiforme P.D.Sell
- Hieracium argentimontanum Johanss.
- Hieracium argentinense Zahn
- Hieracium argillosum Omang
- Hieracium argospathum Wiinst.
- Hieracium argothrix Nägeli & Peter
- Hieracium argozum Omang
- Hieracium arguisianum Mateo
- Hieracium arguteserratum Folin
- Hieracium argutifolium Pugsley
- Hieracium argutifrons Omang
- Hieracium argutissimum Omang
- Hieracium argutulum Johanss.
- Hieracium argutum Nutt.
- Hieracium argyreum Arv.-Touv. & Gaut.
- Hieracium argyrotrichum Freyn
- Hieracium ariglaucoides Notø
- Hieracium arilasiodes Omang
- Hieracium ariphilum Notø
- Hieracium ariprepes Omang
- Hieracium aristidens P.D.Sell
- Hieracium arizaletae Mateo
- Hieracium arlbergense
- Hieracium armadalense P.D.Sell
- Hieracium armerioides Arv.-Touv.
- Hieracium arnarfellense Ósk.
- Hieracium arnedianum Mateo & Alejandre
- Hieracium arnellii Dahlst.
- Hieracium arnoldii T.Tyler
- Hieracium arnsidense McCosh
- Hieracium arolae Murr
- Hieracium arpadianum Zahn
- Hieracium arragonense Scheele
- Hieracium arranense P.D.Sell
- Hieracium arrectipes Almq. ex Elfstr.
- Hieracium arrectulum Omang
- Hieracium arrogans Johanss.
- Hieracium arrosiforme Dahlst. ex Johanss. & Sam.
- Hieracium arrostocephalum Omang
- Hieracium arrosum (Stenstr.) Johanss. & Sam.
- Hieracium arvonense P.D.Sell
- Hieracium aryslynense (Zahn) Üksip
- Hieracium asbolocephalum Omang
- Hieracium asbolopithum Omang
- Hieracium ascendens Omang
- Hieracium ascendentidens P.D.Sell
- Hieracium asemum Johanss. & Sam.
- Hieracium asenovgradense Jasiewicz & Pawł.
- Hieracium asikkalense Norrl.
- Hieracium askii T.Tyler
- Hieracium asperellum Brenner
- Hieracium asperulum Freyn
- Hieracium asplundii Sleumer
- Hieracium aspratile Norrl.
- Hieracium aspromontanum Brullo, Scelsi & Spamp.
- Hieracium asteridiophyllum P.D.Sell & C.West
- Hieracium asteroloma Hyl.
- Hieracium astibes Üksip
- Hieracium astroadenium Sleumer
- Hieracium asturicum Pau
- Hieracium asymmetricum Schljakov
- Hieracium ataliceps Omang
- Hieracium atalum (Omang) Omang
- Hieracium atelodes Omang
- Hieracium atelodon (Omang) Omang
- Hieracium aterrimum Hyl.
- Hieracium athroadenioides Norrl.
- Hieracium athroadenium Norrl.
- Hieracium athroizon Omang
- Hieracium atratiforme Simonk.
- Hieracium atratulum Norrl.
- Hieracium atratum Fr.
- Hieracium atrellum (Zahn) Üksip
- Hieracium atrescens Dahlst. ex Notø
- Hieracium atribarbatum Brenner
- Hieracium atricapitatum Brenner
- Hieracium atriceps Wiinst.
- Hieracium atrichocephalum (Dahlst.) Dahlst.
- Hieracium atricholepium Ósk.
- Hieracium atrichopodum Dahlst.
- Hieracium atricollum Schljakov
- Hieracium atricolor Folin
- Hieracium atricomum Brenner
- Hieracium atriglandulosum Brenner
- Hieracium atriglomerosum Johanss. & Sam.
- Hieracium atrihaegerstroemii Notø
- Hieracium atriplicifolium Schljakov
- Hieracium atrocaeruleum Ohlsén
- Hieracium atrocalyx Gottschl.
- Hieracium atrocephalum Schmalh.
- Hieracium atrocomatum Elfstr.
- Hieracium atrocranum Notø
- Hieracium atrogilvum Dahlst. ex Omang
- Hieracium atrohyalinum Johanss.
- Hieracium atropictum Arv.-Touv. & Gaut.
- Hieracium attenboroughianum T.C.G.Rich
- Hieracium attenuatifolium P.D.Sell & C.West
- Hieracium attractum Arv.-Touv.
- Hieracium atyphum Omang
- Hieracium auratiflorum Pugsley
- Hieracium auratile Norrl.
- Hieracium aureiceps Norrl. ex Schljakov
- Hieracium aurelianum Mateo
- Hieracium aurense Zahn
- Hieracium aureum Dahlst.
- Hieracium auriflorum Johanss.
- Hieracium aurigerum Norrl.
- Hieracium austericeps Dahlst. ex Notø
- Hieracium australe Fr.
- Hieracium australius (Beeby) Pugsley
- Hieracium austriniforme Dahlst. ex Johanss.
- Hieracium austrinum Stenstr.
- Hieracium austroslavicum K.Malý & Zahn
- Hieracium austrotatricum Szeląg
- Hieracium austurgilense (Omang) Omang
- Hieracium automorphum Omang
- Hieracium autonomum Notø
- Hieracium avae Dahlst. ex Johanss.
- Hieracium avellense Mateo & Alejandre
- Hieracium avi-chodesii Mateo
- Hieracium avilae Kunth
- Hieracium axaticum Arv.-Touv. & Gaut.
- Hieracium axichnoiforme Omang
- Hieracium axichnoum Omang
- Hieracium axillifrons Ósk.
- Hieracium aymericianum Arv.-Touv.
- Hieracium azerbaijanense Lack

== B ==
- Hieracium babianum Mateo, Egido & Alejandre
- Hieracium backhousei F.Hanb.
- Hieracium badiicolor Ohlsén
- Hieracium baenitzianum Arv.-Touv.
- Hieracium bakerianum Pugsley
- Hieracium balbisianum Arv.-Touv. & Briq.
- Hieracium balearicum Arv.-Touv.
- Hieracium balnearicum Mateo, Egido & Gómiz
- Hieracium baltarganum Mateo, Egido & Gómiz
- Hieracium barasonense
- Hieracium barbareifolium (Lönnr. ex Dahlst.) Johanss.
- Hieracium barbatulum Brenner
- Hieracium barbelliceps Wiinst.
- Hieracium barbulatulum (Pohle & Zahn) Elfstr.
- Hieracium barduliense Mateo & Alejandre
- Hieracium bariegoi Mateo, Egido & Gómiz
- Hieracium baroniae Hyl.
- Hieracium barrelieri Gottschl., Raimondo, Greuter & Di Grist.
- Hieracium barrimum (Johanss.) Johanss.
- Hieracium barrioluciense Mateo, Egido & Gómiz
- Hieracium basalticola Pugsley
- Hieracium basicinereum Folin
- Hieracium basicrinum (Zahn) Roffey
- Hieracium basidecurrens Folin
- Hieracium basidenticeps Folin
- Hieracium basifalcatum Folin
- Hieracium basifloccum Jasiewicz & Pawł.
- Hieracium basigriseum Folin
- Hieracium basilacinium Folin
- Hieracium basilare Wiinst.
- Hieracium basilimbatum Hyl.
- Hieracium basinudum Omang
- Hieracium basipinnatum (Omang) Grontved
- Hieracium basiplethes Omang
- Hieracium basipterum Omang
- Hieracium basiserratum Johanss.
- Hieracium basispodium Omang
- Hieracium basiunguiculum Folin
- Hieracium basivinosum Folin
- Hieracium bastrerianum Zahn
- Hieracium bathycephalum Elfstr.
- Hieracium bathycranum Omang
- Hieracium bathycyliceum Omang
- Hieracium bathymallum Hyl.
- Hieracium bathyodon Dahlst.
- Hieracium beamanii B.L.Turner
- Hieracium beckianum Gremli
- Hieracium bectauatense Kupr.
- Hieracium bectauatensis Kupr.
- Hieracium beebyanum Pugsley
- Hieracium belogradcense T.Georgiev & Kitan.
- Hieracium belonodontum (Dahlst.) Omang
- Hieracium belsetanum Mateo
- Hieracium bembicophorum Hyl.
- Hieracium benhopense McCosh
- Hieracium benulum Magnusson. ex Elfstr.
- Hieracium benzianum Murr & Zahn
- Hieracium berganum Arv.-Touv.
- Hieracium bergsetense Omang
- Hieracium bergstroemii Sam.
- Hieracium bernardi Rouy
- Hieracium bertilssonii T.E.Nilsson
- Hieracium bertisceum Niketić
- Hieracium beschtaviciforme Üksip
- Hieracium bettyhillense P.D.Sell
- Hieracium betuletorum Johanss.
- Hieracium beudense Mateo, Egido & Gómiz
- Hieracium beyeri Zahn
- Hieracium bichloricolor (Ganesch. & Zahn) Üksip
- Hieracium bicknellianum Belli & Arv.-Touv.
- Hieracium bicolor Scheele
- Hieracium bicurvum Johanss.
- Hieracium bifidum Kit. ex Hornem.
- Hieracium bijugipes Dahlst. & Enander
- Hieracium bimanum Norrl.
- Hieracium binatifolium H.Lindb.
- Hieracium bipediforme Dahlst.
- Hieracium bipes Dahlst.
- Hieracium birameum Johanss. & Sam.
- Hieracium bjeluschae K.Malý & Zahn
- Hieracium blancii J.Serres
- Hieracium blekingense (Dahlst. & Svanlund) T.E.Nilsson
- Hieracium bocconei Griseb.
- Hieracium bogense Johanss.
- Hieracium bohatschianum Zahn
- Hieracium boixarense Pau
- Hieracium boixolense Mateo, Egido & Gómiz
- Hieracium bolanderi A.Gray
- Hieracium boliviense (Wedd.) Sch.Bip.
- Hieracium bombycinum Boiss. & Reut. ex Fr.
- Hieracium boratynskii Szeląg
- Hieracium borckae Ponert
- Hieracium borealiforme P.D.Sell & C.West
- Hieracium boreoanglicum P.D.Sell
- Hieracium boreoapenninum Gottschl.
- Hieracium boreum Elfstr.
- Hieracium borgundense Omang
- Hieracium bornetii Burnat & Gremli
- Hieracium borragineum Arv.-Touv. & Gaut.
- Hieracium borsanum Mráz
- Hieracium borzae Nyár. & Zahn
- Hieracium bosniacum Freyn
- Hieracium boswellii E.F.Linton
- Hieracium botniense Brenner
- Hieracium bourgaei Boiss.
- Hieracium bowlesianum Arv.-Touv. & Gaut.
- Hieracium boyumense Omang
- Hieracium brachycodon Hyl.
- Hieracium brachycybe Norrl.
- Hieracium brachyligulum Notø
- Hieracium brachymeres Dahlst. ex Notø
- Hieracium brachypodarium Dahlst.
- Hieracium brachysceles Omang
- Hieracium brachysoma Brenner
- Hieracium brachystylum Notø
- Hieracium brachythysanum Hyl.
- Hieracium bracteifolium Elfstr. ex Omang
- Hieracium bracteolatum Sm.
- Hieracium bracteosissimum Elfstr. ex Omang
- Hieracium bractolympicum Gottschl. & Dunkel
- Hieracium braendoeense Norrl.
- Hieracium brandelii (Dahlst. ex Zahn) Dahlst.
- Hieracium braunianum Zahn & Chen.
- Hieracium breacense P.D.Sell
- Hieracium breadalbanense F.Hanb.
- Hieracium breazense Nyár.
- Hieracium breconense P.D.Sell
- Hieracium breconicola P.D.Sell
- Hieracium breimense Omang
- Hieracium breve Beeby
- Hieracium brevialatum Johanss. & Sam.
- Hieracium breviatum Norrl.
- Hieracium brevicollum Notø
- Hieracium brevifloriferum Folin
- Hieracium brevifolium Tausch
- Hieracium breviglandulosum McCosh
- Hieracium breviglandulum Folin
- Hieracium brevilanosum Degen & Zahn
- Hieracium breviligulatum Johanss.
- Hieracium brevilingua Dahlst.
- Hieracium brevipilosum Johanss. & Sam.
- Hieracium brevipilum Greene
- Hieracium brevivestitum Folin
- Hieracium brevivittatum Brenner
- Hieracium brezianum Mateo, Egido & Gómiz
- Hieracium brigantum (F.Hanb.) Roffey
- Hieracium brillii Gottschl.
- Hieracium britanniciforme Pugsley
- Hieracium britannicoides P.D.Sell
- Hieracium britannicum F.Hanb.
- Hieracium brotheri Norrl.
- Hieracium bruchense Mateo, Egido & Gómiz
- Hieracium brunellicuspis Johanss.
- Hieracium bucovinense Prodan
- Hieracium bucuranum Nyár.
- Hieracium bugellense Gottschl.
- Hieracium bupleuroides C.C.Gmel.
- Hieracium burkartii Sleumer
- Hieracium burlei (Zahn) J.-M.Tison
- Hieracium burnatii Arv.-Touv.
- Hieracium burserianum Arv.-Touv.
- Hieracium busambarense Caldarella, Gianguzzi & Gottschl.

== C ==
- Hieracium cabreranum Arv.-Touv.
- Hieracium cabrillanense Mateo, Egido & Gómiz
- Hieracium cacrayense Zahn
- Hieracium cacuminatum (Dahlst.) Dahlst.
- Hieracium cacuminiustum Ohlsén
- Hieracium cacuminum (Ley) Ley
- Hieracium caesariatellum Omang
- Hieracium caesiicolor Dahlst.
- Hieracium caesiifloroides Üksip
- Hieracium caesiifolium Omang
- Hieracium caesiofloccosum Johanss. & Sam.
- Hieracium caesiogenum Woł. & Zahn
- Hieracium caesioides Arv.-Touv.
- Hieracium caesiolympicum Gottschl. & Dunkel
- Hieracium caesionigrescens Dahlst.
- Hieracium caesiopellitum Johanss.
- Hieracium caesiopilosum Pugsley
- Hieracium caesiotinctum Dahlst. & Johanss.
- Hieracium caesitiifolium Norrl.
- Hieracium caesitiiforme Omang
- Hieracium caesitiifrons Omang
- Hieracium caesitioides Brenner
- Hieracium caesitium (Norrl.) Brenner
- Hieracium caesium (Fr.) Fr.
- Hieracium caespitans Dahlst.
- Hieracium caespiticola Norrl.
- Hieracium caespitiforme Brenner
- Hieracium cajanderi Norrl.
- Hieracium calatharium Johanss.
- Hieracium calcareum Bernh. ex Hornem.
- Hieracium calcaricola (F.Hanb.) Roffey
- Hieracium calcimoncayense Mateo, Egido & Gómiz
- Hieracium calcogeton (Zahn) Greuter
- Hieracium caledonicum F.Hanb.
- Hieracium calenduliflorum Backh.f.
- Hieracium caliginosum (Dahlst.) Brenner
- Hieracium callichlorum Litv. & Zahn
- Hieracium calliglaucum Omang
- Hieracium callistophyllum F.Hanb.
- Hieracium calochroma Johanss.
- Hieracium calocymum Zahn
- Hieracium calophylloides Rohlena & Zahn
- Hieracium calophyllomorphum
- Hieracium calophyllum R.Uechtr.
- Hieracium calothyrsum Zahn ex Murr
- Hieracium caloxanthum Johanss. & Sam.
- Hieracium calvum P.D.Sell & D.J.Tennant
- Hieracium cambrense McCosh
- Hieracium cambricogothicum Pugsley
- Hieracium cambricum (Baker) F.Hanb.
- Hieracium camkorijense Zahn
- Hieracium campolenum Omang
- Hieracium camptopetalum (F.Hanb.) P.D.Sell & C.West
- Hieracium campylodon (Dahlst. ex Zahn) Johanss.
- Hieracium camurum Johanss.
- Hieracium candanchuanum Mateo, Egido & Gómiz
- Hieracium candelabrae W.R.Linton
- Hieracium candidum Scheele
- Hieracium canescens Schleich.
- Hieracium caniceps Norrl.
- Hieracium canipediforme Dahlst.
- Hieracium canipedifrons Folin
- Hieracium canipedioides Notø
- Hieracium canipes (Almq. ex Stenstr.) Dahlst.
- Hieracium caniphyllum Notø
- Hieracium canipioides Notø
- Hieracium canistrale Johanss.
- Hieracium canitulum Notø
- Hieracium canomarginatum Brenner
- Hieracium canostriatum Folin
- Hieracium canoturbinatum Johanss.
- Hieracium canovirens Brenner
- Hieracium canoviridiceps Folin
- Hieracium canovittatum Ohlsén
- Hieracium cantalicum Arv.-Touv.
- Hieracium cantianum F.Hanb.
- Hieracium canulescens Omang ex Dahlst.
- Hieracium canum Peter
- Hieracium caperatum Johanss.
- Hieracium capitonale Johanss.
- Hieracium capituliferum Dahlst.
- Hieracium capnostyloides Dahlst.
- Hieracium capnostylum Dahlst. & Elfstr.
- Hieracium capnotrichoides Dahlst. ex Notø
- Hieracium capnotrichoidiceps Notø
- Hieracium capnotrichum Dahlst. ex Notø
- Hieracium carabopsis Omang
- Hieracium caraeum Omang
- Hieracium cardoanum Mateo, L.Sáez, Egido & Gómiz
- Hieracium carenorum F.Hanb.
- Hieracium carinthiostiriacum Vetter & Zahn
- Hieracium carlsonii Notø
- Hieracium carneddorum Pugsley
- Hieracium carneum Greene
- Hieracium carnosiceps Johanss.
- Hieracium carolipauanum Mateo
- Hieracium carpathicum Besser
- Hieracium carpegnae Gottschl.
- Hieracium carpetanum Willk.
- Hieracium carroceranum Mateo & Egido
- Hieracium casamierense Mateo & Gómiz
- Hieracium casciceps Dahlst.
- Hieracium catalanoalpinum Mateo, Egido & Gómiz
- Hieracium cataleptum Norrl.
- Hieracium catamarcense Sleumer
- Hieracium cataponum Omang
- Hieracium cataractarum Arv.-Touv. & Huter
- Hieracium catenatum Sennikov
- Hieracium catillifolium Johanss.
- Hieracium catoxyides Omang
- Hieracium catoxylepis Omang
- Hieracium caucasiense Arv.-Touv. ex Lipsky
- Hieracium caudatulum Almq. ex Johanss.
- Hieracium causiatum Johanss. & Sam.
- Hieracium cavallense Gottschl.
- Hieracium cavanillesianum Arv.-Touv. & Gaut.
- Hieracium cavillieri Zahn
- Hieracium celsipes Norrl.
- Hieracium celsum Notø
- Hieracium centonale Johanss. & Sam.
- Hieracium centripetale F.Hanb.
- Hieracium centrotum Johanss. & Sam.
- Hieracium cephalochnoum Ósk.
- Hieracium cephalotes Arv.-Touv.
- Hieracium ceradenium Brenner
- Hieracium ceramotum (Stenstr.) Dahlst.
- Hieracium cercidotelmatodes Üksip
- Hieracium cercsianum Mateo, Egido & Gómiz
- Hieracium ceresianum Mateo, Egido & Gómiz
- Hieracium cerinthiforme Backh.f. ex F.Hanb.
- Hieracium cerinthoides L.
- Hieracium cerleri Mateo, Egido & Gómiz
- Hieracium cernagorae Zahn
- Hieracium cerussatiforme Johanss.
- Hieracium cerussatum Johanss.
- Hieracium cezycola Arv.-Touv. & Gaut.
- Hieracium chaboissaei Arv.-Touv.
- Hieracium chacoense (Zahn) Sleumer
- Hieracium chaetolepis Ósk.
- Hieracium chaetophyllum Ósk.
- Hieracium chaixianum Arv.-Touv. & Gaut.
- Hieracium chalasinense Zahn
- Hieracium chalcidicum Boiss. & Heldr.
- Hieracium chamaeadenium Oborný & Zahn
- Hieracium chamaecephalum Ósk.
- Hieracium chamaecerinthe Arv.-Touv. & Gaut.
- Hieracium chamaenerides Norrl.
- Hieracium chamaeodon Ósk.
- Hieracium chamar-dabanense Tupitz.
- Hieracium chandolygodes Omang
- Hieracium chaozum Omang
- Hieracium charactophyllum Omang
- Hieracium charitodon P.D.Sell
- Hieracium charitopoides Omang
- Hieracium chasmataeum Omang
- Hieracium chauliodon (Dahlst.) Dahlst. ex Johanss.
- Hieracium cheilochnoum Omang
- Hieracium cheirifolium Boiss. & Hausskn.
- Hieracium chiariglionei Gottschl.
- Hieracium chibinense Schljakov
- Hieracium chibinicola Schljakov
- Hieracium chilense Less.
- Hieracium chloanocybe Dahlst. ex Johanss.
- Hieracium chloeropis Johanss. & Sam.
- Hieracium chloocranum Johanss.
- Hieracium chloranthum Pugsley ex P.D.Sell
- Hieracium chlorellifrons Dahlst. ex Notø
- Hieracium chlorelloides Zahn
- Hieracium chlorellum Norrl.
- Hieracium chlorifolium Arv.-Touv.
- Hieracium chlorinum Sennikov
- Hieracium chlorobracteum Degen & Zahn
- Hieracium chlorocalpis Omang
- Hieracium chlorocephalum R.Uechtr.
- Hieracium chlorodepades Omang
- Hieracium chlorodes (Dahlst.) Dahlst.
- Hieracium chlorolepidotum
- Hieracium chloroleucum Dahlst.
- Hieracium chloroloma Brenner
- Hieracium chlorolomiceps T.Tyler
- Hieracium chlorolopodes Omang
- Hieracium chloromaurum Johanss.
- Hieracium chloromuticum Notø
- Hieracium chloropannosum
- Hieracium chlorophanifolium Nota
- Hieracium chlorophyton Preissm. & Zahn
- Hieracium chloropoecilum Dahlst. ex Johanss.
- Hieracium chloropsis Gren.
- Hieracium chloropterum Brenner
- Hieracium chnootum Omang
- Hieracium chondracidium Omang
- Hieracium chondrillifolium Fr.
- Hieracium chondrodes (Dahlst.) Johanss.
- Hieracium chordosum Johanss.
- Hieracium chordum Ósk.
- Hieracium choristodon Omang
- Hieracium christianbernardii de Retz
- Hieracium chroocentrum (Dahlst. ex Zahn) T.Tyler
- Hieracium chrysanthemum Saelán ex Norrl.
- Hieracium chrysocladium Ósk.
- Hieracium chrysolepis Notø
- Hieracium chrysolorum P.D.Sell & C.West
- Hieracium chrysophorum Sam.
- Hieracium chrysoprasium Norrl. & H.Lindb.
- Hieracium chrysostyloides (Zahn) Chrtek f.
- Hieracium chrysostylum (Lindeb.) Elfstr.
- Hieracium cienegae Zahn
- Hieracium ciliatiflorum Pugsley
- Hieracium ciliatiforme Dahlst.
- Hieracium ciliatissimum Elfstr. ex Omang
- Hieracium cillense Pugsley
- Hieracium cincinnatum Fr.
- Hieracium cinderella (Ley) Ley
- Hieracium cinerelliceps Stenstrom
- Hieracium cinerelliforme (Dahlst. ex Zahn) Dahlst.
- Hieracium cinerellisquamum (Litv. & Zahn) Schljakov
- Hieracium cinerellum Almq. ex Johanss.
- Hieracium cinereotectum Johanss.
- Hieracium cineriticeps Omang
- Hieracium cineritum Dahlst. ex Notø
- Hieracium circulare Wiinst.
- Hieracium circumvietum Johanss. & Sam.
- Hieracium cirritogenes Zahn
- Hieracium cirritum Arv.-Touv.
- Hieracium cirrobractum T.Tyler
- Hieracium cirrostyliforme Omang
- Hieracium cirsiifolium Norrl.
- Hieracium cirsiiforme Norrl. ex H.Lindb.
- Hieracium cirsiopsis Gottschl. & Dunkel
- Hieracium cischibinense Schljakov
- Hieracium cistiernense Mateo & Alejandre
- Hieracium cisuralense Schljakov
- Hieracium ciuriwkae (Woł. & Zahn) Schljakov
- Hieracium cladiopogon Ósk.
- Hieracium cladotenum Omang
- Hieracium cladotrichum Omang
- Hieracium claricolor Johanss.
- Hieracium cleistogamum Dahlst.
- Hieracium clematidodes Omang
- Hieracium clinocladium Notø
- Hieracium clinoglossum Norrl.
- Hieracium clivicola (F.Hanb.) Pugsley
- Hieracium clivorum Standl. & Steyerm.
- Hieracium clomacotes Omang
- Hieracium clonodes Omang
- Hieracium clovense E.F.Linton
- Hieracium coadunaticeps Omang
- Hieracium coadunatum (Dahlst.) Johanss.
- Hieracium coalitum Dahlst. ex Johanss.
- Hieracium coderianum Arv.-Touv. & Gaut.
- Hieracium codesianum Mateo
- Hieracium cognatum T.Tyler & Sennikov
- Hieracium colapterodon Omang
- Hieracium coleoides Arv.-Touv. & Gaut.
- Hieracium collatatum Brenner
- Hieracium collaterale Norrl. & Palmgr.
- Hieracium collettianum Omang
- Hieracium collicola Norrl. & H.Lindb.
- Hieracium collsuspinense Mateo, Egido & Gómiz
- Hieracium colmeiroanum Arv.-Touv. & Gaut.
- Hieracium colobanthum Omang
- Hieracium colocentrum (Dahlst. ex Zahn) Notø
- Hieracium cologlossum Omang
- Hieracium coloplastum Omang
- Hieracium coloratum Elfstr.
- Hieracium colorhizum Arv.-Touv. & Gaut.
- Hieracium coloriscapum Rohlena & Zahn
- Hieracium colpodes Norrl.
- Hieracium colpophylloides Johanss. & Sam.
- Hieracium colpophyllum Johanss.
- Hieracium columniforme Johanss.
- Hieracium comanticeps Johanss.
- Hieracium comasinum Zahn
- Hieracium combense Zahn
- Hieracium comitans Hyl.
- Hieracium commenticium Notø
- Hieracium commersonii Monnier
- Hieracium comosum Elfstr.
- Hieracium compactum Folin
- Hieracium compar Dahlst.
- Hieracium comparile Brenner
- Hieracium compitale Johanss. & Sam.
- Hieracium completum P.D.Sell & C.West
- Hieracium complexum Johanss.
- Hieracium compositum Lapeyr.
- Hieracium compsum Omang
- Hieracium comptellum Notø
- Hieracium comulatum Brenner
- Hieracium concinnatum Ohlsén
- Hieracium concinniusculum Omang
- Hieracium concrescens Norrl.
- Hieracium concretum Dahlst. ex Johanss.
- Hieracium condensifolium Notø
- Hieracium condensiforme Notø
- Hieracium condylodes Brenner
- Hieracium confertum (Lindeb.) Lindeb. ex Dahlst.
- Hieracium conformatum Omang
- Hieracium confragifolium Johanss.
- Hieracium congenitum (Dahlst.) Dahlst.
- Hieracium conglutinans Omang
- Hieracium congruens Norrl.
- Hieracium conibasum Note
- Hieracium coniceps Dahlst.
- Hieracium conicum Arv.-Touv.
- Hieracium coniellum Omang
- Hieracium coniocephalum Dahlst. ex Brenner
- Hieracium coniops Norrl.
- Hieracium coniopum Norrl.
- Hieracium × conjunctum Gus.Schneid.
- Hieracium connexuosum Omang
- Hieracium conolepis Brenner
- Hieracium conquense Mateo
- Hieracium conscissum Johanss.
- Hieracium conspectum Ohlsén
- Hieracium conspurcans Norrl.
- Hieracium constans Omang
- Hieracium constrictiforme Dahlst.
- Hieracium contaminatum Wiinst. & Hyl.
- Hieracium contii Gottschl.
- Hieracium continuum (Norrl. & H.Lindb. ex Zahn) Johanss.
- Hieracium contracticeps Dahlst.
- Hieracium contrarium Johanss.
- Hieracium convergens Folin
- Hieracium convergentipes Folin
- Hieracium copephorum Omang
- Hieracium cophodon Omang
- Hieracium copholepium (Dahlst. ex Zahn) Dahlst. ex Notø
- Hieracium cophomeles Omang
- Hieracium cophopum Omang
- Hieracium coracinum Dahlst.
- Hieracium coracolaenum Omang
- Hieracium corconticum K.Knaf ex Čelak.
- Hieracium cordatum Scheele ex Costa
- Hieracium cordigerum (Norrl.) Dahlst.
- Hieracium cordobense Sleumer
- Hieracium coriarium Johanss.
- Hieracium cornescens Johanss. & Sam.
- Hieracium corniculans Johanss.
- Hieracium cornigerum
- Hieracium cornuscalae Gottschl.
- Hieracium coronariifolium Arv.-Touv.
- Hieracium coronarium Brenner
- Hieracium corrensii Kaeser ex Zahn
- Hieracium corruscans Fr.
- Hieracium corsentinum Zahn
- Hieracium corvinum Johanss.
- Hieracium corynellum Norrl.
- Hieracium corynodes Johanss.
- Hieracium cosmiodontum Omang
- Hieracium cottetii Christener
- Hieracium cotyliscophorum Omang
- Hieracium covaledanum Mateo
- Hieracium craspedotum Omang
- Hieracium crassiceps (Dahlst.) Dahlst.
- Hieracium crassifoliiforme Schljakov
- Hieracium crassipedipilum (Pawł. & Zahn) Chrtek f.
- Hieracium craterocephalum Omang
- Hieracium craterodon Johanss.
- Hieracium cravoniense (F.Hanb.) Roffey
- Hieracium crebridens Dahlst. ex F.N.Williams
- Hieracium crebridentiforme Pugsley
- Hieracium crebriserratum Hyl.
- Hieracium cremiceps T.Tyler
- Hieracium cremnaeiforme (Omang) Omang
- Hieracium cremnaeum Omang
- Hieracium cremnanthes (F.Hanb.) Pugsley
- Hieracium crenosum Johanss.
- Hieracium creperiforme Johanss.
- Hieracium creperum (Stenstr.) Dahlst.
- Hieracium crepidioides Norrl. ex Brenner
- Hieracium crepidispermum Fr.
- Hieracium cretatum Dahlst.
- Hieracium crinellum Omang
- Hieracium criniceps Sleumer
- Hieracium criniculosum Johanss.
- Hieracium crinitopannosum Szeląg & Vladimir.
- Hieracium crinosum Omang
- Hieracium crispatulum Hyl.
- Hieracium crispicans (Johanss.) Johanss.
- Hieracium crispiceps Brenner
- Hieracium crispiforme Dahlst.
- Hieracium crispifrons Omang
- Hieracium crispulum Norrl.
- Hieracium crocatoides Notø
- Hieracium crocatum Fr.
- Hieracium crossotum Omang
- Hieracium cruciatum Schljakov
- Hieracium cruentiferum (Norrl. & H.Lindb.) Brenner
- Hieracium cruentifolium Dahlst. & Lübeck
- Hieracium cryptadenum Arv.-Touv.
- Hieracium cryptanthum Arv.-Touv. & Marcailhou
- Hieracium cryptocaesium Gottschl.
- Hieracium ctenodon Nägeli & Peter
- Hieracium ctenophyllum Ohlsén
- Hieracium cubillanum de Retz
- Hieracium culminatum Omang
- Hieracium cultratum
- Hieracium cumatile Johanss.
- Hieracium cumbriense F.Hanb.
- Hieracium cumulatum Notø
- Hieracium cuncolatoides Notø
- Hieracium cuneifrons (W.R.Linton) Pugsley
- Hieracium cuneolarium Omang
- Hieracium cuneolatum (Stenstr.) Dahlst.
- Hieracium cuphodomum Omang
- Hieracium cuprimontanum Dahlst. & Johanss.
- Hieracium curtipedunculum Norrl.
- Hieracium curtispicans Omang
- Hieracium curtivittatum Brenner
- Hieracium curvaticranum Notø
- Hieracium curvatiforme Dahlst.
- Hieracium curvatipes Elfstr.
- Hieracium curvatoides Notø
- Hieracium curvatum (Elfstr.) Elfstr.
- Hieracium curvifrons Folin
- Hieracium curviramum Notø
- Hieracium cuspidelliforme Üksip
- Hieracium cuspidellum (Pohle & Zahn) Üksip
- Hieracium cuspidens P.D.Sell & C.West
- Hieracium cuspididentatum Ohlsén
- Hieracium cuspidifolium Brenner
- Hieracium cuspidifrons (Zahn) Mateo, Egido & Gómiz
- Hieracium cyclicum P.D.Sell
- Hieracium cyclum (Dahlst. ex Zahn) Dahlst. ex Johanss.
- Hieracium cydoniifolium Vill.
- Hieracium cymaterum Johanss.
- Hieracium cymbifolium Purchas
- Hieracium cynanchoides Arv.-Touv. & Gaut.
- Hieracium cynodon Brenner
- Hieracium cyrtocladum Hyl.
- Hieracium cyrtotrachelum (Zahn) Dahlst.
- Hieracium czadanense Tupitz.
- Hieracium czaiense Schischk. & Serg.
- Hieracium czamyjashense Tupitz.
- Hieracium czeremoszense Woł. & Zahn
- Hieracium czeschaense Schljakov
- Hieracium czunense Schljakov

== D ==
- Hieracium dacicum R.Uechtr.
- Hieracium dactylites Dahlst. & Enander ex Johanss.
- Hieracium daedalocephalum Dahlst.
- Hieracium daedalolepioides (Zahn) Roffey
- Hieracium daedalolepium (Dahlst.) Johanss.
- Hieracium daedalum Dahlst.
- Hieracium dagoense Üksip
- Hieracium dahlstedtii Almq. ex Elfstr.
- Hieracium dalecarlicum Sam.
- Hieracium dalenense Notø
- Hieracium dalense P.D.Sell
- Hieracium dalicum Johanss.
- Hieracium dalkarlbyense Norrl.
- Hieracium daniciforme Johanss.
- Hieracium dasychaetocomum Zahn
- Hieracium dasychaetoides Notø
- Hieracium dasychaetum Dahlst. ex Omang
- Hieracium dasycranum Johanss. & Sam.
- Hieracium dasycraspedum Buttler
- Hieracium dasythrix (E.F.Linton) Pugsley
- Hieracium dasytomum Johanss. & Sam.
- Hieracium dasytrachelum Dahlst.
- Hieracium dasytrichum Arv.-Touv.
- Hieracium davidsonii Omang
- Hieracium deansatum Johanss.
- Hieracium deargicola P.D.Sell & D.J.Tennant
- Hieracium debile Fr.
- Hieracium decessum Notø
- Hieracium decipientiforme (Woł. & Zahn) Schljakov
- Hieracium declivium Norrl. ex Üksip
- Hieracium decolor (W.R.Linton) Ley
- Hieracium decorans Hyl.
- Hieracium decurrens Norrl.
- Hieracium decurrentidens Dahlst.
- Hieracium decursum Notø
- Hieracium dedovii Schljakov
- Hieracium deflectum Notø
- Hieracium deganwyense Pugsley
- Hieracium degeroeense Saelán ex Norrl.
- Hieracium delegidoi Mateo & Gómiz
- Hieracium deleniens Omang
- Hieracium delime Johanss. & Sam.
- Hieracium delineatum Norrl.
- Hieracium deltoideum Brenner
- Hieracium demetrii Schljakov
- Hieracium demissum (Strömf.) Dahlst.
- Hieracium demorsum Norrl.
- Hieracium demutabile Johanss. & Sam.
- Hieracium demutatifolium Notø
- Hieracium demutatum Notø
- Hieracium denigrans (Dahlst.) Johanss.
- Hieracium densedenticulatum Folin
- Hieracium densicomosum Folin
- Hieracium densilingua Norrl.
- Hieracium densipellitum Hyl.
- Hieracium dentalatum Omang
- Hieracium dentatum Hoppe
- Hieracium dentex Wiinst.
- Hieracium denticulare Omang
- Hieracium denticulosifolium Omang
- Hieracium dentidecurrens Folin
- Hieracium dentifolium (C.G.Westerl.) Johanss. & Sam.
- Hieracium dentulum (E.F.Linton) P.D.Sell
- Hieracium depilatum
- Hieracium deplumatum Johanss.
- Hieracium derivatum Norrl.
- Hieracium dermatodes Johanss. & Sam.
- Hieracium dermophyllum Arv.-Touv. & Briq.
- Hieracium dertosense Mateo
- Hieracium deruptorum Omang
- Hieracium designatum Norrl.
- Hieracium detonsatum Norrl. & Palmgr.
- Hieracium detruncatum (Zahn) Nordh.
- Hieracium devestitum Ohlsén
- Hieracium devians Dahlst.
- Hieracium devoratum Mateo, Egido & Gómiz
- Hieracium dewarii Syme
- Hieracium diacritum Omang
- Hieracium dialeptum Omang
- Hieracium diaphanellum Brenner
- Hieracium diaphanoides Lindeb.
- Hieracium diaphanoidopsis Gottschl. & Dunkel
- Hieracium diaphanomorphum (Dahlst. ex Zahn) Dahlst. ex Johanss.
- Hieracium diaphanum Fr.
- Hieracium diapsarum Omang
- Hieracium diasterodes Omang
- Hieracium dicella P.D.Sell & C.West
- Hieracium dichoteriopogon Mateo
- Hieracium dicranozum Omang
- Hieracium didymanthum (Dahlst. & Enander ex Zahn) Dahlst. & Enander ex Johanss.
- Hieracium didymiceps Folin
- Hieracium didymocephalum Dahlst. ex Notø
- Hieracium difficile P.D.Sell & C.West
- Hieracium digeneum Burnat & Gremli
- Hieracium dilectum P.D.Sell & C.West
- Hieracium dilucidiusculum Omang
- Hieracium diluticeps Norrl.
- Hieracium diminuens (Norrl.) Norrl.
- Hieracium diminutiforme Johanss.
- Hieracium diminutulum Norrl.
- Hieracium diminutum Lindeberg ex Omang
- Hieracium dimistum Johanss.
- Hieracium dimoniei Zahn
- Hieracium dimorphophyllum Dahlst. ex Notø
- Hieracium diphyllum Hyl.
- Hieracium dipteroides Dahlst.
- Hieracium dipterum (Dahlst. & Enander ex Zahn) Dahlst. & Enander ex Johanss.
- Hieracium diremtum Norrl.
- Hieracium discessum Notø
- Hieracium discophyllum P.D.Sell & C.West
- Hieracium dispansiforme Norrl.
- Hieracium disparans Omang
- Hieracium disparile Norrl. & Palmgr.
- Hieracium dispergens Norrl.
- Hieracium dispersifrons Omang
- Hieracium dissimile Lindeb. ex Elfstr.
- Hieracium dissomorphum (Dahlst. ex Zahn) Dahlst. ex Johanss. & Sam.
- Hieracium dissotocoides Omang
- Hieracium dissotocum Omang
- Hieracium distanticeps Folin
- Hieracium distendens Brenner
- Hieracium distinctisquameum Brenner
- Hieracium distinctum (Stenstr.) Dahlst.
- Hieracium distractifolium Schljakov
- Hieracium distrudens Johanss. & Sam.
- Hieracium distubellatum Johanss.
- Hieracium divaricatum Fr.
- Hieracium diversidens P.D.Sell & C.West
- Hieracium divisum Jord.
- Hieracium djimilense Boiss. & Balansa
- Hieracium dolabratum (Norrl.) Norrl.
- Hieracium doliariceps Omang
- Hieracium dolichadenium Dahlst.
- Hieracium dolichaetum Arv.-Touv. ex Zahn
- Hieracium dolichanthelum Schljakov
- Hieracium dolichocranum Notø
- Hieracium dolichophyllum Hyl.
- Hieracium dolichorhachis Sam.
- Hieracium dolichosphaericum (Zahn) Greuter
- Hieracium dolichotrichum Schljakov
- Hieracium dollineri Sch.Bip. ex Neilr.
- Hieracium dolorosum McCosh
- Hieracium dominae-ericae Mateo, Egido & Gómiz
- Hieracium doronicifolium Arv.-Touv.
- Hieracium dovrense Fr.
- Hieracium dowardense P.D.Sell
- Hieracium dragicola (Nägeli & Peter) Zahn
- Hieracium drazeticum Arv.-Touv. & Marcailhou
- Hieracium drimyodon (Dahlst. ex Zahn) Dahlst. ex Johanss.
- Hieracium drivstuense Norrl.
- Hieracium drosocalyx Brenner
- Hieracium drummondii Pugsley
- Hieracium duderhultense Johanss.
- Hieracium dunkelii Gottschl.
- Hieracium duplicaticeps Folin
- Hieracium durans (Notø) Notø
- Hieracium duriceps F.Hanb.
- Hieracium duronense Gottschl.
- Hieracium durum Hyl.
- Hieracium dyringii (Dahlst. ex Zahn) Dahlst. ex Johanss.
- Hieracium dyscimon Dahlst. ex Notø
- Hieracium dysonymum S.F.Blake
- Hieracium dystactodon Omang
- Hieracium dystrichotum Omang

== E ==
- Hieracium ebenarium (Johanss. ex Dahlst.) Dahlst.
- Hieracium eboracense Pugsley
- Hieracium ebudicum Pugsley
- Hieracium echinodes Omang
- Hieracium ecuadoriense Arv.-Touv. ex Peter
- Hieracium edselense Johanss.
- Hieracium egenum Folin
- Hieracium egidoanum Mateo
- Hieracium eichvaldii Üksip
- Hieracium einarssonii Ósk.
- Hieracium einichense P.D.Sell & D.J.Tennant
- Hieracium elachacladium Omang
- Hieracium elaeinum Norrl.
- Hieracium elaeochlorum Schljakov
- Hieracium elaeodes Brenner
- Hieracium electum Brenner
- Hieracium elegans Lindeb.
- Hieracium elegantidens Zahn
- Hieracium elegantiforme Dahlst.
- Hieracium elevatum P.D.Sell
- Hieracium elisaeanum Arv.-Touv. ex Willk.
- Hieracium ellipsoideum Wiinst.
- Hieracium elongatifolium P.D.Sell
- Hieracium elongatifrons Omang
- Hieracium elvdalense Sam.
- Hieracium emaceraticeps Omang
- Hieracium emblae T.Tyler
- Hieracium eminentiforme Pugsley
- Hieracium enallophyllum Omang
- Hieracium enantiodon Omang
- Hieracium endaurovae Üksip
- Hieracium ensiculare Omang
- Hieracium entleutneri Zahn ex Gottschl.
- Hieracium epacrum Stenstr. ex Dahlst.
- Hieracium epeonium Omang
- Hieracium eperythrum Omang
- Hieracium epholcocephalum Dahlst. ex Omang
- Hieracium epibalium Omang
- Hieracium epichloum Omang
- Hieracium epicrocifolium Johanss.
- Hieracium epilepideum Omang
- Hieracium epinephum Omang
- Hieracium epipolium Omang
- Hieracium epipsilum Hyl.
- Hieracium episcotum (Omang) Omang
- Hieracium erectellum Omang
- Hieracium erectifrons (Zahn) Omang
- Hieracium erectiramum T.E.Nilsson
- Hieracium eremnocephalum Omang
- Hieracium eriadenium Sleumer
- Hieracium erianthum Kunth
- Hieracium ericeticola Schljakov
- Hieracium erigentiforme Norrl.
- Hieracium erigescens Omang
- Hieracium eriobasis Freyn & Sint.
- Hieracium erioleucum Zahn
- Hieracium erioneurum Hyl.
- Hieracium eriophorum St.-Amans
- Hieracium eriopogon Arv.-Touv. & Gaut.
- Hieracium eriosaliencianum Mateo, Egido & Gómiz
- Hieracium eriphyllum Johanss.
- Hieracium eripoliodes (Omang) Omang
- Hieracium erithallum Johanss. & Sam.
- Hieracium erosulum Arv.-Touv. & Gaut.
- Hieracium erucophyllum Prain
- Hieracium erucopsis Gottschl.
- Hieracium erysibodes Dahlst.
- Hieracium erythrolepis Norrl.
- Hieracium erythropoecilum Dahlst.
- Hieracium erythrostictum Omang
- Hieracium escalanteae Mateo & Alejandre
- Hieracium esketanense Stenstr.
- Hieracium estellatum Johanss. & Sam.
- Hieracium ethologum Johanss. & Sam.
- Hieracium eubalium Dahlst.
- Hieracium eucallum P.D.Sell & C.West
- Hieracium eucalyptum Omang
- Hieracium eucharactoides Omang
- Hieracium euchloodes (Dahlst. ex Zahn) Dahlst. ex Johanss.
- Hieracium euctenodon Omang
- Hieracium eudaedalium Stenstr. ex Dahlst.
- Hieracium eueimon Omang
- Hieracium euexum Omang
- Hieracium euglaucum Omang
- Hieracium euglossoides Dahlst.
- Hieracium euglossum Dahlst.
- Hieracium eugraptum Omang
- Hieracium eulagarum Elfstr.
- Hieracium eulasium Dahlst. ex T.Tyler
- Hieracium eulepodes Omang
- Hieracium eumeces Johanss.
- Hieracium euparyphum Omang
- Hieracium euphyllotum Omang
- Hieracium euplytocephalum Omang
- Hieracium eupristum (Dahlst. ex Zahn) Dahlst. ex Johanss.
- Hieracium euprosopum Omang
- Hieracium eurhacidophyllum Omang
- Hieracium eurofinmarkicum (Norrl.) Schljakov
- Hieracium eurototum Omang
- Hieracium euryeilema Brenner
- Hieracium eurygonium Johanss.
- Hieracium eurylobum (Dahlst. ex Zahn) Dahlst. ex Johanss.
- Hieracium eurynotum Dahlst. ex Notø
- Hieracium euryozum Omang
- Hieracium euscepanum Omang
- Hieracium eustales E.F.Linton
- Hieracium eustictiforme Wiinst.
- Hieracium eustomon (E.F.Linton) Roffey
- Hieracium euthetodon Omang
- Hieracium euthylepioides Omang
- Hieracium euthylepis Omang
- Hieracium euthysanum Johanss.
- Hieracium eutrichum Omang
- Hieracium eutypotum Omang
- Hieracium evae T.Tyler
- Hieracium evernium Norrl. & H.Lindb.
- Hieracium eversianum Arv.-Touv. ex Murr
- Hieracium eviridatum (Johanss.) Johanss.
- Hieracium evolsum Notø
- Hieracium exacuticeps Norrl.
- Hieracium exacutiforme Norrl.
- Hieracium exadsimilans Notø
- Hieracium exaequans Johanss. & Sam.
- Hieracium exaltans Dahlst.
- Hieracium exarmatum Elfstr.
- Hieracium exasciatiforme Omang
- Hieracium excellens Murr ex Zahn
- Hieracium excretum Omang
- Hieracium excubitum Elfstr.
- Hieracium exfestiviforme Notø
- Hieracium exile Brenner
- Hieracium exilicaule Gottschl.
- Hieracium eximium Backh.f.
- Hieracium exomilum Omang
- Hieracium expallescens (Dahlst.) Dahlst. ex Johanss.
- Hieracium expallidiceps Dahlst. ex Notø
- Hieracium expallidiforme (Dahlst. ex Stenstr.) Dahlst.
- Hieracium expallidulum Dahlst. ex Notø
- Hieracium expallidum Norrl.
- Hieracium expansiceps Elfstr.
- Hieracium expansifolium Notø
- Hieracium expansiforme Dahlst.
- Hieracium expansum Dahlst.
- Hieracium explanatifolium Omang
- Hieracium expletum Norrl.
- Hieracium exporrectum (Johanss.) Dahlst.
- Hieracium expressiusculum Omang
- Hieracium exsiliusculum (Omang) Omang
- Hieracium exstructum Omang
- Hieracium exsulans Ohlsén
- Hieracium extensifrons Folin
- Hieracium extensum Lübeck ex Lindeb.
- Hieracium extentatum Omang
- Hieracium exterium Notø
- Hieracium externum Ohlsén
- Hieracium extracticaule (Omang) Omang
- Hieracium extracticeps Dahlst. ex Notø
- Hieracium extumidum Johanss.
- Hieracium exutum Norrl.

== F ==
- Hieracium fabregatii Mateo
- Hieracium fagonianum Arv.-Touv. & Gaut.
- Hieracium fagopalentinum Mateo, Egido & Gómiz
- Hieracium falcatum Arv.-Touv.
- Hieracium falcidentatum Üksip
- Hieracium falcifolium Johanss. ex T.Tyler
- Hieracium falculiferum Omang
- Hieracium farinaceum (Stenstr.) Dahlst.
- Hieracium farinicolor Brenner
- Hieracium farinipes Norrl.
- Hieracium farreaticeps Dahlst.
- Hieracium farrense F.Hanb.
- Hieracium farumense (Dahlst. ex Zahn) Dahlst.
- Hieracium fasciculare Fr.
- Hieracium × fassettii Lepage
- Hieracium fastuosum Zahn
- Hieracium faucisjovis Gottschl.
- Hieracium faurelianum Maire
- Hieracium fauskense Notø
- Hieracium favratii Muret ex Gremli
- Hieracium fecundum Omang
- Hieracium felinum Brenner
- Hieracium femsioense Stenstr.
- Hieracium fendleri Sch.Bip.
- Hieracium fennoorbicantiforme Üksip
- Hieracium ferrandezii Mateo
- Hieracium fertilium Notø
- Hieracium festiviforme Dahlst. ex Notø
- Hieracium festivum (Dahlst. ex Zahn) Dahlst. ex Johanss.
- Hieracium figolsianum Mateo, Egido & Gómiz
- Hieracium figuerolae Mateo
- Hieracium filarszkyi Jáv. & Zahn
- Hieracium filiare Notø
- Hieracium filicladium Notø
- Hieracium filiflorum Folin
- Hieracium filisquamum P.D.Sell
- Hieracium filistramineum Nota
- Hieracium fimbriatum Arv.-Touv.
- Hieracium fimbrilliferum Norrl.
- Hieracium fimbriosiceps Omang
- Hieracium finmarkicum Elfstr.
- Hieracium finsaetense Omang
- Hieracium fioniae Dahlst.
- Hieracium firdiense Omang
- Hieracium firmifrons Dahlst. ex Notø
- Hieracium firmipilum Folin
- Hieracium firmulum Norrl.
- Hieracium fissiflorum Brenner
- Hieracium fissilinguum Omang
- Hieracium fissuricola P.D.Sell
- Hieracium flaccilingua Norrl.
- Hieracium fladvoldense Notø
- Hieracium flagelliferum Ravaud
- Hieracium flagriferum Johanss.
- Hieracium flavistylum (Dahlst. ex Zahn) Johanss. & Sam.
- Hieracium flavolutescens Norrl.
- Hieracium flexibipes Notø
- Hieracium floccellum
- Hieracium floccicaule Norrl.
- Hieracium flocciceps Norrl.
- Hieracium floccidorsum Omang
- Hieracium flocciferum Arv.-Touv.
- Hieracium floccilepium Dahlst. ex Omang
- Hieracium floccilimbatum (Dahlst.) Grontved
- Hieracium floccimarginatum Brenner
- Hieracium floccinargonense Mateo
- Hieracium floccinops (Elfstr.) Schljakov
- Hieracium flocciprenanthoides Mateo, Egido & Gómiz
- Hieracium floccisaliencianum Mateo, Egido & Gómiz
- Hieracium floccivestitum Folin
- Hieracium flocculipubens P.D.Sell
- Hieracium flocculosiforme P.D.Sell
- Hieracium flocculosum Backh.f.
- Hieracium flomense Omang
- Hieracium florescens Brenner
- Hieracium floridulum Notø
- Hieracium fluididens Omang
- Hieracium fodinarium Johanss.
- Hieracium foensianum Wiinst.
- Hieracium foliolatum Schljakov
- Hieracium folioliferum (Elfstr.) Norrl.
- Hieracium foliolosum Ósk.
- Hieracium fontanesianum
- Hieracium formigalense Mateo, Egido & Gómiz
- Hieracium formosum Omang
- Hieracium fortunatense Mateo
- Hieracium fosnaense Omang
- Hieracium foucaudianum Arv.-Touv.
- Hieracium fourcadei de Retz
- Hieracium fragilipes Norrl.
- Hieracium franconicum (Griseb.) Zahn
- Hieracium fratrum Pugsley
- Hieracium fraudans Norrl. ex Dahlst.
- Hieracium fraudulentum (Dahlst.) Brenner
- Hieracium fresserianum Mateo, Egido & Gómiz
- Hieracium frigidulans Zahn
- Hieracium fritschianum Hayek & Zahn
- Hieracium fritzei F.W.Schultz
- Hieracium fritzeiforme Zahn
- Hieracium froederstroemii Hyl.
- Hieracium froedingii (Dahlst. ex Zahn) Dahlst. ex Johanss.
- Hieracium froelichianum H.Buek
- Hieracium froelichii Fr.
- Hieracium frondiferum (Elfstr.) Elfstr.
- Hieracium fruticulescens Norrl.
- Hieracium fucatifolium P.D.Sell
- Hieracium fulcratum Arv.-Touv.
- Hieracium fuliginascens Norrl.
- Hieracium fuliginellum Dahlst.
- Hieracium fuliginosiforme Schljakov
- Hieracium fuliginosum (Laest.) Andersson
- Hieracium fulvasterum Johanss. & Sam.
- Hieracium fulvescens Norrl.
- Hieracium fulvipes Wedd.
- Hieracium fulvocaesium Pugsley
- Hieracium fumatipes Omang
- Hieracium funereum Johanss.
- Hieracium furfurosum (Dahlst.) Skottsb. & Vestergr.
- Hieracium furvellum Brenner
- Hieracium furvescens (Dahlst.) Omang
- Hieracium furvum Brenner
- Hieracium fuscicuspis Omang
- Hieracium fusciviride Ósk.
- Hieracium fuscocinereum Norrl.
- Hieracium fuscovillosulum Brenner
- Hieracium fuscovillosum Brenner
- Hieracium fuscoviolare Johanss.
- Hieracium fuscoviridiceps Folin

== G ==
- Hieracium gaeopetum Notø
- Hieracium gaeutaense Folin
- Hieracium galactiniceps Norrl.
- Hieracium galactobaptum Omang
- Hieracium galbanicolor Omang
- Hieracium galbeum Brenner
- Hieracium galeroides Gottschl.
- Hieracium galesii Prodan
- Hieracium ganeschinii Zahn
- Hieracium gardsbyense Johanss. & Sam.
- Hieracium gaudryi Boiss. & Orph.
- Hieracium gavellei de Retz
- Hieracium geilingeri Zahn
- Hieracium gemelliforme (Johanss.) Johanss.
- Hieracium gemelliparum Norrl.
- Hieracium gemellum Almq. ex Elfstr.
- Hieracium geminatiforme Schljakov
- Hieracium geminatum Norrl.
- Hieracium geminum Hayek & Zahn
- Hieracium geniceranum Mateo & Egido
- Hieracium georgieffii Zahn
- Hieracium gerontocephalum Hyl.
- Hieracium gigacantabricum Mateo, Egido & Alejandre
- Hieracium gigantellum Litv. & Zahn
- Hieracium gigantium Sleumer
- Hieracium gigantocephalum Ósk.
- Hieracium gigantocybe (Dahlst.) T.Tyler
- Hieracium gilense Ósk.
- Hieracium gilliesianum Sleumer
- Hieracium gilvocaniceps Johanss.
- Hieracium gjevilense Omang
- Hieracium glabratum Hoppe ex Willd.
- Hieracium glabricaule Omang
- Hieracium glabridens Elfstr.
- Hieracium glabriligulatum Norrl.
- Hieracium glandulatum Elfstr.
- Hieracium glanduliceps P.D.Sell & C.West
- Hieracium glandulidens P.D.Sell & C.West
- Hieracium glandulimarginatum Omang
- Hieracium glandulosodentatum R.Uechtr.
- Hieracium glaucelloides Omang
- Hieracium glaucellum Lindeb.
- Hieracium glaucicolor Dahlst.
- Hieracium glaucifolium Poepp. ex Froel.
- Hieracium glaucinifrons (Zahn) Johanss.
- Hieracium glaucinum Jord.
- Hieracium glaucolopodes Omang
- Hieracium glaucomorphum Zahn
- Hieracium glaucopallidulum Johanss. & Sam.
- Hieracium glaucophylloides Sudre
- Hieracium glaucophyllum Scheele
- Hieracium glaucoprasinum Dahlst.
- Hieracium glaucopsis Gren.
- Hieracium glaucosaezii Mateo & Gómiz
- Hieracium glaucosarcum Omang
- Hieracium glaucoscense Mateo
- Hieracium glaucovatum Omang
- Hieracium glaucum All.
- Hieracium glavaerense Omang
- Hieracium glehnii Üksip
- Hieracium glevense (Pugsley) P.D.Sell & C.West
- Hieracium glischrophyes Omang
- Hieracium globiceps Dahlst.
- Hieracium globiferum Norrl.
- Hieracium globosiflorum Pugsley
- Hieracium glochinolepis Omang
- Hieracium glorioanum Mateo, Egido & Gómiz
- Hieracium glossodes Dahlst.
- Hieracium glottarium Elfstr. ex Omang
- Hieracium gnaphalocladum Brenner
- Hieracium gnilagredae Zahn
- Hieracium gombense Lagger ex Christen.
- Hieracium gomezianum Mateo
- Hieracium gomizii Mateo & Egido
- Hieracium goniophyllum Omang
- Hieracium gorczakovskii Schljakov
- Hieracium gordonense Mateo & Egido
- Hieracium gorfenianum Bornm. & Zahn
- Hieracium gorodkovianum Üksip
- Hieracium gosolianum Mateo, Egido & Gómiz
- Hieracium gothicianfractum Johanss. & Sam.
- Hieracium gothiciferum (Ohlsén) T.E.Nilsson & T.Tyler
- Hieracium gothicograellsianum ides Pugsley
- Hieracium gouanii Arv.-Touv.
- Hieracium gracilens Brenner
- Hieracium gracilentiforme Norrl.
- Hieracium gracilentipes (Dahlst. ex Zahn) Notø
- Hieracium gracilidens Wiinst.
- Hieracium gracilifolium (F.Hanb.) Pugsley
- Hieracium gracilifurcum Zahn
- Hieracium gracilipes (Dahlst.) Prain
- Hieracium gracillimum Dahlst.
- Hieracium graecum Boiss. & Heldr.
- Hieracium graellsianum Arv.-Touv. & Gaut.
- Hieracium graminellum Omang
- Hieracium gramineticola Norrl.
- Hieracium gramosicum Gottschl. & Dunkel
- Hieracium grampianum P.D.Sell
- Hieracium grandescens (Dahlst. ex Zahn) Johanss. & Sam.
- Hieracium grandiceps P.D.Sell
- Hieracium grandiculum Omang
- Hieracium grandidentiforme Hyl.
- Hieracium grandifoliatum Dahlst.
- Hieracium grandifolium Sch.Bip.
- Hieracium grandiserratum Hyl.
- Hieracium graniticola W.R.Linton
- Hieracium granvicum Üksip
- Hieracium gratiosum Wiinst.
- Hieracium gratum P.D.Sell & C.West
- Hieracium gravastelloides Notø
- Hieracium grecescui Nyár. & Zahn
- Hieracium gredense Rouy
- Hieracium greenei A.Gray
- Hieracium gregorii-bakurianii S.Bräut.
- Hieracium greuteri Gottschl.
- Hieracium griffithii (F.Hanb.) F.Hanb.
- Hieracium gripharium Johanss.
- Hieracium griphodes (Dahlst. ex Zahn) Dahlst. ex Johanss.
- Hieracium grisedalense McCosh
- Hieracium griseolum Brenner
- Hieracium griseovirens Brenner
- Hieracium groentvedii Ósk.
- Hieracium groevelense Elfstr.
- Hieracium grofae Woł.
- Hieracium × grohii Lepage
- Hieracium gronovii L.
- Hieracium grophosiceps Johanss. ex Folin
- Hieracium grophosum Johanss.
- Hieracium grossianum Zahn
- Hieracium grossicephalum Gottschl., Brandst. & Dunkel
- Hieracium grothii T.E.Nilsson
- Hieracium grovesianum Arv.-Touv. ex Belli
- Hieracium grovesii Pugsley
- Hieracium guadalopinum Mateo
- Hieracium guadarramense Arv.-Touv.
- Hieracium guaranum Arv.-Touv. & Gaut.
- Hieracium guatemalense Standl. & Steyerm.
- Hieracium gudaricum Mateo
- Hieracium gudbergii Enander
- Hieracium gudbrandii
- Hieracium guentheri Norrl.
- Hieracium guentheri-beckii Zahn
- Hieracium guglerianum Zahn
- Hieracium guilielmi Johanss. & Sam.
- Hieracium guldbergense Folin ex T.Tyler
- Hieracium gulldalense Norrl.
- Hieracium gunnarii (Zahn) Johanss.
- Hieracium gusinjense Scheffer & Zahn
- Hieracium gussevii Szeląg
- Hieracium guttatifrons Hyl.
- Hieracium guzmantaranum Mateo & Egido
- Hieracium gymnerosulum Mateo
- Hieracium gymnocephalum Griseb. ex Pant.
- Hieracium gymnocerinthe Arv.-Touv. & Gaut.
- Hieracium gymnonotolepis Omang
- Hieracium gynaeconesaeum Üksip
- Hieracium gyndelense Notø
- Hieracium gypsophilum B.L.Turner

== H ==
- Hieracium habitius Johanss.
- Hieracium haboense (Johanss. & Sam.) Johanss. & Sam.
- Hieracium habrodon Ósk.
- Hieracium hadrocephalum Omang
- Hieracium hadromeriforme Norrl.
- Hieracium hadrophyton Omang
- Hieracium haegerstroemii Dahlst. ex Sam.
- Hieracium haemophaeum Omang
- Hieracium haeverense Johanss.
- Hieracium hafstroendense Ósk.
- Hieracium haglundii Dahlst.
- Hieracium halfdanii Ósk.
- Hieracium halsicum Dahlst.
- Hieracium hamigerum Omang
- Hieracium hamulatum Omang
- Hieracium hamulosum Brenner
- Hieracium hanburyi Pugsley
- Hieracium handoelense Dahlst.
- Hieracium hangvarense T.Tyler
- Hieracium haplophyes Omang
- Hieracium haploplastum Omang
- Hieracium haploschemon (Omang) Omang
- Hieracium haplotetodes Omang
- Hieracium haploum Omang
- Hieracium hardangerense Omang
- Hieracium harjuense Sennikov
- Hieracium hartii (F.Hanb.) P.D.Sell & C.West
- Hieracium hartzianum Dahlst.
- Hieracium harzianum Zahn
- Hieracium hastato-ovatum Hyl.
- Hieracium hastatulum Elfstr.
- Hieracium hasticum Johanss.
- Hieracium hastiforme P.D.Sell & C.West
- Hieracium hastile Arv.-Touv. & Gaut.
- Hieracium haussknechtianum Zahn
- Hieracium hauthalianum Zahn
- Hieracium hayekii
- Hieracium hebetatoides Notø
- Hieracium hebridense Pugsley
- Hieracium hedymorphum Omang
- Hieracium heldreichii Boiss.
- Hieracium helenae T.Tyler
- Hieracium heliomorphum Brenner
- Hieracium helsingicum Almq. ex Johanss.
- Hieracium hemichlorum Norrl.
- Hieracium hemidiaphanum (Dahlst.) Brenner
- Hieracium hemimaculatum T.Tyler
- Hieracium hemipsilum Brenner
- Hieracium hepaticiforme Johanss. & Sam.
- Hieracium hepaticolor (Stenstr.) Johanss. & Sam.
- Hieracium hepaticum (Lindeb.) Norrl.
- Hieracium hepatiphyllum Notø
- Hieracium hercegovinicum Freyn
- Hieracium hermanni-zahnii Zahn
- Hieracium herrerae S.F.Blake
- Hieracium herttulense Norrl.
- Hieracium herzogianum Beauverd ex Sleumer
- Hieracium hesperium P.D.Sell
- Hieracium hessonethes Omang
- Hieracium hessonophyes Omang
- Hieracium heteradenum Arv.-Touv. & Cadevall
- Hieracium heterodontum (Adlerz) Johanss. & Sam.
- Hieracium heterogynum (Froel.) Gutermann
- Hieracium hethlandiae (F.Hanb.) Pugsley
- Hieracium hians Johanss. & Sam.
- Hieracium hibernicum F.Hanb.
- Hieracium hieronymi Zahn
- Hieracium hilare (Dahlst. ex Omang) T.Tyler
- Hieracium hilariense Mateo
- Hieracium hilarulum Norrl.
- Hieracium hintonii Beaman ex McVaugh
- Hieracium hirsuticaule Schljakov
- Hieracium hirsutum Tausch
- Hieracium hirtellifolium Note
- Hieracium hirtellosum Omang
- Hieracium hirtellum Lindeb.
- Hieracium hirticollum Arv.-Touv.
- Hieracium hirtiusculum Omang
- Hieracium hirtonargonense Mateo, Egido & Gómiz
- Hieracium hispanicum Arv.-Touv.
- Hieracium hispanobifidum Mateo
- Hieracium hispidiceps Dahlst.
- Hieracium hispidosum Dahlst. ex T.Tyler
- Hieracium hispidulum Arv.-Touv.
- Hieracium hjeltii Norrl.
- Hieracium hogdalense (Dahlst. ex Zahn) Dahlst. ex Johanss.
- Hieracium hoidalicum (Omang) Omang
- Hieracium holopetalum Omang
- Hieracium holophyllodes Brenner
- Hieracium holophyllum W.R.Linton
- Hieracium holopleuroides (Dahlst.) Omang
- Hieracium holopleurophyllum Ósk.
- Hieracium holopleurum Dahlst. ex Johanss.
- Hieracium holosericeum Backh.f.
- Hieracium holospadophyllum Omang
- Hieracium holostenophyllum Omang
- Hieracium homalodermum Johanss.
- Hieracium homochroum Norrl. ex Schljakov
- Hieracium homoeodontum (Dahlst. ex Zahn) Dahlst. ex Johanss.
- Hieracium homoglossum Brenner
- Hieracium homophyllum Wiinst.
- Hieracium homoptum Norrl.
- Hieracium horridum Fr.
- Hieracium hortense Hyl.
- Hieracium hosjense Schljakov
- Hieracium hozense Mateo
- Hieracium hraunense Omang
- Hieracium huetianum Arv.-Touv.
- Hieracium huetii Timb.-Lagr. ex Rouy
- Hieracium hugeliense Dahlst.
- Hieracium humadense Mateo, Egido & Alejandre
- Hieracium humidiceps Notø
- Hieracium humidorifolium Note
- Hieracium humidorum (Almq. ex Elfstr.) Dahlst.
- Hieracium humile Jacq.
- Hieracium humiliceps Folin
- Hieracium humilipes Norrl.
- Hieracium hyalinellum Brenner
- Hieracium hyalinum Brenner
- Hieracium hygrophilum Dahlst.
- Hieracium hylocomum Üksip
- Hieracium hyocomium Ósk.
- Hieracium hyparcticoides Pugsley ex P.D.Sell
- Hieracium hypastrum Zahn
- Hieracium hyperadenium Brenner
- Hieracium hyperlepideum Johanss.
- Hieracium hyperleptum Omang
- Hieracium hypochnoodes Dahlst.
- Hieracium hypochoeroides S.Gibson
- Hieracium hypogymnum Brenner
- Hieracium hypoleontodon Arv.-Touv. & Gaut.
- Hieracium hypoleptolepis Ósk.
- Hieracium hypoleurites Norrl.
- Hieracium hypomallum Hyl.
- Hieracium hypophalacrum P.D.Sell
- Hieracium hypoprasinum (Dahlst. ex Zahn) Dahlst. ex Johanss.
- Hieracium hypotrachynum Norrl.
- Hieracium hypselodes Omang
- Hieracium hypselophyes (Dahlst. ex Zahn) Dahlst. ex Johanss.
- Hieracium hypsilophum Johanss.
- Hieracium hystrix T.Tyler

== I ==
- Hieracium iberomaculatum Mateo & Egido
- Hieracium idicopum Omang
- Hieracium idiotropum Omang
- Hieracium idubedae Mateo
- Hieracium igoschinae Üksip
- Hieracium ihrowyszczense (Zahn) Schljakov
- Hieracium illimitum Norrl.
- Hieracium illyricopsis Gottschl.
- Hieracium imandricola Schljakov
- Hieracium imberbe Hyl.
- Hieracium imbricatiforme Johanss. & Sam.
- Hieracium imbricatum Lindeb.
- Hieracium immarginatum Brenner
- Hieracium immergens Norrl.
- Hieracium immodestum Greuter
- Hieracium imparile Omang
- Hieracium implicatum Notø
- Hieracium implume Johanss. & Sam.
- Hieracium impressiforme (Dahlst.) Dahlst.
- Hieracium improvisum Norrl.
- Hieracium impunctatum Norrl.
- Hieracium inaequidens (Dahlst. ex Zahn) Dahlst. ex Johanss.
- Hieracium inaequilaterum P.D.Sell
- Hieracium inauratum Norrl.
- Hieracium incanescens Brenner
- Hieracium incisiceps Rohlena & Zahn
- Hieracium incisionum Elfstr.
- Hieracium inclinatellum Notø
- Hieracium includens Dahlst.
- Hieracium incomptum Norrl.
- Hieracium inconspicuissimum Greuter
- Hieracium inconspicuum Norrl.
- Hieracium inconstrictum Brenner
- Hieracium inconveniens Üksip
- Hieracium incrassans Dahlst. ex Johanss.
- Hieracium incretum Notø
- Hieracium incurrens Saelan ex Norrl.
- Hieracium incurvum Notø
- Hieracium inductum Norrl.
- Hieracium induticeps (Adlerz) Dahlst.
- Hieracium indutiforme Dahlst. ex Notø
- Hieracium inflatum Brenner
- Hieracium inflectens Norrl.
- Hieracium inflexum Norrl.
- Hieracium informe Stenstr. ex Dahlst.
- Hieracium infravillosulum Sleumer
- Hieracium infularium Johanss.
- Hieracium infumatum Johanss.
- Hieracium ingolfii Ósk.
- Hieracium iniquilobum Omang
- Hieracium inlingulatum Elfstr.
- Hieracium innatum Notø
- Hieracium inophyllum Johanss. & Sam.
- Hieracium inopifolium Johanss.
- Hieracium inquilinum Ohlsén
- Hieracium inscendens Norrl.
- Hieracium insequens Norrl.
- Hieracium insertum Ohlsén
- Hieracium insigne
- Hieracium inspicatum Omang
- Hieracium inspissatum P.D.Sell
- Hieracium inspurcum Dahlst. ex Omang
- Hieracium insubricum Gottschl.
- Hieracium insuccatum Johanss.
- Hieracium insulare (F.Hanb.) F.Hanb.
- Hieracium insulicola Schljakov
- Hieracium integratifrons Johanss.
- Hieracium integratulum Omang
- Hieracium integrifrons Ósk.
- Hieracium integrilaterum (Dahlst.) Omang
- Hieracium intercalatum Johanss.
- Hieracium intercedens Hyl.
- Hieracium intercessum Üksip
- Hieracium intercurrens Notø
- Hieracium interlucens Johanss. & Sam.
- Hieracium intermarginatum Johanss. & Sam.
- Hieracium intermixtum Brenner
- Hieracium internatum Brenner
- Hieracium interrogans Brenner
- Hieracium interruptiflorens Omang
- Hieracium intertextum Arv.-Touv.
- Hieracium interveniens (Dahlst.) Dahlst.
- Hieracium intolerans Folin
- Hieracium intonsum Zahn
- Hieracium intumescens Nägeli & Peter
- Hieracium inuliflorum Arv.-Touv. & Gaut.
- Hieracium inulifrons Sennikov
- Hieracium inuloides Tausch
- Hieracium invenustum Omang
- Hieracium inversum Brenner
- Hieracium involutiforme (Dahlst. ex Zahn) Dahlst. ex Johanss.
- Hieracium involutum Dahlst. ex Johanss.
- Hieracium ionthadium Omang
- Hieracium irasuense Benth.
- Hieracium iratianum Mateo & Egido
- Hieracium iremelense Üksip
- Hieracium iricum Fr.
- Hieracium irkutense Tupitz.
- Hieracium irmae T.Tyler
- Hieracium irregularidens P.D.Sell
- Hieracium irroratum Norrl.
- Hieracium irrugans Johanss.
- Hieracium isabellae E.S.Marshall
- Hieracium isatifolium Arv.-Touv.
- Hieracium isolanum Zahn
- Hieracium isomeles Omang
- Hieracium isonomoum Johanss. & Sam.
- Hieracium isopicinum Notø
- Hieracium isopleurum Johanss.
- Hieracium isorigidum Notø
- Hieracium issatchenkoi Schljakov
- Hieracium issenii Hyl.
- Hieracium isthmium Elfstr. ex Omang
- Hieracium italianum Arrigoni & E.Nardi
- Hieracium itamodon Omang
- Hieracium iteophyllum Greuter
- Hieracium itharophyton Johanss.
- Hieracium ithytomum Johanss. & Sam.
- Hieracium itunense Pugsley
- Hieracium ivdelense Schljakov
- Hieracium ixalodon Omang

== J ==
- Hieracium jablonicense Woł.
- Hieracium jaculifolium (F.Hanb.) Roffey
- Hieracium jaedrense Johanss.
- Hieracium jaeredense Johanss. & Sam.
- Hieracium jaervikylae Norrl. & H.Lindb.
- Hieracium jaervikylense Norrl. & H.Lindb.
- Hieracium jahandiezii (Zahn ex Jahand. & Maire) Dobignard
- Hieracium jangajuense Üksip
- Hieracium jankae R.Uechtr.
- Hieracium jankolympicum Gottschl. & Dunkel
- Hieracium japonicum Franch. & Sav.
- Hieracium jaretanum (Zahn) Sleumer
- Hieracium jarzabczynum (Pawł. & Zahn) Mráz & Chrtek f.
- Hieracium jasiewiczii Szeląg
- Hieracium jaworowae (Zahn) Schljakov
- Hieracium jebei Omang
- Hieracium jebronense Johanss.
- Hieracium jersoeense Norrl. & Palmgr.
- Hieracium joannis Szeląg
- Hieracium johanssonii (Dahlst.) Johanss. & Sam.
- Hieracium jolubei Mateo
- Hieracium jonassonii Ósk.
- Hieracium jonesianum McCosh
- Hieracium jordanii Arv.-Touv.
- Hieracium jubaticeps Behr & Zahn
- Hieracium jubatum Fr.
- Hieracium jucundum Notø
- Hieracium juelii (Dahlst.) Johanss. & Sam.
- Hieracium juengeri Gottschl.
- Hieracium juncinescens Johanss.
- Hieracium junciniforme Johanss.
- Hieracium juranomorphum Zahn
- Hieracium juranum Rapin
- Hieracium jurassicum Griseb.
- Hieracium juratzkae Zahn
- Hieracium jutlandicum Wiinst.

== K ==
- Hieracium kabanovii Üksip
- Hieracium kablikianum Zlatník
- Hieracium kaczurinii Üksip
- Hieracium kaerkoeense Norrl.
- Hieracium kaeserianum Zahn
- Hieracium kaldalonense Dahlst.
- Hieracium kalsianum Huter ex Nageli & Peter
- Hieracium kalsoense Dahlst.
- Hieracium kandalakschae Schljakov
- Hieracium kandawanicum (Rech.f. & Zahn) Rech.f.
- Hieracium kaninense Schljakov
- Hieracium karaulanum (O.Behr) Niketić
- Hieracium karelorum (Norrl.) Norrl.
- Hieracium kavinae Zlatník
- Hieracium keldii Wiinst.
- Hieracium kemense Norrl.
- Hieracium kemiticum (Norrl.) Brenner
- Hieracium kennethii P.D.Sell & D.J.Tennant
- Hieracium kentii P.D.Sell
- Hieracium khekianum Zahn
- Hieracium kieslingii Cabrera
- Hieracium kievejense Schljakov
- Hieracium kildinense Schljakov
- Hieracium kingshousense P.D.Sell
- Hieracium kinkellense McCosh
- Hieracium kinnense Omang
- Hieracium kinrossense McCosh
- Hieracium kintrawense McCosh
- Hieracium kintyricum P.D.Sell
- Hieracium kirghisorum Üksip
- Hieracium kiviniemense Norrl.
- Hieracium klingrahoolense W.Scott & R.C.Palmer
- Hieracium klingstedtii Palmgr. & Fagerstr.
- Hieracium klisurae Zahn ex Urum.
- Hieracium kneissaeum Mouterde
- Hieracium knuthianum Pax
- Hieracium kochianum Jord.
- Hieracium koehleri (Dahlst. ex Zahn) Dahlst.
- Hieracium koepingense Johanss.
- Hieracium kofelicum Gottschl.
- Hieracium kolgujevense Schljakov
- Hieracium kopsicum Gottschl.
- Hieracium korshinskyi Zahn
- Hieracium kosmoicum Note
- Hieracium kosvinskiense Üksip
- Hieracium kotilainenii Fagerstr.
- Hieracium krasanii Woł.
- Hieracium kritschimanum Mattf. & Zahn
- Hieracium krivanense (Woł. & Zahn) Schljakov
- Hieracium krizsnae Lengyel & Zahn
- Hieracium krylovii Nevski ex Schljakov
- Hieracium kubinskense Üksip
- Hieracium kuhmoniemiense Norrl.
- Hieracium kulkowianum (Zahn) Üksip
- Hieracium kultukense Sergievsk. & Üksip
- Hieracium kupfferi Dahlst.
- Hieracium kuroksarense Üksip
- Hieracium kusnetzkiense Schischk. & Serg.
- Hieracium kuzenevae Üksip
- Hieracium kvaenangense Dahlst. ex Notø

== L ==
- Hieracium lacerabile Johanss.
- Hieracium lacerifolium Almq. ex Stenstr.
- Hieracium lachenalii Suter
- Hieracium lachnaeilepium Omang
- Hieracium lachnaeum Omang
- Hieracium lachnopsilon Arv.-Touv.
- Hieracium lacinifolium V.Jones ex McCosh, D.Barlow, B.Burrow & T.C.G.Rich
- Hieracium lacistoides Notø
- Hieracium lacistophylloides Dahlst. ex Notø
- Hieracium lackschewitzii (Dahlst.) Prain
- Hieracium laestadianum Johanss. & Sam.
- Hieracium laesulum Notø
- Hieracium laetellum Notø
- Hieracium laeticeps Dahlst.
- Hieracium laetificum P.D.Sell & C.West
- Hieracium laetifolium (Dahlst. ex Zahn) Dahlst. ex Johanss. & Sam.
- Hieracium laetifrons Notø
- Hieracium laetilanosum Brenner
- Hieracium laetilingua Brenner
- Hieracium laevigatum Willd.
- Hieracium laevigodentatum Mateo
- Hieracium laevimarginatum Sennikov
- Hieracium lagascanum Arv.-Touv. & Gaut.
- Hieracium lagganense P.D.Sell
- Hieracium lagophyton (Notø) Omang
- Hieracium lagopoideum Brenner
- Hieracium lagopus D.Don
- Hieracium lainzii de Retz
- Hieracium lakelandicum P.D.Sell
- Hieracium lamprochlorum Omang
- Hieracium lamprodes Dahlst.
- Hieracium lamprophylloides (Dahlst. ex Notø) Omang
- Hieracium lamprophyllum Scheele
- Hieracium lamprotrichum Brenner
- Hieracium lanarium Elfstr. ex Omang
- Hieracium lanatissimum Mateo
- Hieracium lanatonargonense Mateo
- Hieracium lanceatum Schljakov
- Hieracium lancigerum Norrl.
- Hieracium lancinatum (Johanss.) B.Nord.
- Hieracium lancipalentinum Mateo, Egido & Gómiz
- Hieracium landmarkii Omang
- Hieracium langei Fr.
- Hieracium languidum Notø
- Hieracium langwellense F.Hanb.
- Hieracium laniferum Cav.
- Hieracium lanipes Brenner
- Hieracium lannesianum Arv.-Touv.
- Hieracium lanseanum Arv.-Touv.
- Hieracium lanugineum Brenner
- Hieracium lanuiceps Brenner
- Hieracium lapponicifolium Schljakov
- Hieracium lapponicum Fr.
- Hieracium larigense (Pugsley) P.D.Sell & C.West
- Hieracium larsii-levii T.Tyler
- Hieracium larssonii Johanss. & Sam.
- Hieracium larvatum Omang
- Hieracium lasiocybe Dahlst. ex Notø
- Hieracium lasiophyton Omang
- Hieracium latecardoanum Mateo, L.Sáez, Egido & Gómiz
- Hieracium latemixtum Mateo & Alejandre
- Hieracium latens Üksip
- Hieracium lateovatum Folin
- Hieracium latequeraltense Mateo, Egido & Gómez
- Hieracium laterale Norrl.
- Hieracium lateriflorum Norrl.
- Hieracium latidens Folin
- Hieracium latificum Omang
- Hieracium latifrons Omang
- Hieracium latilepidotum Gottschl.
- Hieracium latilineatum Johanss.
- Hieracium latypeum Norrl.
- Hieracium laurae Norrl.
- Hieracium laurenii Brenner
- Hieracium lavatum Norrl.
- Hieracium lawsonii Vill.
- Hieracium lawsonioides Mateo
- Hieracium laxifloccum Folin
- Hieracium laxilimbatum Hyl.
- Hieracium laxiramum Notø
- Hieracium lazicum Boiss. & Balansa
- Hieracium lazistanum Arv.-Touv.
- Hieracium lecanodes Omang
- Hieracium lecithodes (Dahlst. ex Zahn) Dahlst. ex Johanss.
- Hieracium legionense Coss. ex Willk.
- Hieracium legiosabaudum Mateo & Egido
- Hieracium legnodes (Dahlst. ex Zahn) Dahlst. ex Johanss.
- Hieracium legrandianum Arv.-Touv.
- Hieracium lehbertii (Zahn) Üksip
- Hieracium leioalejandrei Mateo, Egido & Alejandre
- Hieracium leiocephalum Bartl. ex Griseb.
- Hieracium leiocranum (Sam. ex Zahn) Sam.
- Hieracium leiophaeum
- Hieracium leiophanoides Dahlst. ex Notø
- Hieracium leiophyllum Omang
- Hieracium leiopogon Gren. ex Verl.
- Hieracium leiopsis Dahlst. ex Omang
- Hieracium lembifolium Notø
- Hieracium lene Notø
- Hieracium lepidellum Omang
- Hieracium lepidiforme (Zahn) Johanss.
- Hieracium lepidolytes Omang
- Hieracium lepidotum Stenstr. ex Dahlst.
- Hieracium lepiduloides McCosh
- Hieracium lepidulum Stenstr. ex Dahlst.
- Hieracium leprolepis Norrl.
- Hieracium leptacrum Brenner
- Hieracium lepthanthelum Dahlst. ex Notø
- Hieracium leptocarenum Dahlst. ex Notø
- Hieracium leptocephalum Benth.
- Hieracium leptochlaenum Omang
- Hieracium leptoclonum Omang
- Hieracium leptodon P.D.Sell & D.J.Tennant
- Hieracium leptoglochin Dahlst. ex Notø
- Hieracium leptoglossum (Dahlst. ex Elfstr.) Dahlst.
- Hieracium leptogrammum Dahlst. ex Johanss.
- Hieracium leptolygum Omang
- Hieracium leptomeres (Dahlst. ex Zahn) Dahlst. ex Johanss.
- Hieracium leptopholis Schljakov
- Hieracium leptophyes Omang
- Hieracium leptopodum Brenner
- Hieracium leptoprenanthes Litv. & Zahn
- Hieracium leptopsis Omang
- Hieracium leptotes Dahlst.
- Hieracium leptum Johanss. & Sam.
- Hieracium lesimanum Gottschl. & S.Orsenigo
- Hieracium letiohortense Mateo, Egido & Gómiz
- Hieracium leucaeolum Omang
- Hieracium leuciscum Omang
- Hieracium leucocestum Omang
- Hieracium leucochaetum Brenner
- Hieracium leucoclonum Ósk.
- Hieracium leucocybe Omang
- Hieracium leucodaedalum (Dahlst. ex Zahn) Dahlst. ex Johanss. & Sam.
- Hieracium leucodetum Omang
- Hieracium leucofarreatum Notø
- Hieracium leucograptum Dahlst.
- Hieracium leucolegnodes Omang
- Hieracium leucolividuliforme Notø
- Hieracium leucoloma Brenner
- Hieracium leucomalanides Omang
- Hieracium leucomalloides Ósk.
- Hieracium leucomallum (Dahlst.) Dahlst.
- Hieracium leucopelmatum Nägeli & Peter
- Hieracium leucophaeatum Notø
- Hieracium leucophaeum Gren.
- Hieracium leucopilotum Omang
- Hieracium leucopithodes Omang
- Hieracium leucoplethum Omang
- Hieracium leucops Omang
- Hieracium leucopterum Brenner
- Hieracium leucotaenioides Dahlst. ex Notø
- Hieracium leucotrachelum Johanss.
- Hieracium leucotrigonum Omang
- Hieracium leucotrophum Omang
- Hieracium leucozum Omang
- Hieracium leucurolepium (Dahlst. & Enander ex Zahn) Dahlst. & Enander ex Johanss.
- Hieracium leurolonchum Johanss. & Sam.
- Hieracium levicaule Jord.
- Hieracium levicilians Omang
- Hieracium leviculum Omang
- Hieracium leviforme Omang
- Hieracium levihirtum Omang
- Hieracium leyanum (Zahn) Roffey
- Hieracium leyi F.Hanb.
- Hieracium lignyotum Norrl.
- Hieracium ligulellum Elfstr.
- Hieracium lilacinum Norrl.
- Hieracium liljeholmii (Dahlst. ex Zahn) Dahlst.
- Hieracium limatum Omang
- Hieracium limbatum Brenner
- Hieracium limbifloccum Hyl.
- Hieracium limbigerum Omang
- Hieracium limbolariceps Omang
- Hieracium limbolarium Omang
- Hieracium limburgense (Zahn) Haveman
- Hieracium limitaneum (Johanss.) T.Tyler
- Hieracium linahamariense Üksip
- Hieracium linarense Mateo & Gómiz
- Hieracium lindebergii (Nyman) Dahlst.
- Hieracium lindii Wiinst.
- Hieracium linearisquameum Brenner
- Hieracium linearium Brenner
- Hieracium lineaticeps Nord.
- Hieracium lineolatum Dahlst. ex Johanss.
- Hieracium lingelsheimii
- Hieracium lingua Dahlst. ex Johanss.
- Hieracium linguaememorans Folin
- Hieracium linguans (Zahn) Roffey
- Hieracium linguifolium Arv.-Touv.
- Hieracium linguiforme Dahlst. ex Johanss.
- Hieracium lingulatum Backh.f. ex Hook. & Arn.
- Hieracium linifolium Saelan ex Lindeb.
- Hieracium lintonense McCosh
- Hieracium lintonii Ley
- Hieracium lipadenium Omang
- Hieracium lipochnoides Omang
- Hieracium lipochnoum Omang
- Hieracium lipomnoum Johanss. & Sam.
- Hieracium lipotrichum Omang
- Hieracium lippmaa Üksip
- Hieracium liptoviense Borbás
- Hieracium lissodermum (Dahlst. ex Zahn) Dahlst. ex Johanss.
- Hieracium lissoglaucum Omang
- Hieracium lissophyton Omang
- Hieracium lissoterum Omang
- Hieracium listrophyllum Elfstr. ex Omang
- Hieracium listrotum Johanss.
- Hieracium lithophilon Omang
- Hieracium litorale Schljakov
- Hieracium litwinowianum Zahn
- Hieracium livescens Norrl.
- Hieracium livescentiforme Schljakov
- Hieracium lividicaule Norrl.
- Hieracium lividorubens (Almq.) Elfstr.
- Hieracium lividulifolium Johanss.
- Hieracium lividum Arv.-Touv.
- Hieracium ljapinense Üksip
- Hieracium lobetanicum Mateo, Egido & Gómiz
- Hieracium lobomischodes Omang
- Hieracium lobophyllum Dahlst.
- Hieracium lobotocum Omang
- Hieracium lobulare Omang
- Hieracium loedingense Notø
- Hieracium loeflingianum Arv.-Touv. & Gaut.
- Hieracium loennbohmii Norrl.
- Hieracium lomnicense Woł.
- Hieracium lomostephum Omang
- Hieracium lonchophyllum Schljakov
- Hieracium longiberbe Howell
- Hieracium longicollum (Dahlst. ex Zahn) Johanss. & Sam.
- Hieracium longicuspis Brenner
- Hieracium longidens Ohlsén
- Hieracium longifidum Zahn
- Hieracium longifolium Hornem.
- Hieracium longifrons Dahlst.
- Hieracium longiglandulosum Brenner
- Hieracium longilobum (Zahn) Roffey
- Hieracium longimanum (Norrl.) Dahlst.
- Hieracium longipilipes Ósk.
- Hieracium longipilum Torr. ex Hook.
- Hieracium longipubens Schljakov
- Hieracium longiradium Norrl.
- Hieracium longulifrons Omang
- Hieracium lopholepidioides Omang
- Hieracium lophophyllum Dahlst. ex Johanss.
- Hieracium lorentzianum Zahn
- Hieracium loretii Rouy
- Hieracium loriferum Johanss.
- Hieracium losae Pau ex Mateo
- Hieracium loscosianum Scheele
- Hieracium lotense Omang
- Hieracium lovozericum Schljakov
- Hieracium lucens Norrl.
- Hieracium lucidum Guss.
- Hieracium luculentorum T.Tyler
- Hieracium luculentum Omang
- Hieracium ludificans Johanss.
- Hieracium ludoviciense Johanss.
- Hieracium luebeckii (Dahlst.) Dahlst. ex Johanss.
- Hieracium lugae-pljussae Sennikov
- Hieracium lugiorum (Zahn) Schljakov
- Hieracium lugubre (Malme) Dahlst.
- Hieracium luguerense Mateo, Egido & Alejandre
- Hieracium lundbomii Dahlst.
- Hieracium luridipes Norrl.
- Hieracium luroense Omang
- Hieracium lusitanicum Arv.-Touv.
- Hieracium luteomontanum Cabrera
- Hieracium lutnjaermense Schljakov
- Hieracium lutulenticeps Schljakov
- Hieracium luxurians Wiinst.
- Hieracium luzuleti Hyl.
- Hieracium lychnidifolium Elfstr.
- Hieracium lychnioides Arv.-Touv.
- Hieracium lychnitis Scheele
- Hieracium lycopifolium Froel.
- Hieracium lycopoides Arv.-Touv. & Gaut.
- Hieracium lygistodon Dahlst.
- Hieracium lyngenense Dahlst. ex Notø
- Hieracium lyratifolium H.Lindb. ex Norrl.
- Hieracium lyratiforme Norrl.
- Hieracium lyrifolium Schljakov
- Hieracium lysanum Arv.-Touv. & Gaut.
- Hieracium lythrodes Dahlst. ex Omang

== M ==
- Hieracium maccoshiana T.C.G.Rich
- Hieracium macdonaldii Beaman & B.L.Turner
- Hieracium macednophyton Omang
- Hieracium macellum Johanss.
- Hieracium machairodon Johanss. & Sam.
- Hieracium maciatum Ohlsén
- Hieracium macradenium (Dahlst.) Brenner
- Hieracium macrelliforme Omang
- Hieracium macrellum Omang
- Hieracium macripes Omang
- Hieracium macroauricula H.Lindb.
- Hieracium macrocalyx Brenner
- Hieracium macrocarpum Pugsley
- Hieracium macrocentrum (Johanss.) Johanss.
- Hieracium macrocephalum Huter ex Dalla Torre
- Hieracium macrochlorellum Litv. & Zahn ex Üksip
- Hieracium macrocladum Schljakov
- Hieracium macrocoelium Johanss.
- Hieracium macrocomum Dahlst.
- Hieracium macroconoides Johanss.
- Hieracium macrodon Nägeli & Peter
- Hieracium macrodontoides (Zahn) Zahn
- Hieracium macrodontophyllum (Soest & Zahn) Haveman
- Hieracium macrogrovesianum Gottschl.
- Hieracium macrolasium Ósk.
- Hieracium macromalloides Sam.
- Hieracium macromallum Dahlst. ex Johanss.
- Hieracium macromeles Omang
- Hieracium macropholidium (Dahlst.) Dahlst.
- Hieracium macropodum Omang
- Hieracium macropterum Omang
- Hieracium macrostylum Dahlst.
- Hieracium macrotonoides (Dahlst. ex Zahn) Dahlst. ex Johanss.
- Hieracium macrurum Hyl.
- Hieracium maculato-ornatum T.Tyler
- Hieracium maculatum Schrank
- Hieracium maculiferum (Norrl.) Dahlst.
- Hieracium maculoides P.D.Sell & C.West
- Hieracium madarodes Dahlst. ex Johanss.
- Hieracium maeandrinum Johanss. & Sam.
- Hieracium maesticolor Johanss.
- Hieracium magellanicum Sch.Bip.
- Hieracium magnidens Dahlst. ex Johanss.
- Hieracium majorcanum Arv.-Touv.
- Hieracium majorinum Johanss. & Sam.
- Hieracium malacophyllum Ohlsén
- Hieracium maladettae Arv.-Touv. & Gaut.
- Hieracium malaxatiforme Johanss. & Sam.
- Hieracium malaxatum Johanss. & Sam.
- Hieracium mallocaulon (Dahlst. ex Zahn) Dahlst. ex Johanss.
- Hieracium mallophyllum Johanss.
- Hieracium mallopodoides Johanss. & Sam.
- Hieracium mallopodum Johanss.
- Hieracium malmioi Nord.
- Hieracium malovanicum Degen & Zahn
- Hieracium mammatidens Folin
- Hieracium mammidens P.D.Sell
- Hieracium manadenium Omang
- Hieracium mandonii (Sch.Bip.) Britton
- Hieracium manifestum Üksip
- Hieracium mankholmense Norrl.
- Hieracium manocola Johanss. & Sam.
- Hieracium manophyton Omang
- Hieracium manotrichum Johanss.
- Hieracium manozum Omang
- Hieracium mansanetianum Mateo
- Hieracium mansum Elfstr. ex Omang
- Hieracium manubricatum (Dahlst. & Enander ex Zahn) Dahlst. & Enander ex Johanss.
- Hieracium mapirense Britton
- Hieracium maranzae (Murr & Zahn) Prain
- Hieracium × marcetii Pau ex Marcet
- Hieracium marchesonii Gottschl.
- Hieracium marginatulum Norrl.
- Hieracium marginellum Dahlst. ex Stenstr.
- Hieracium marginifloccum Folin
- Hieracium mariae P.D.Sell
- Hieracium × marianum Willd.
- Hieracium marifugum Johanss.
- Hieracium mariniarum Mateo, Egido & Gómiz
- Hieracium marinum T.Tyler
- Hieracium maritimum (F.Hanb.) F.Hanb.
- Hieracium marjokense (Norrl.) Schljakov
- Hieracium marmoreum Pančić & Vis.
- Hieracium marshallii E.F.Linton
- Hieracium marsorum Gottschl.
- Hieracium martinetianum Mateo & Gómiz
- Hieracium mastrucatum Notø
- Hieracium mataeum Johanss. & Sam.
- Hieracium mattfeldianum Zahn
- Hieracium matthewsii Arv.-Touv.
- Hieracium mattiroloanum Arv.-Touv. & Belli
- Hieracium maurocephalum Folin
- Hieracium maurochlorum Norrl.
- Hieracium maurolepium Dahlst.
- Hieracium maurostylum Hyl.
- Hieracium mayoraliae Mateo
- Hieracium medense Gottschl. & Dunkel
- Hieracium mediiforme (G.O.Andersson) Dahlst.
- Hieracium medinense Mateo
- Hieracium mediolatum Omang
- Hieracium medschedsense Zahn
- Hieracium megabellense Mateo, Egido & Gómiz
- Hieracium megabelsetanum Mateo, Egido & Gómiz
- Hieracium megabombycinum Mateo
- Hieracium megacephalon Nash
- Hieracium megachaetum Wiinst.
- Hieracium megafurcatum Mateo & Egido
- Hieracium megalaniferum Mateo, Egido & Gómiz
- Hieracium megalanthelum Brenner
- Hieracium megalocaulon Ósk.
- Hieracium megalocerinthe Arv.-Touv.
- Hieracium megalochaetum Zahn
- Hieracium megalodon Dahlst. ex Johanss.
- Hieracium megalolepis Brenner
- Hieracium megalolepium Omang
- Hieracium megalomeres Omang
- Hieracium megalophyton Ósk.
- Hieracium megalops Omang
- Hieracium megalothecum Zahn
- Hieracium megalotrachelum Johanss.
- Hieracium meganargonense Mateo, Egido & Gómiz
- Hieracium megandurense Mateo, Egido & Gómiz
- Hieracium megapalentinum Mateo & Egido
- Hieracium megaphorum Omang
- Hieracium megaphyes Ósk.
- Hieracium megapodium Dahlst.
- Hieracium megardense Note
- Hieracium megasturicum Mateo & Egido
- Hieracium megavulgatum T.Tyler
- Hieracium megistadenium Elfstr.
- Hieracium meieces Omang
- Hieracium melainon Elfstr.
- Hieracium melampeplum Omang
- Hieracium melamphaes Omang
- Hieracium melamphorum Elfstr. ex Omang
- Hieracium melanadenium Dahlst.
- Hieracium melandetum Omang
- Hieracium melanochloricephalum Pugsley
- Hieracium melanocrinum Brenner
- Hieracium melanoglochin (E.F.Linton) P.D.Sell
- Hieracium melanomallum Dahlst.
- Hieracium melanops Arv.-Touv.
- Hieracium melanopum Omang
- Hieracium melanothyrsum K.Malý & Zahn
- Hieracium melanoxanthum Omang
- Hieracium melanthes (Dahlst. ex Zahn) Dahlst. ex Johanss.
- Hieracium melaxum Notø
- Hieracium melinostylum Johanss.
- Hieracium membrosum Johanss. & Sam.
- Hieracium memorabile P.D.Sell & C.West
- Hieracium mendocinum Sleumer
- Hieracium merakerense Norrl.
- Hieracium merxmuelleri de Retz
- Hieracium mesopoliotrichum Ohlsén
- Hieracium mesopolium Dahlst.
- Hieracium metaliceps Johanss. ex Dahlst.
- Hieracium metallicorum Gottschl.
- Hieracium metanobile Mateo, Egido & Gómiz
- Hieracium mexicanum Less.
- Hieracium miarellum Omang
- Hieracium micanticeps Johanss. & Sam.
- Hieracium micantiforme Notø
- Hieracium micantiramum Notø
- Hieracium miccylotocum Omang
- Hieracium micosiforme Johanss. & Sam.
- Hieracium micosum Johanss. & Sam.
- Hieracium micracladioides (Dahlst. ex Zahn) Dahlst. ex Johanss.
- Hieracium micracladium (F.N.Williams) Ley
- Hieracium microcephalum Sch.Bip.
- Hieracium microceps Notø
- Hieracium microcodon Hyl.
- Hieracium microcomum Dahlst. ex Svensson
- Hieracium microcymoides Johanss. & Sam.
- Hieracium microcymon Johanss.
- Hieracium microdon (Dahlst.) Dahlst.
- Hieracium microphoron (Norrl. ex Johanss.) Johanss.
- Hieracium microplacerum Norrl.
- Hieracium microstictum (Dahlst. & Enander ex Zahn) Dahlst. & Enander ex Johanss.
- Hieracium microtum Boiss.
- Hieracium milesii P.D.Sell & C.West
- Hieracium mimeticum Hyl.
- Hieracium minuriens Dahlst. ex Johanss.
- Hieracium miramarense (Almq. ex Dahlst.) Johanss.
- Hieracium mirandum P.D.Sell & C.West
- Hieracium misaucinum Nägeli & Peter
- Hieracium miserum Notø
- Hieracium mitigatum Omang
- Hieracium mitoclonum Omang
- Hieracium mixtibifidum Mateo & Alejandre
- Hieracium mixtivillosum Brenner
- Hieracium mixtum Lapeyr. ex Froel.
- Hieracium mlinicae (Hruby & Zahn) Chrtek f. & Mráz
- Hieracium modicidens Omang
- Hieracium modiciforme Üksip
- Hieracium moeanum Lindeb.
- Hieracium moense Notø
- Hieracium molestatum Johanss.
- Hieracium molinerianum Arv.-Touv. & Gaut.
- Hieracium mollicaule Norrl.
- Hieracium mollicrinum Omang
- Hieracium mollifolium Omang
- Hieracium molliglandulosum Brenner
- Hieracium mollisetulosum Brenner
- Hieracium mollitum Arv.-Touv.
- Hieracium mollivestitum Notø
- Hieracium molluscum Norrl.
- Hieracium molucratum Johanss. & Sam.
- Hieracium molybdinoides Dahlst.
- Hieracium molybdinum Stenstr. ex Dahlst.
- Hieracium molybdochroum T.Durand & B.D.Jacks.
- Hieracium monacriodes Omang
- Hieracium monanthum Omang
- Hieracium monczecola Üksip
- Hieracium monnieri Arv.-Touv.
- Hieracium monochroum Johanss.
- Hieracium monoticum Brenner
- Hieracium monregalense Burnat & Gremli
- Hieracium monstrosum Hyl.
- Hieracium montcaunicum Pau ex Mateo
- Hieracium montellii Norrl.
- Hieracium montenegrinum Freyn
- Hieracium montipalentinum Mateo, Egido & Gómiz
- Hieracium montis-bovis Mateo
- Hieracium montis-florum Gottschl.
- Hieracium montis-porrarae Gottschl.
- Hieracium montsanticola Pau ex Mateo
- Hieracium montserratii Mateo
- Hieracium montsignaticum Mateo & L.Sáez
- Hieracium moravicum Freyn ex Oborny
- Hieracium morii Hayata
- Hieracium morrubelianum Mateo, Egido & Gómiz
- Hieracium moruloides Adlerz
- Hieracium mosenii Malme
- Hieracium × mrazii Szeląg
- Hieracium mucrodentatum T.Tyler
- Hieracium mucronatum Arv.-Touv. & Gaut.
- Hieracium mucronellum P.D.Sell & C.West
- Hieracium mucroniferum Hyl.
- Hieracium mucronosum Omang
- Hieracium mukaczevense Üksip
- Hieracium multangulum Omang
- Hieracium multiceps (Dahlst.) Dahlst. ex Johanss.
- Hieracium multicolor Dahlst. & A.Magnuss.
- Hieracium multidens (Adlerz) Johanss.
- Hieracium multiferum Norrl.
- Hieracium multifrons Brenner
- Hieracium multisigne Johanss. & Sam.
- Hieracium mundulifolium (Johanss.) T.Tyler
- Hieracium mundulum (Dahlst.) Johanss. & Sam.
- Hieracium mundum P.D.Sell & C.West
- Hieracium munkacsense (Zahn) Schljakov
- Hieracium murcandidum Mateo
- Hieracium muriceps Brenner
- Hieracium murinum Brenner
- Hieracium murlainzii Mateo
- Hieracium murlainzoides Mateo & Egido
- Hieracium murmanense Schljakov
- Hieracium murmanicum (Norrl.) Norrl.
- Hieracium murorum L.
- Hieracium musivale Johanss.
- Hieracium mutabundum Johanss. & Sam.
- Hieracium mutilatiforme Dahlst. ex Notø
- Hieracium mutilatum Almq. ex Elfstr.
- Hieracium myrdalense Ósk.
- Hieracium myrtillinum (Johanss. ex Dahlst.) T.Tyler
- Hieracium myurolepis Omang

== N ==
- Hieracium naegelianum Pančić
- Hieracium naeviferum Dahlst. ex Notø
- Hieracium naevifolium Dahlst. ex Johanss.
- Hieracium naevifrons Omang
- Hieracium naevium (Dahlst. ex Zahn) Dahlst. ex Johanss.
- Hieracium naevosiforme (Dahlst. ex Zahn) Dahlst. ex Johanss.
- Hieracium naevosum Johanss. ex Dahlst.
- Hieracium nanidens Ósk.
- Hieracium nanniscodon Omang
- Hieracium napaeum Zahn
- Hieracium nargonense Mateo
- Hieracium narymense Schischk. & Serg.
- Hieracium nasimovae Stepanov
- Hieracium nastophyllum Johanss.
- Hieracium nastum Johanss.
- Hieracium naviense J.N.Mills
- Hieracium necopinum Buttler
- Hieracium neglectipilosum Sennikov
- Hieracium negoiense (Ravarut & Nyár.) Soó
- Hieracium nematopodum (Zahn) P.D.Sell & C.West
- Hieracium nenukovii Üksip
- Hieracium neobenascanum Mateo, Egido & Gómiz
- Hieracium neobipes Notø
- Hieracium neocerinthe Fr.
- Hieracium neocerinthoides Arv.-Touv. & Briq.
- Hieracium neoclosianum Mateo
- Hieracium neocoracinum Pugsley
- Hieracium neocoriaceum Mateo
- Hieracium neodivergens Gottschl.
- Hieracium neofortunatense Mateo, Egido & Gómiz
- Hieracium neofurcatum Sleumer
- Hieracium neograndescens Notø
- Hieracium neoherrerae Zahn
- Hieracium neolygodes Johanss.
- Hieracium neomalyi Zahn
- Hieracium neomarginatum P.D.Sell
- Hieracium neomicracladium P.D.Sell
- Hieracium neophlomoides Arv.-Touv.
- Hieracium neopicris Arv.-Touv.
- Hieracium neoqueraltense Mateo, Egido & Gómiz
- Hieracium neorepandum P.D.Sell & C.West
- Hieracium neosaliencianum Mateo, Egido & Gómiz
- Hieracium neoserratifrons T.Tyler
- Hieracium neostenophyllum Gottschl. & Brandst.
- Hieracium nepheloides Johanss. & Sam.
- Hieracium nepium Omang
- Hieracium nericiense (Adlerz) Johanss.
- Hieracium neritodon Johanss. & Sam.
- Hieracium neroikense Üksip
- Hieracium neronense Gottschl.
- Hieracium nesaeum Omang
- Hieracium nesiotes Omang
- Hieracium neyranum Arv.-Touv.
- Hieracium nidarosiense Norrl.
- Hieracium nidense (F.Hanb.) Roffey
- Hieracium niederleinii (Zahn) Sleumer
- Hieracium nigelloides Brenner
- Hieracium nigrantipilum Norrl. & H.Lindb.
- Hieracium nigrescens Willd.
- Hieracium nigrescenticeps Omang
- Hieracium nigricanticeps Stenstr. ex Dahlst.
- Hieracium nigriceps Lindeb.
- Hieracium nigrifactum P.D.Sell
- Hieracium nigrisquameum Hyl.
- Hieracium nigristylum Notø
- Hieracium nigritipes Folin
- Hieracium nigritum R.Uechtr.
- Hieracium nigro-olivaceum Folin
- Hieracium nigrocreperum Johanss. & Sam.
- Hieracium nigrocyaneum Johanss. & Sam.
- Hieracium nigrofuscum Johanss. & Sam.
- Hieracium nigrolegionense Mateo, Egido & Alejandre
- Hieracium nigrostylum Zlatník
- Hieracium nigroviridans Folin
- Hieracium nigroviridiceps Folin
- Hieracium nipholasium T.Georgiev & Zahn
- Hieracium nitens Lindeb.
- Hieracium nitentiforme Omang
- Hieracium nitidiceps Omang
- Hieracium nitidum Backh.f.
- Hieracium nivaense Schljakov
- Hieracium niveicuspis Folin
- Hieracium niveobarbatoides Mateo
- Hieracium niveobarbatum Arv.-Touv. ex Gottschl.
- Hieracium niveolimbatum Üksip
- Hieracium niveoornatum Folin
- Hieracium niviferum Norrl.
- Hieracium nivimontis (Oborný & Zahn) Chrtek f.
- Hieracium nizhnetunguskaense Tupitz.
- Hieracium nobile Gren.
- Hieracium nodiferum Omang
- Hieracium nordenstamii Ósk.
- Hieracium nordlanderi Johanss.
- Hieracium nordlandicum Dahlst.
- Hieracium nordstroemii Johanss.
- Hieracium northroense Pugsley
- Hieracium norvegicum Fr.
- Hieracium notabile P.D.Sell & C.West
- Hieracium notense Schljakov
- Hieracium notophilum Ósk.
- Hieracium notoscioides Omang
- Hieracium nubilum Dahlst.
- Hieracium nubitangens Gottschl.
- Hieracium nudicaule (A.Gray) A.Heller
- Hieracium nudicollum Johanss.
- Hieracium nuoliense Johanss.
- Hieracium nyaradyanum Zahn
- Hieracium nyctopum Omang
- Hieracium nymphaeatiforme Dahlst.
- Hieracium nymphaeatum Dahlst. ex Johanss.

== O ==
- Hieracium obatrescens (Dahlst.) Dahlst.
- Hieracium obconicum Brenner
- Hieracium obellipticum Johanss. & Sam.
- Hieracium oblanceolatum Folin
- Hieracium oblaqueatum Johanss.
- Hieracium obliquifolium (Dahlst.) Dahlst. ex Johanss.
- Hieracium obnubilum Norrl.
- Hieracium obovalifrons Folin
- Hieracium obovatifolium V.Jones ex McCosh, D.Barlow, B.Burrow & T.C.G.Rich
- Hieracium obovatifrons Folin
- Hieracium obovoideum Norrl.
- Hieracium obrigens Johanss. & Sam.
- Hieracium obrovacense Degen & Zahn
- Hieracium obscurans Elfstr.
- Hieracium obscuratum Murr
- Hieracium obscuricapitatum Schuhw.
- Hieracium obscurilingua Brenner
- Hieracium obtextifolium Notø
- Hieracium obtextiforme Dahlst. ex Notø
- Hieracium obtextum Dahlst. ex Johanss.
- Hieracium obtusangulum Dahlst.
- Hieracium obtusifrons Folin
- Hieracium obtusissimum Almq. ex Omang
- Hieracium obtusius Hyl.
- Hieracium obtusoserratum Omang
- Hieracium obtusulescens Omang
- Hieracium obtusulum Stenstr. ex Dahlst.
- Hieracium obversiforme Johanss.
- Hieracium obversum (Johanss.) Johanss.
- Hieracium ocenicum Mateo
- Hieracium ochanskiense (Zahn) Üksip ex Schljakov
- Hieracium ochrochlorum Johanss. & Sam.
- Hieracium ochrolomum Omang
- Hieracium ochthophilum P.D.Sell
- Hieracium ocriophyllum Johanss. & Sam.
- Hieracium oddense Omang
- Hieracium odenense Mateo, Egido & Gómiz
- Hieracium odontodes Omang
- Hieracium odontolipes Omang
- Hieracium odontophyllum Freyn & Sint.
- Hieracium odontopleum Omang
- Hieracium oedocephalum Omang
- Hieracium oeneororatum Norrl.
- Hieracium oenophyllum P.D.Sell
- Hieracium oestmanii T.Tyler
- Hieracium offerdalense Johanss.
- Hieracium offulgens Johanss. & Sam.
- Hieracium ofotense Notø
- Hieracium ohlsenii Hyl.
- Hieracium oinopolepis (Malme ex Dahlst.) Dahlst.
- Hieracium oioense (Dahlst.) Üksip
- Hieracium oistophyllum Pugsley
- Hieracium olafii Ósk.
- Hieracium oleaginicolor (Zahn) Zahn
- Hieracium oleosum Dahlst.
- Hieracium oletatum (Johanss. & Sam.) T.Tyler
- Hieracium oligasterum (Johanss. & Sam.) T.Tyler
- Hieracium oligochnoum Johanss. & Sam.
- Hieracium oligodon Nägeli & Peter
- Hieracium oligogonium Johanss. & Sam.
- Hieracium oligograptum Dahlst. ex Notø
- Hieracium oligolepium (Zahn) Stenstr. ex Johanss. & Sam.
- Hieracium oligophorum Omang
- Hieracium oligophyllum Norrl.
- Hieracium oligopolium Johanss.
- Hieracium oligostictum Ohlsén
- Hieracium oligozum Johanss. & Sam.
- Hieracium olivaceiceps Omang
- Hieracium olivaceum Gren. & Godr.
- Hieracium olliceps Johanss.
- Hieracium olympicum Boiss.
- Hieracium omangii Elfstr.
- Hieracium oncadenium Ósk.
- Hieracium oncodes Omang
- Hieracium onosmoides Fr.
- Hieracium onychodontum Hyl.
- Hieracium onychophoroides Omang
- Hieracium onychophorum Omang
- Hieracium oophyllum Omang
- Hieracium opaciceps Johanss. & Sam.
- Hieracium opacum (Lönnr. ex Dahlst.) Johanss.
- Hieracium opdalense Norrl.
- Hieracium opeatodontum Stenstr. ex Dahlst.
- Hieracium opetiolepium Notø
- Hieracium opetiophyllum Dahlst. ex Omang
- Hieracium ophiocladum Omang
- Hieracium opimifolium Omang
- Hieracium opochloroides Johanss. & Sam.
- Hieracium opochlorum Johanss. & Sam.
- Hieracium oppositidens Omang
- Hieracium optimum P.D.Sell & C.West
- Hieracium orariiceps Brenner
- Hieracium orariifolium Johanss. & Sam.
- Hieracium orariiforme Dahlst. ex Johanss.
- Hieracium orarium Lindeb.
- Hieracium orbicantiforme (Dahlst. ex Zahn) Dahlst. ex Johanss.
- Hieracium orbiculatum Folin
- Hieracium orbolense Stenstr. ex Dahlst.
- Hieracium orcadense W.R.Linton
- Hieracium oreiocephalum Zahn
- Hieracium orimeles W.R.Linton
- Hieracium orithales E.F.Linton
- Hieracium ornatiforme (Dahlst. ex Zahn) Dahlst. ex Johanss. & Sam.
- Hieracium ornatilorum P.D.Sell & C.West
- Hieracium ornatissimum (Dahlst. ex Zahn) Dahlst. ex Johanss.
- Hieracium ornatum (Dahlst.) Dahlst.
- Hieracium oroamplexicaule Mateo & Egido
- Hieracium orodoxum Gottschl.
- Hieracium oroelense Mateo, Egido & Gómiz
- Hieracium oroglaucum O.Behr, E.Behr & Zahn
- Hieracium orophilon Elfstr. ex Omang
- Hieracium oropyrenaicum Mateo
- Hieracium orosense Gottschl.
- Hieracium orphnocephalum (Dahlst. ex Zahn) Dahlst. ex Johanss.
- Hieracium orphnocratum Omang
- Hieracium orphnolepium (Dahlst. ex Zahn) Dahlst. ex Johanss.
- Hieracium orsense Johanss.
- Hieracium orsierae Gottschl.
- Hieracium orteganum Arv.-Touv. & Gaut.
- Hieracium orthobrachion (Woł. & Zahn) Schljakov
- Hieracium orthocaulon (Dahlst.) Omang
- Hieracium orthocolon Johanss.
- Hieracium orthoglossum Arv.-Touv. & Gaut.
- Hieracium ortholepium Omang
- Hieracium orthophyton Omang
- Hieracium orthopodum Dahlst.
- Hieracium orthopoides Notø
- Hieracium orthorhachis Sam.
- Hieracium orthostypum Omang
- Hieracium ortiziae Pruski
- Hieracium orupense
- Hieracium osiliae (Dahlst.) Üksip
- Hieracium osmundaceum Johanss.
- Hieracium osonense Mateo, Egido & Gómiz
- Hieracium osorense Mateo, Egido & Gómiz
- Hieracium osormortianum Mateo, Egido & Gómiz
- Hieracium ossaeum Zahn
- Hieracium ostenfeldii Dahlst.
- Hieracium otophorum Hyl.
- Hieracium ovaliceps (Norrl.) Elfstr.
- Hieracium ovaliforme P.D.Sell
- Hieracium ovaligerum Omang
- Hieracium ovatifolians Omang
- Hieracium ove-dahli Omang
- Hieracium ovikense Notø
- Hieracium oxlaense Omang
- Hieracium oxybeles P.D.Sell
- Hieracium oxycerinthe Arv.-Touv. & Gaut.
- Hieracium oxygonium Omang
- Hieracium oxylepium (Dahlst.) Dahlst.
- Hieracium oxyodon Fr.
- Hieracium oxyodontophorum Ósk.
- Hieracium oxypetalum Omang
- Hieracium oxyphylloides Dahlst. ex Notø
- Hieracium oxypleurum Ósk.

== P ==
- Hieracium pachycalamum Johanss. & Sam.
- Hieracium pachycranum Johanss. & Sam.
- Hieracium pachycybe Dahlst.
- Hieracium pachylum Omang
- Hieracium pachymeroides (Omang) Omang
- Hieracium pachyphylloides (Zahn) Roffey
- Hieracium pachyrhizum Norrl.
- Hieracium pachytrachelum (Johanss.) Johanss.
- Hieracium paczoskianum Sennikov
- Hieracium padcayense Sleumer
- Hieracium paediscum Notø
- Hieracium paeminosum Johanss. & Sam.
- Hieracium paganicum Notø
- Hieracium pahnschii Üksip
- Hieracium palantianum Mateo
- Hieracium palatosilense Mateo, Egido & Alejandre
- Hieracium palenicae Rech.f. & Zahn
- Hieracium palentinum Mateo & Alejandre
- Hieracium paleopyrenaicum Mateo & Gómiz
- Hieracium paleoscense Mateo, Egido & Gómiz
- Hieracium paletaranum Sleumer
- Hieracium palezieuxii Zahn
- Hieracium palifolium Omang
- Hieracium pallescens Waldst. & Kit.
- Hieracium pallidiceps Brenner
- Hieracium pallidivirens Ósk.
- Hieracium pallidum Biv.
- Hieracium palmenii Norrl.
- Hieracium paltinae Jáv. & Zahn
- Hieracium pammelanum Omang
- Hieracium pampercum Omang
- Hieracium pamphilii Arv.-Touv.
- Hieracium pampsiloides Omang
- Hieracium pampsilum Omang
- Hieracium panaeoliceps Notø
- Hieracium panaeoliforme (Pohle & Zahn) Üksip
- Hieracium panaeolum Dahlst.
- Hieracium panduriferum Omang
- Hieracium pangaeum Szeląg & Vladimir.
- Hieracium pangoriense Zahn
- Hieracium paniculatum L.
- Hieracium paniculosum Omang
- Hieracium pannosum Boiss.
- Hieracium pannulosum Omang
- Hieracium pantolum Omang
- Hieracium pantrichotum Omang
- Hieracium papillosum Johanss.
- Hieracium paracladium Notø
- Hieracium paracriodes Omang
- Hieracium paraguayense Arv.-Touv. ex Peter
- Hieracium paralium Dahlst.
- Hieracium parallelisquameum Hyl.
- Hieracium paraloides Omang
- Hieracium paramaurum Johanss.
- Hieracium paramecodes Omang
- Hieracium paramorphum Omang
- Hieracium parapolium Omang
- Hieracium paratocum Omang
- Hieracium parceciliatum Norrl.
- Hieracium parcevestitum Dahlst. ex Notø
- Hieracium parcum Notø
- Hieracium parialtum Notø
- Hieracium parikkalense Norrl.
- Hieracium parmiferum Johanss. & Sam.
- Hieracium parmulatum Omang
- Hieracium parnassi Fr.
- Hieracium parryi Zahn
- Hieracium parvellum Notø
- Hieracium parvifactum Norrl.
- Hieracium parviglandulosum H.Lindb.
- Hieracium parvuliceps Brenner
- Hieracium parvulifrons Folin
- Hieracium parypheodes Omang
- Hieracium pasense Üksip
- Hieracium patagiarium (Johanss. ex Dahlst.) Dahlst.
- Hieracium patagonicum Hook.f.
- Hieracium patale Norrl.
- Hieracium patens Bartl.
- Hieracium patentidens Notø
- Hieracium paucidentatum Folin
- Hieracium pauculidens P.D.Sell & C.West
- Hieracium paui Mateo
- Hieracium pauradenium Ósk.
- Hieracium paurocephalum Omang
- Hieracium paurocyma Omang
- Hieracium paurodes Omang
- Hieracium paurodontum Ósk.
- Hieracium paurophyllum (Dahlst. ex Zahn) Dahlst. ex Johanss.
- Hieracium paxianum Nyár. & Zahn
- Hieracium pazense S.F.Blake
- Hieracium peccense (W.R.Linton) P.D.Sell
- Hieracium pectinatum Dahlst.
- Hieracium pedatifolium Omang
- Hieracium pedemontanum Burnat & Gremli
- Hieracium pedosum Elfstr.
- Hieracium pedunculare Tausch
- Hieracium pegodes Omang
- Hieracium pekkarinenii Norrl.
- Hieracium pelagae Degen & Zahn
- Hieracium pellaeocephalum Omang
- Hieracium pellense Gottschl. & Dunkel
- Hieracium pellitum Fr.
- Hieracium penduliforme (Dahlst.) Johanss.
- Hieracium pendulifrons Notø
- Hieracium pendulinum Arv.-Touv. & Gaut.
- Hieracium penduloides Folin
- Hieracium pendulum (Dahlst.) Dahlst.
- Hieracium penicillatum Brenner
- Hieracium pensum P.D.Sell & C.West
- Hieracium pentaploideum P.D.Sell & D.J.Tennant
- Hieracium penzesii F.Kováts & Zahn ex Pénzes
- Hieracium peponomorphum Omang
- Hieracium peracutifrons Omang
- Hieracium peracutum Dahlst. ex Johanss.
- Hieracium perargutum Omang
- Hieracium percissum Jord. ex Boreau
- Hieracium percnophylloides Dahlst. ex Notø
- Hieracium percome Omang
- Hieracium percomiforme Ósk.
- Hieracium percrenatiforme Johanss.
- Hieracium percrenatum Omang
- Hieracium perdentatum Gottschl. & Dunkel
- Hieracium pereffusum Elfstr.
- Hieracium perelegans (Dahlst. & Östman ex Zahn) Dahlst. & Östman ex Johanss.
- Hieracium perexcelsum Omang
- Hieracium perexpansum Hyl.
- Hieracium perichnoum Omang
- Hieracium perintegrum Dahlst.
- Hieracium perissodon Omang
- Hieracium peristericum Zahn
- Hieracium peritranum Omang
- Hieracium perlaniferum Ósk.
- Hieracium perlatescens Dahlst. ex Johanss.
- Hieracium perlatifrons Dahlst. ex Notø
- Hieracium perlaxum Johanss.
- Hieracium perlongum (Dahlst. ex Zahn) Johanss. & Sam.
- Hieracium permaculatum Gottschl.
- Hieracium permundifrons Omang
- Hieracium pernervosum Ósk.
- Hieracium peroblongum P.D.Sell
- Hieracium perornaticeps Omang
- Hieracium perpiliferum Omang
- Hieracium perscitum P.D.Sell & C.West
- Hieracium persimile (Dahlst.) Dahlst.
- Hieracium persimiliforme Omang
- Hieracium persolum Notø
- Hieracium personatiforme Dahlst.
- Hieracium personatum Fr.
- Hieracium pertactum Nota
- Hieracium pertectum Omang
- Hieracium pertenuatum (Dahlst. ex Zahn) Dahlst. ex Johanss.
- Hieracium pertinacifolium Johanss.
- Hieracium pertransiens Notø
- Hieracium peruanum Fr.
- Hieracium perveniens Norrl. & H.Lindb.
- Hieracium pervirens Notø
- Hieracium pessonianum Mateo, Egido & Gómiz
- Hieracium peterfii Nyár. & Zahn
- Hieracium petersii Dahlst.
- Hieracium petioliferum Brenner
- Hieracium petiolinum Sennikov
- Hieracium petiolosum Dahlst.
- Hieracium petraeum Hoppe ex Bluff & Fingerh.
- Hieracium petri-sedanoi Mateo & Gómiz
- Hieracium petri-soriae Mateo, Egido & Gómiz
- Hieracium petrocharis (E.F.Linton) W.R.Linton
- Hieracium petrofundii Üksip
- Hieracium petropavlovskeanum Üksip
- Hieracium petrophyes Omang
- Hieracium petrosae (Zahn) J.-M.Tison
- Hieracium petrovae Vladimir. & Szeląg
- Hieracium pexum (Johanss. ex Dahlst.) Johanss.
- Hieracium pezophyllum Omang
- Hieracium phaedrocheilon Zahn
- Hieracium phaedrochloum Omang
- Hieracium phaedrophyllum Johanss.
- Hieracium phaeochristum Zahn
- Hieracium phaeocomoides (Zahn) Johanss. & Sam.
- Hieracium phaeocybe Norrl.
- Hieracium phaeodermum Johanss. & Sam.
- Hieracium phaeoides Notø
- Hieracium phaeolepioides Dahlst. ex Notø
- Hieracium phaeopogon (Dahlst. ex Notø) Omang
- Hieracium phaeopsarum Dahlst.
- Hieracium phaeopsis Dahlst. ex Johanss. & Sam.
- Hieracium phaeostictum Norrl.
- Hieracium phaeotrichum (Dahlst. ex Zahn) Johanss. & Sam.
- Hieracium phalarograpticeps Notø
- Hieracium phalarograptum (Zahn) Dahlst.
- Hieracium phaleratum Johanss. & Sam.
- Hieracium phaliotrichum Johanss.
- Hieracium phaliotum Omang
- Hieracium phereclades Omang
- Hieracium philanthracinum Johanss. & Sam.
- Hieracium philanthracoides Dahlst. ex Notø
- Hieracium phlomoides Froel.
- Hieracium phocadentum Notø
- Hieracium phocaicum Zahn
- Hieracium pholidotum Stenstr. ex T. Durand & B. D. Jacks.
- Hieracium phrixadenium Omang
- Hieracium phrixoclonum (Omang) Omang
- Hieracium phrixocomoides (Dahlst. ex Zahn) Johanss. & Sam.
- Hieracium phrixocomum Dahlst.
- Hieracium phrixolophum Omang
- Hieracium phrixomalliforme (Omang) Omang
- Hieracium phrixomalloides Dahlst. ex Notø
- Hieracium phrixophyton Omang
- Hieracium phrygionium Johanss.
- Hieracium phylapicinum Notø
- Hieracium phyllochnoum Omang
- Hieracium phyllophyton Omang
- Hieracium phyllostypodes Omang
- Hieracium picenorum Gottschl.
- Hieracium pichinchae Zahn
- Hieracium pichleri A.Kern.
- Hieracium picinellum Notø
- Hieracium piciniforme Dahlst.
- Hieracium picinum Dahlst.
- Hieracium picoalbense Mateo, Egido & Gómiz
- Hieracium picoeuropeanum Mateo & Alejandre
- Hieracium picroides Vill.
- Hieracium pictorum E.F.Linton
- Hieracium pictum Pers.
- Hieracium piedrasechense Mateo, Egido & Gómiz
- Hieracium pierae Mateo & Egido
- Hieracium pietrae Zahn
- Hieracium pietroszense Degen & Zahn
- Hieracium pii-fontii Mateo, L.Sáez, Egido & Gómiz
- Hieracium piliceps Wiinst.
- Hieracium piliferum Hoppe
- Hieracium piligerum (Pugsley) P.D.Sell & C.West
- Hieracium pilosum Froel.
- Hieracium pilulicuspis Folin
- Hieracium pimelophyllum Omang
- Hieracium pinegense Sennikov
- Hieracium pinetophilum (Degen & Zahn) Chrtek f.
- Hieracium pinnigerum Omang
- Hieracium pioracense Gottschl.
- Hieracium piranhae T.E.Nilsson
- Hieracium piranshahricum Tavakkoli & Assadi
- Hieracium pirinicola T.Georgiev & Zahn
- Hieracium pizenze Zahn
- Hieracium placerophylloides Pugsley
- Hieracium placerophyllum (Dahlst. ex Zahn) Johanss.
- Hieracium placerum (Dahlst. ex Zahn) Dahlst. ex Johanss.
- Hieracium placibile Johanss. & Sam.
- Hieracium placolepis Johanss.
- Hieracium placophoroides Omang
- Hieracium placophorum Omang
- Hieracium placotum Omang
- Hieracium planchonianum Timb.-Lagr. & Loret
- Hieracium planifrons Johanss.
- Hieracium planilingua Norrl.
- Hieracium plantagineum Arv.-Touv.
- Hieracium plantaginifrons Schljakov
- Hieracium platamodes Omang
- Hieracium platyanthelum Hyl.
- Hieracium platybasis Johanss.
- Hieracium platygastor Johanss. & Sam.
- Hieracium platylepioides Dahlst.
- Hieracium platylobum Omang
- Hieracium platylonchum Johanss.
- Hieracium platysemum Johanss. & Sam.
- Hieracium pleiocaulodes Brenner
- Hieracium pleistophyllum Omang
- Hieracium pleuroleucum (Dahlst.) Üksip
- Hieracium plicatifrons Folin
- Hieracium plicatum Lindeb.
- Hieracium pljesevicae (Degen & Zahn) Niketić
- Hieracium plumbeolum Johanss.
- Hieracium plumbeum Fr.
- Hieracium plumieri
- Hieracium plumuligerum Dahlst. ex Johanss.
- Hieracium plumulosum Kern.
- Hieracium pluricaule Schischk. & Serg.
- Hieracium poaczense Schljakov
- Hieracium pocuticum Woł.
- Hieracium poecilocybe Norrl.
- Hieracium poecilodermum (Dahlst. ex Zahn) Dahlst. ex Johanss.
- Hieracium poecilops Omang
- Hieracium poecilostictum Dahlst.
- Hieracium pohlei Zahn
- Hieracium pojoritense Woł.
- Hieracium polatschekii Gottschl.
- Hieracium poliobrachinodes Omang
- Hieracium poliobrachium Ósk.
- Hieracium poliocarenum Dahlst. ex Johanss. & Sam.
- Hieracium poliocranum Dahlst. ex Johanss.
- Hieracium poliophaeum Omang
- Hieracium poliostelium Dahlst.
- Hieracium poliotalarum Omang
- Hieracium poliothapsinum Johanss.
- Hieracium poliotrachelum (Dahlst. ex Zahn) Dahlst. ex Johanss.
- Hieracium poliotrichoides Norrl.
- Hieracium poliudovense Üksip
- Hieracium pollinarioides Pugsley
- Hieracium pollinarium F.Hanb.
- Hieracium pollinense Zahn
- Hieracium polycampylum (Dahlst. ex Zahn) Johanss. & Sam.
- Hieracium polycephalum Velen.
- Hieracium polycestum Omang
- Hieracium polycharactum Omang
- Hieracium polychrysum Omang
- Hieracium polycritum Johanss.
- Hieracium polycymum Johanss. & Sam.
- Hieracium polyglaucum Dahlst.
- Hieracium polyglochin Johanss.
- Hieracium polygonifolium Gottschl. & Coșkunç.
- Hieracium polygrammum (Dahlst. ex Zahn) Dahlst. ex Johanss.
- Hieracium polyleucum (Dahlst. ex Zahn) Dahlst. ex Johanss.
- Hieracium polymelinum Johanss.
- Hieracium polymorphophyllum Elfstr.
- Hieracium polypelium Johanss. & Sam.
- Hieracium polyphaeum Omang
- Hieracium polyphyllophorum Omang
- Hieracium polyschistomorphum Johanss.
- Hieracium polysteganum Omang
- Hieracium polysteleum Dahlst.
- Hieracium polystilbum Johanss.
- Hieracium polytmetum Omang
- Hieracium pomoricum Üksip
- Hieracium ponojense Brenner
- Hieracium pontiarnense Gottschl.
- Hieracium porphyrii Schischk. & Serg.
- Hieracium porphyritifrons Folin
- Hieracium porphyrostictum Hyl.
- Hieracium porrectum Fr.
- Hieracium porrifolium L.
- Hieracium porrigens Dahlst.
- Hieracium porrigentiforme Dahlst. ex Johanss.
- Hieracium portanum Belli
- Hieracium porthortense Mateo, L.Sáez, Egido & Gómiz
- Hieracium portlandicum T.C.G.Rich
- Hieracium pospichalii Zahn
- Hieracium potamophilon Elfstr.
- Hieracium praeacutidens Omang
- Hieracium praeacutum (Dahlst. ex Zahn) Dahlst. ex Johanss.
- Hieracium praebiharicum Boros
- Hieracium praecellans Omang
- Hieracium praecinereum Dahlst.
- Hieracium praecipuum Dahlst. ex Norrl.
- Hieracium praecordans Omang
- Hieracium praecurrens Vuk.
- Hieracium praecurvulum Omang
- Hieracium praecuspidatum Omang
- Hieracium praefloccellum
- Hieracium praeglaucans Omang
- Hieracium praegrandiceps Ósk.
- Hieracium praelineare Omang
- Hieracium praelineatum
- Hieracium praelongipes Zahn
- Hieracium praelongum Lindeb.
- Hieracium praelucidum Omang
- Hieracium praematurum Elfstr.
- Hieracium praenodatum Johanss.
- Hieracium praenubilum Norrl.
- Hieracium praepallens (Dahlst.) Dahlst.
- Hieracium praepilulatum Johanss.
- Hieracium praeradians Johanss.
- Hieracium praeravum Notø
- Hieracium praesigne (Zahn) Roffey
- Hieracium praestabile Norrl.
- Hieracium praetenellum Elfstr.
- Hieracium praetenericeps Notø
- Hieracium praetenerifrons Schljakov
- Hieracium praetenerum (Almq. ex Dahlst.) Dahlst.
- Hieracium praetenuans Omang
- Hieracium praetervisum Üksip
- Hieracium praethulense Pugsley
- Hieracium praetusum Johanss. & Sam.
- Hieracium praevalidum Notø
- Hieracium praevarianum Johanss.
- Hieracium praevillosipes Omang
- Hieracium praeviride Johanss. & Sam.
- Hieracium prasinamaurum Ósk.
- Hieracium prasinescens (Dahlst. ex Zahn) Dahlst. ex Johanss.
- Hieracium prasinochroum (Dahlst. ex Zahn) Dahlst. ex Johanss.
- Hieracium prasioellipticum Norrl.
- Hieracium prasiolaetum Norrl.
- Hieracium prasioleptum Norrl.
- Hieracium pratensicola Notø
- Hieracium pratorum-tivi Gottschl.
- Hieracium pravidens Johanss. & Sam.
- Hieracium praviforme T.Tyler
- Hieracium pravifrons
- Hieracium prediliense (Nägeli & Peter) Zahn
- Hieracium prenanthoides Vill.
- Hieracium pretiosum Wiinst.
- Hieracium prietoi Mateo, L.Sáez, Egido & Gómiz
- Hieracium prilakenense (Zahn) Schljakov
- Hieracium pringlei A.Gray
- Hieracium pristerodes Omang
- Hieracium pristophyllum Johanss.
- Hieracium probolophorum Omang
- Hieracium probum P.D.Sell & C.West
- Hieracium procedens Omang
- Hieracium procerellum Omang
- Hieracium procerulum Brenner
- Hieracium prodanianum Nyár. & Zahn
- Hieracium productum (Dahlst. ex Zahn) Dahlst. ex Johanss.
- Hieracium profetanum Belli
- Hieracium profugum Norrl.
- Hieracium progrediens Norrl.
- Hieracium prolatatum Johanss.
- Hieracium prolatescens Johanss. & Sam.
- Hieracium prolinguatum Johanss. & Sam.
- Hieracium prolixatum Brenner
- Hieracium prolixiceps (Dahlst. & Enander ex Zahn) Dahlst. & Enander
- Hieracium promontoriale P.D.Sell
- Hieracium pronum Notø
- Hieracium prostratum Poir.
- Hieracium protenozum Omang
- Hieracium protentum P.D.Sell
- Hieracium protoconquense Mateo, Egido & Gómiz
- Hieracium protractidens (Dahlst. & Östman ex Zahn) Johanss. & Sam.
- Hieracium protractifolium (Dahlst. ex Zahn) Dahlst. ex Johanss.
- Hieracium protractiforme Omang
- Hieracium protractifrons Hyl.
- Hieracium protractum (Fr.) Lindeb.
- Hieracium proversiforme Johanss.
- Hieracium proversum Johanss.
- Hieracium proximum F.Hanb.
- Hieracium pruinale (Zahn) P.D.Sell & C.West
- Hieracium pruiniferum (Norrl.) Norrl.
- Hieracium psammogenes Omang
- Hieracium psaridianum Zahn
- Hieracium psefochaetum Brenner
- Hieracium psepharoidiceps Notø
- Hieracium psepharomorphoides Notø
- Hieracium psepharum (Dahlst.) Sam.
- Hieracium pseudacroleucum McCosh
- Hieracium pseudadsimilans Notø
- Hieracium pseudalpinum (Nägeli & Peter) Prain
- Hieracium pseudamaurophyllum (Zahn) Johanss.
- Hieracium pseudandurense (de Retz) Mateo & Egido
- Hieracium pseudanfractum Dahlst.
- Hieracium pseudanglicoides Raven, P.D.Sell & C.West
- Hieracium pseudanglicum Pugsley
- Hieracium pseudangustellum Norrl.
- Hieracium pseudarctophilum Schljakov
- Hieracium pseudarnelli Notø
- Hieracium pseudartatum Notø
- Hieracium pseudatopum Omang
- Hieracium pseudaustrale Gottschl.
- Hieracium pseuderectum Schljakov
- Hieracium pseudexpansum Notø
- Hieracium pseudextracticeps Notø
- Hieracium pseudindutum Notø
- Hieracium pseudintegratum McCosh
- Hieracium pseudinuloides Zahn ex Gottschl. & Brandst.
- Hieracium pseudo-omangii Schljakov
- Hieracium pseudoalejandrei Mateo & Egido
- Hieracium pseudoatratum Woł.
- Hieracium pseudobasifolium Omang
- Hieracium pseudobertramii Brenner
- Hieracium pseudobifidum Błocki
- Hieracium pseudobipes Elfstr.
- Hieracium pseudobocconei Notø
- Hieracium pseudoboreum Schljakov
- Hieracium pseudocaesiiforme Nyár. & Zahn
- Hieracium pseudocaesium Degen & Zahn
- Hieracium pseudocanipes Dahlst. ex Omang
- Hieracium pseudocaudatulum Notø
- Hieracium pseudocerinthe (Gaudin) W.D.J.Koch
- Hieracium pseudocharadrotes Omang
- Hieracium pseudochlorophanes Notø
- Hieracium pseudochristianiense Omang
- Hieracium pseudocolocentrum Notø
- Hieracium pseudoconfluens Notø
- Hieracium pseudocongruens Schljakov
- Hieracium pseudoconstrictum Zahn
- Hieracium pseudocorymbosum Gremli
- Hieracium pseudocrassiceps Notø
- Hieracium pseudocrebridens (Dahlst. ex Zahn) Dahlst. ex Johanss.
- Hieracium pseudocurvatifolium Notø
- Hieracium pseudocurvatum (Zahn) Pugsley
- Hieracium pseudodanicum Note
- Hieracium pseudodenigrans Notø
- Hieracium pseudodenticuliferum H.Lindb.
- Hieracium pseudodiaphanum (Dahlst.) Johanss.
- Hieracium pseudodiminuens Johanss. & Sam.
- Hieracium pseudodolichaetum (Benz & Zahn) Zahn
- Hieracium pseudodollineri (Murr & Zahn) Murr & Zahn
- Hieracium pseudodontodes Omang
- Hieracium pseudodulacianum (de Retz) Mateo
- Hieracium pseudoexpallidum Notø
- Hieracium pseudofariniramum Tupitz.
- Hieracium pseudofestiviforme Notø
- Hieracium pseudofioniae Wiinst.
- Hieracium pseudofritzei (Benz & Zahn) Gutermann
- Hieracium pseudogaeutaense Folin
- Hieracium pseudogelertii Dahlst.
- Hieracium pseudoglabridens Schljakov
- Hieracium pseudogratiosum Wiinst.
- Hieracium pseudogriphodes Omang
- Hieracium pseudogrovesianum Gottschl.
- Hieracium pseudohapalotrichum Notø
- Hieracium pseudohypochnoodes Schljakov
- Hieracium pseudoilerdense Mateo
- Hieracium pseudoincrassans Johanss.
- Hieracium pseudojutlandicum Wiinst.
- Hieracium pseudolachenalii Gottschl. & Dunkel
- Hieracium pseudolaeticeps Johanss.
- Hieracium pseudolaggeri Zahn
- Hieracium pseudolainzii Mateo & Egido
- Hieracium pseudolatypeum Schljakov
- Hieracium pseudoleyi (Zahn) Roffey
- Hieracium pseudolitoreum Norrl. & Palmgr.
- Hieracium pseudoloscosianum Mateo
- Hieracium pseudolyratum Norrl.
- Hieracium pseudomaculosum Dahlst. ex Notø
- Hieracium pseudometaliceps Notø
- Hieracium pseudomicans Notø
- Hieracium pseudomixopolium Notø
- Hieracium pseudomixtum Mateo & Egido
- Hieracium pseudonanodes Omang
- Hieracium pseudonigritum
- Hieracium pseudopachycephalum Notø
- Hieracium pseudopachyodon Hyl.
- Hieracium pseudopallidum Gottschl.
- Hieracium pseudopalmenii Schljakov
- Hieracium pseudopaltinae Nyár. & Zahn
- Hieracium pseudopediaeum Wiinst.
- Hieracium pseudopellucidum Brenner
- Hieracium pseudopetiolatum (Zahn) Roffey
- Hieracium pseudophyllodes (Zahn) Üksip
- Hieracium pseudopicinum Dahlst. ex Notø
- Hieracium pseudoplaceriforme Notø
- Hieracium pseudoplicatum (Dahlst. ex Zahn) Johanss.
- Hieracium pseudopoliocranum Notø
- Hieracium pseudopolycomum Notø
- Hieracium pseudoprasinatum Norrl.
- Hieracium pseudoprasinops Zahn
- Hieracium pseudoprotractum Notø
- Hieracium pseudopsepharum T.Tyler
- Hieracium pseudoratezatense Nyár. & Zahn
- Hieracium pseudoringselense Folin
- Hieracium pseudorionii (Zahn) P.D.Sell & C.West
- Hieracium pseudosarcophyllum Pugsley
- Hieracium pseudoscardicum
- Hieracium pseudoscioides Johanss.
- Hieracium pseudoseidense Notø
- Hieracium pseudosevericeps McCosh
- Hieracium pseudosilvaticum Notø
- Hieracium pseudosparsum R.Uechtr. ex Zahn
- Hieracium pseudospeireum Norrl. & H.Lindb.
- Hieracium pseudostenolepis Folin
- Hieracium pseudostenoplecum Zahn
- Hieracium pseudostenstroemii Pugsley
- Hieracium pseudostupposum Zahn
- Hieracium pseudosubcyaneum V.Jones ex McCosh, D.Barlow, B.Burrow & T.C.G.Rich
- Hieracium pseudosvaneticum Peter
- Hieracium pseudothulense Notø
- Hieracium pseudotransiens (Dahlst. ex Zahn) Dahlst. ex Notø
- Hieracium pseudotranssilvanicum (Zahn) Zahn
- Hieracium pseudotriangulare Notø
- Hieracium pseudovatricosum Notø
- Hieracium pseudovranjanum O.Behr, E.Behr & Zahn
- Hieracium pseudozetlandicum Roffey
- Hieracium psilacrum Brenner
- Hieracium psilocentroides Notø
- Hieracium psilodorum Johanss.
- Hieracium psilolainzii Mateo & Egido
- Hieracium psiloloma Hyl.
- Hieracium psilozaleoides Omang
- Hieracium psilozaleum Omang
- Hieracium psilurum Hyl.
- Hieracium psittacinum Hyl.
- Hieracium psychroadenium Sleumer
- Hieracium pteropodium Johanss. & Sam.
- Hieracium pteropogon Arv.-Touv.
- Hieracium pterygotum Omang
- Hieracium ptilophorum Hyl.
- Hieracium pubenticeps Dahlst. ex Notø
- Hieracium pubiceps Brenner
- Hieracium pubicuspis Johanss.
- Hieracium pugsleyi P.D.Sell & C.West
- Hieracium pujattii Gottschl.
- Hieracium pulchelliforme Dahlst. ex Omang
- Hieracium pulchellum Gren.
- Hieracium pulchriceps Hyl.
- Hieracium pulchridens Dahlst. ex Johanss.
- Hieracium pulchrius (Ley) W.R.Linton
- Hieracium pullicalicitum Omang
- Hieracium pulliceps Norrl.
- Hieracium pulveraceum (Dahlst. & Enander ex Zahn) Dahlst. & Enander ex Johanss.
- Hieracium pulvericeps Folin
- Hieracium pulvimarginatum Folin
- Hieracium pumicatifolium Johanss.
- Hieracium pumilare (Omang) Omang
- Hieracium pumilio Norrl.
- Hieracium punctilloides Notø
- Hieracium punctillum Notø
- Hieracium puricolor Johanss.
- Hieracium purpurascens Scheele ex Willk.
- Hieracium purpurifolium Elfstr.
- Hieracium purpurifrons Notø
- Hieracium purpuriguttatum Ósk.
- Hieracium purpuristictum Üksip
- Hieracium puschlachtae (Pohle & Zahn) Üksip
- Hieracium pusilliceps (Dahlst. ex Zahn) Dahlst. ex Johanss.
- Hieracium pusillifolium P.D.Sell
- Hieracium putoranicum Tupitz.
- Hieracium pycnotomum Johanss. & Sam.
- Hieracium pycnotrichum (W.R.Linton) Roffey
- Hieracium pyramidale Omang
- Hieracium pyrenaeojurassicum Mateo
- Hieracium pyrenaeolanatum Mateo, Egido & Gómiz
- Hieracium pyrenaeoscense Mateo
- Hieracium pyrgosense Rech.f. & Zahn
- Hieracium pyrolifolium Ósk.
- Hieracium pyrrhocranum Dahlst.
- Hieracium pyrrhopum Omang
- Hieracium pyrsjuense Üksip

== Q ==
- Hieracium quadridentatum Hyl.
- Hieracium quasilliferum Johanss. & Sam.
- Hieracium queraltense de Retz
- Hieracium quercifolium T.E.Nilsson
- Hieracium quinquemonticola Üksip

== R ==
- Hieracium racemosiforme (Zahn) Zahn
- Hieracium racemosum Waldst. & Kit. ex Willd.
- Hieracium racolympicum Gottschl. & Dunkel
- Hieracium raddeanum Zahn
- Hieracium radiiflorum Hyl.
- Hieracium radinum (Omang) Omang
- Hieracium radiodens Folin
- Hieracium radiopes Folin
- Hieracium radyrense (Pugsley) P.D.Sell & C.West
- Hieracium raftevollense Omang
- Hieracium ragnarii T.Tyler
- Hieracium ragognae Gottschl.
- Hieracium ramolainzii Mateo, Egido & Alejandre
- Hieracium ramondii Griseb.
- Hieracium ramosissimum Hegetschw.
- Hieracium ramosum Waldst. & Kit. ex Willd.
- Hieracium ramselense Johanss.
- Hieracium ramsoense Notø
- Hieracium ramulatum Omang
- Hieracium randense Omang
- Hieracium rapunculoides Arv.-Touv.
- Hieracium rapunculoidiforme Woł.
- Hieracium rasile Norrl.
- Hieracium ratluense Zahn
- Hieracium rauzense Murr
- Hieracium ravaudii Arv.-Touv.
- Hieracium raveniorum P.D.Sell
- Hieracium ravidum Brenner
- Hieracium ravusculum (Dahlst.) Dahlst.
- Hieracium reayense (Pugsley) P.D.Sell
- Hieracium rebildense Wiinst.
- Hieracium rechingeriorum Zahn
- Hieracium reclinatiforme (Dahlst.) Johanss.
- Hieracium recoderi de Retz
- Hieracium rectiforme Johanss. & Sam.
- Hieracium rectulum Ley
- Hieracium recurvidens Omang
- Hieracium regillatiforme Johanss. & Sam.
- Hieracium regillatum Johanss. & Sam.
- Hieracium reisense Omang
- Hieracium reitzianum Cabrera ex Urtubey
- Hieracium relaxatum Omang
- Hieracium remanens (Malme) Dahlst.
- Hieracium remanentiforme Dahlst. ex Johanss.
- Hieracium remissiceps Omang
- Hieracium remissifolium Notø
- Hieracium remotidens Johanss. & Sam.
- Hieracium remotilingua Brenner
- Hieracium repandifrons Brenner
- Hieracium repandilaterum Ósk.
- Hieracium repandulare Druce
- Hieracium respondens Johanss.
- Hieracium resupinatum Almq. ex Dahlst.
- Hieracium retectum Johanss.
- Hieracium reticulatiforme P.D.Sell
- Hieracium reticulatum Lindeb.
- Hieracium retifolium (Dahlst.) Dahlst.
- Hieracium retrorsum Folin
- Hieracium retusulum Ohlsén
- Hieracium retyezatense Degen & Zahn
- Hieracium reversidens Folin
- Hieracium revocantiforme Schljakov
- Hieracium rhabdoides Omang
- Hieracium rhacanthes Omang
- Hieracium rhacolobum Omang
- Hieracium rhacophyllum Omang
- Hieracium rhacoscelum Omang
- Hieracium rhamphodon Omang
- Hieracium rhodacrum Brenner
- Hieracium rhodanopum Omang
- Hieracium rhogaleum Omang
- Hieracium rhombicum McCosh
- Hieracium rhombiferum Norrl.
- Hieracium rhomboides (Stenstr.) Johanss.
- Hieracium rhombotum Ósk.
- Hieracium rhopicodes Omang
- Hieracium rhopophorum Omang
- Hieracium rhynchellum Omang
- Hieracium rhypaeum Omang
- Hieracium richenii Murr
- Hieracium richerianum Arv.-Touv. & Gaut.
- Hieracium richianum Szeląg
- Hieracium riddelsdellii Pugsley
- Hieracium rierae Mateo
- Hieracium rigentipilosum Johanss.
- Hieracium rigescens Johanss. & Sam.
- Hieracium rigescoides T.E.Nilsson
- Hieracium riglosianum Mateo
- Hieracium ringselense Folin
- Hieracium ringsellei Dahlst.
- Hieracium riofrioi Pau & Font Quer
- Hieracium riolagoanum Mateo, Egido & Gómiz
- Hieracium rioxanum Mateo
- Hieracium riparium Üksip
- Hieracium riphaeoides Bornm. & Zahn
- Hieracium riphaeum R.Uechtr.
- Hieracium rivale F.Hanb.
- Hieracium rivas-martinezii Mateo
- Hieracium rivoense Folin
- Hieracium rizense Gottschl. & Coșkunç.
- Hieracium robertsii P.D.Sell
- Hieracium robinsonii (Zahn) Fernald
- Hieracium roboratum Johanss. & Sam.
- Hieracium robustum Fr.
- Hieracium rohacsense Kit.
- Hieracium rohlenae Zlatník
- Hieracium ronasii P.D.Sell
- Hieracium ronayense McCosh
- Hieracium rosselloanum Mateo
- Hieracium rossicum Schljakov
- Hieracium rostanii Nägeli & Peter
- Hieracium rosulare Brenner
- Hieracium rosulatum Lindeb.
- Hieracium rottii Gottschl.
- Hieracium rubefactum Johanss.
- Hieracium ruberulum (Dahlst. ex Stenstr.) Dahlst.
- Hieracium rubicundiforme (Zahn) Roffey
- Hieracium rubiginans Norrl.
- Hieracium rubiginosum F.Hanb.
- Hieracium rubrimaculatum Ósk.
- Hieracium ruminosiforme Johanss. & Sam.
- Hieracium ruminosum Johanss. & Sam.
- Hieracium runcinatolobatum (Zahn) J.-M.Tison
- Hieracium rupestre All.
- Hieracium rupicola Jord.
- Hieracium rupicoliforme Zahn
- Hieracium rupicoloides Woł.
- Hieracium rupivivum
- Hieracium rutilans Norrl.
- Hieracium rutiliceps Omang

== S ==
- Hieracium sabaudolympicum Gottschl. & Dunkel
- Hieracium sabaudum L.
- Hieracium saccotum Omang
- Hieracium saezii Mateo & Gómiz
- Hieracium safonoviae Sennikov
- Hieracium sagittipotens Norrl.
- Hieracium sahunianum Mateo, Egido & Gómiz
- Hieracium sajambrense Mateo, Egido & Alejandre
- Hieracium salense Mateo, Egido & Gómiz
- Hieracium salicarium Arv.-Touv.
- Hieracium saliencianum de Retz ex Aedo, Argüelles, J.M.González & M.Laínz
- Hieracium salviifolium Arv.-Touv. & Gaut.
- Hieracium samuelssonianum Omang
- Hieracium sandozianum Zahn
- Hieracium sangilense Tupitz.
- Hieracium sanguineum (Ley) W.R.Linton
- Hieracium sanisidroanum Mateo, Egido & Gómiz
- Hieracium sannoxense P.D.Sell
- Hieracium santaniolense Mateo, Egido & Gómiz
- Hieracium santhilaricum Mateo, Egido & Gómiz
- Hieracium sarcophylloides Dahlst.
- Hieracium sarcophylloton Ósk.
- Hieracium sarcophyllum Stenstr. ex Dahlst.
- Hieracium sarissatum Johanss.
- Hieracium sartorianum Boiss. & Heldr.
- Hieracium sathranthum Omang
- Hieracium saturicolor Omang
- Hieracium saurotoides Johanss. & Sam.
- Hieracium saurotum Johanss.
- Hieracium sauzei Arv.-Touv.
- Hieracium savokarelicum Norrl.
- Hieracium savonicum Norrl.
- Hieracium saxatile Jacq.
- Hieracium saxifragum Fr.
- Hieracium saxorum (F.Hanb.) P.D.Sell & C.West
- Hieracium scabratum Brenner
- Hieracium scabrescens (Johanss. ex Dahlst.) Johanss.
- Hieracium scabrisetum (Zahn) Roffey
- Hieracium scabrum Michx.
- Hieracium scalenum (Norrl.) Norrl. ex Omang
- Hieracium scamandris Zahn
- Hieracium scapiforme Brenner
- Hieracium scapigerum Boiss., Orph. & Heldr.
- Hieracium scapophyllum Omang
- Hieracium scardicum Bornm. & Zahn
- Hieracium scarpicum Pugsley
- Hieracium schefferi Rech.f. & Zahn
- Hieracium schellianum Üksip
- Hieracium schennikovii Schljakov
- Hieracium scheppigianum Freyn
- Hieracium schipczinskii Üksip
- Hieracium schischkinii Üksip
- Hieracium schisticolor (Dahlst. ex Zahn) Dahlst. ex Johanss.
- Hieracium schistostegum Omang
- Hieracium schlegelii Almq. ex Johanss.
- Hieracium schliakovii Üksip
- Hieracium schlyteri (Lindeb. ex Dahlst.) Johanss.
- Hieracium schmidtii Tausch
- Hieracium schneiderianum Zlatník
- Hieracium schreiteri Sleumer
- Hieracium schultzii Fr.
- Hieracium schustleri Zlatník
- Hieracium sciagraptum Omang
- Hieracium scioides (Johanss.) Johanss.
- Hieracium scitulum Woł.
- Hieracium scitum (Notø) Notø
- Hieracium scoliodon Omang
- Hieracium scolopodon Omang
- Hieracium scolopoglossum Ósk.
- Hieracium scopolii Gottschl. & S.Orsenigo
- Hieracium scopolioides Gottschl. & S.Orsenigo
- Hieracium scopulinum Norrl.
- Hieracium scorzonerifolium Vill.
- Hieracium scotaiolepis Elfstr.
- Hieracium scoticum F.Hanb.
- Hieracium scotinum Brenner
- Hieracium scotocephalum (Dahlst. ex Zahn) Dahlst. ex Johanss.
- Hieracium scotocranum (Johanss.) Johanss.
- Hieracium scotolophum Omang
- Hieracium scottii P.D.Sell
- Hieracium scouleri Hook.
- Hieracium scullyi E.F.Linton
- Hieracium scytalocephalum Omang
- Hieracium scythropum Omang
- Hieracium scytophyllum Omang
- Hieracium seductum (Notø ex O.Behr) Notø
- Hieracium segevoldense (Syr. & Zahn) Üksip
- Hieracium segregatum Wiinst.
- Hieracium segureum Arv.-Touv.
- Hieracium segusianum Gottschl.
- Hieracium seidense Elfstr.
- Hieracium selanderi Dahlst. ex Notø
- Hieracium sellandii Omang
- Hieracium sellii Idrees & Z.Yong Zhang
- Hieracium semialpinum Ósk.
- Hieracium semianglicum Ósk.
- Hieracium semiangustum Omang
- Hieracium semiapertum Johanss.
- Hieracium semibipes (Dahlst.) Dahlst.
- Hieracium semicaesium Wiinst.
- Hieracium semicanescens Gottschl.
- Hieracium semicanipes Dahlst.
- Hieracium semicanum Johanss.
- Hieracium semichlorellum Norrl.
- Hieracium semicreperum Wiinst.
- Hieracium semicrispum Omang
- Hieracium semicurvatum Norrl.
- Hieracium semidovrense Elfstr.
- Hieracium semileptoglossum Notø
- Hieracium semilimbatum Sennikov
- Hieracium semilyratum Norrl.
- Hieracium seminigrans Brenner
- Hieracium semiobtusissimum Notø
- Hieracium semiornatum Dahlst. ex Ohlsén
- Hieracium semipallescens Gottschl.
- Hieracium semipendulum Folin
- Hieracium semipercome Ósk.
- Hieracium semiprasinatum Norrl.
- Hieracium semiprolixum Dahlst.
- Hieracium semiseptentrionale Norrl. & H.Lindb.
- Hieracium semistellatifrons Folin
- Hieracium semisuperbum Ósk.
- Hieracium senectum Dahlst.
- Hieracium senescens Backh.f.
- Hieracium senex (Dahlst.) Dahlst.
- Hieracium separ Johanss.
- Hieracium separatidens Omang
- Hieracium serdanyolae (Zahn) Mateo
- Hieracium sericellum (Dahlst.) Dahlst.
- Hieracium sericolepis Brenner
- Hieracium sericophyllum Nejceff & Zahn
- Hieracium seriflorum Hyl.
- Hieracium seripodum Notø
- Hieracium sermenikense Freyn & Sint.
- Hieracium serracadiense Mateo
- Hieracium serratodentatum Fagerstr.
- Hieracium serratoellipticum Folin
- Hieracium serratum Nägeli & Peter
- Hieracium serrulosum Omang
- Hieracium sershukense Üksip
- Hieracium setanium Omang
- Hieracium setarum Elfstr.
- Hieracium seticollum Norrl.
- Hieracium setosissimum Dahlst. ex Omang
- Hieracium severiceps Wiinst.
- Hieracium sexangulare Schljakov
- Hieracium shaparenkoi Schljakov
- Hieracium sherwalii Abedin & Zamarrud
- Hieracium shoolbredii E.S.Marshall
- Hieracium sigalodes Omang
- Hieracium signatum (Dahlst. ex Zahn) Dahlst. ex Johanss.
- Hieracium silenii (Norrl.) Norrl.
- Hieracium siliginellum (Dahlst.) Johanss. & Sam.
- Hieracium siliginosum Stenstr. ex Dahlst.
- Hieracium siljense (Johanss.) Johanss.
- Hieracium sillrense Johanss.
- Hieracium silsinum Nägeli & Peter
- Hieracium siltense Johanss.
- Hieracium siluriense (F.Hanb.) P.D.Sell
- Hieracium silvaticoides Pugsley
- Hieracium silvicomum Üksip
- Hieracium simbruinicum Gottschl.
- Hieracium simia Huter ex Zahn
- Hieracium similifolium Brenner
- Hieracium similigerum Johanss.
- Hieracium sinoaestivum Sennikov
- Hieracium sinuans F.Hanb.
- Hieracium sinuatum Lindeberg ex Omang
- Hieracium sinulosum Omang
- Hieracium sinuolatum P.D.Sell
- Hieracium sinusculatum Omang
- Hieracium siphlanthum Omang
- Hieracium siphloglossum Omang
- Hieracium sivorkae Üksip
- Hieracium skarddalicum Ósk.
- Hieracium skutchii S.F.Blake
- Hieracium skutudalicum Ósk.
- Hieracium skytteanum Folin
- Hieracium sliravarrense Omang
- Hieracium slovacum Chrtek f.
- Hieracium smaragdinum Brenner
- Hieracium smolandicum (Almq. ex Dahlst.) Dahlst.
- Hieracium snowdoniense P.D.Sell & C.West
- Hieracium sociale (Pau) Mateo & Egido
- Hieracium sococratoideum Omang
- Hieracium socophyes Omang
- Hieracium soczavae Üksip
- Hieracium sodiroanum Zahn
- Hieracium soerdalense Notø
- Hieracium solanum Johanss.
- Hieracium soleifolium Johanss.
- Hieracium solerianum Mateo
- Hieracium solhemense Norrl.
- Hieracium solidagineum Fr.
- Hieracium solmiense Notø
- Hieracium solocinum (Johanss.) Johanss. & Sam.
- Hieracium solonieviczii Schljakov
- Hieracium solum P.D.Sell & C.West
- Hieracium solutum Notø
- Hieracium sommerfeltii Lindeb.
- Hieracium sonchoides Arv.-Touv.
- Hieracium sophiae Norrl.
- Hieracium sorianum Mateo
- Hieracium sosvaense Schljakov
- Hieracium sowadeense P.D.Sell
- Hieracium soyerifolium Arv.-Touv.
- Hieracium spadiceum Norrl.
- Hieracium spaniotrichum Hyl.
- Hieracium spanocomum (Dahlst. & Enander ex Zahn) Dahlst. & Enander ex Johanss.
- Hieracium spargens Sam.
- Hieracium sparsidens Dahlst.
- Hieracium sparsidentiforme Elfstr. ex Johanss.
- Hieracium sparsifolium Lindeb.
- Hieracium sparsifrons P.D.Sell & C.West
- Hieracium sparsiguttatum Hyl.
- Hieracium sparsiramum Nägeli & Peter
- Hieracium sparsivestitum Gottschl.
- Hieracium sparsum Friv.
- Hieracium spatalops Omang
- Hieracium spathoglossum Norrl.
- Hieracium spathulatum Scheele
- Hieracium spathulum Notø
- Hieracium speciosum Hornem.
- Hieracium spectabile Arv.-Touv.
- Hieracium spectandum Timb.-Lagr.
- Hieracium speculare Johanss. & Sam.
- Hieracium speireodes Brenner
- Hieracium speirodon G.E.Haglund
- Hieracium spenceanum W.Scott & R.C.Palmer
- Hieracium sphacelolepis Brenner
- Hieracium sphaerocalyx Brenner
- Hieracium sphaerocranum Johanss.
- Hieracium sphaeroideum Brenner
- Hieracium sphagnicola S.F.Blake
- Hieracium sphenoides (Dahlst. ex Zahn) Dahlst. ex Johanss.
- Hieracium sphenophyllum Dahlst.
- Hieracium spiculatum Dahlst. ex Notø
- Hieracium spiculiferum Omang
- Hieracium spidiophyton Omang
- Hieracium spilodes Norrl.
- Hieracium spilophyllum Dahlst.
- Hieracium spilotum Dahlst.
- Hieracium spinophytum Johanss.
- Hieracium spinulatum Omang
- Hieracium spissidens (Dahlst. ex Zahn) Dahlst. ex Johanss.
- Hieracium spissifolium Omang
- Hieracium splendens Elfstr.
- Hieracium spodiocladum Hyl.
- Hieracium spodiolepis Hyl.
- Hieracium spodiopilum Omang
- Hieracium spodiozum Omang
- Hieracium spodocephalum Gottschl. & Coșkunç.
- Hieracium spodolepis Omang
- Hieracium spodoleucum (Dahlst.) Dahlst. ex Johanss.
- Hieracium sporadicum Norrl.
- Hieracium spretum Notø
- Hieracium sprucei Arv.-Touv.
- Hieracium spurcaticeps (Dahlst. ex Zahn) Dahlst. ex Johanss.
- Hieracium spurcifrons Dahlst.
- Hieracium squalidiceps Omang
- Hieracium squarrosofurcatum Gottschl.
- Hieracium stabile Norrl.
- Hieracium stabilipes Norrl.
- Hieracium stachyoideum Arv.-Touv.
- Hieracium staminodes Omang
- Hieracium stannardii D.J.N.Hind
- Hieracium starheimense Omang
- Hieracium staticoides Johanss.
- Hieracium staui Belli
- Hieracium staurodes Omang
- Hieracium staurozum Omang
- Hieracium steenhoffii Johanss. & Sam.
- Hieracium stefanssonii Omang
- Hieracium steffensenii Ósk.
- Hieracium steinbergianum Üksip
- Hieracium steindorii (Omang) Omang
- Hieracium stellatifolium (Omang) Dahlst. ex Ósk.
- Hieracium stellatifrons Folin
- Hieracium stelligerum Froel.
- Hieracium stellulosum Omang
- Hieracium steloides Johanss.
- Hieracium stenaethalum Omang
- Hieracium stenanthelum Zahn
- Hieracium stenbergii T.Tyler
- Hieracium steneces Omang
- Hieracium stenianum T.E.Nilsson
- Hieracium stenochlorolepis Omang
- Hieracium stenocola Johanss. & Sam.
- Hieracium stenocoloides Johanss. & Sam.
- Hieracium stenocranoides Wiinst.
- Hieracium stenodon Elfstr.
- Hieracium stenodontophyllum Nyár. & Zahn
- Hieracium stenogrammum (Dahlst. ex Zahn) Dahlst. ex Johanss.
- Hieracium stenolepidoides Folin
- Hieracium stenolepiforme (Pugsley) P.D.Sell & C.West
- Hieracium stenolomoides Johanss. & Sam.
- Hieracium stenolomum (Dahlst. ex Zahn) Dahlst.
- Hieracium stenolonchoides Omang
- Hieracium stenolonchum (Dahlst. ex Zahn) Dahlst. ex Johanss.
- Hieracium stenolope Omang
- Hieracium stenolophum Omang
- Hieracium stenomischum Omang
- Hieracium stenopholidium (Dahlst.) Omang
- Hieracium stenophyes W.R.Linton
- Hieracium stenopifolium Omang
- Hieracium stenopiforme (Pohle & Zahn) Elfstr.
- Hieracium stenopithodes Omang
- Hieracium stenoplecum Arv.-Touv. & Huter
- Hieracium stenopolium Omang
- Hieracium stenopum Omang
- Hieracium stenoschemon Omang
- Hieracium stenosemum Johanss. & Sam.
- Hieracium stenotaeniceps Notø
- Hieracium stenothyrsum Omang
- Hieracium stenotrichum (Dahlst. ex Zahn) Dahlst. ex Johanss.
- Hieracium stenotropoides Omang
- Hieracium stenozostum Omang
- Hieracium stenstroemii Dahlst.
- Hieracium stereophyton Omang
- Hieracium sternbergianum Chrtek f.
- Hieracium sterzingense Zahn
- Hieracium stewartii (F.Hanb.) Roffey
- Hieracium stibeophyllum Dahlst.
- Hieracium stibergense Notø
- Hieracium stictocentrum Dahlst. ex Notø
- Hieracium stictophylloides Ósk.
- Hieracium stictum P.D.Sell
- Hieracium stilbocephalum Johanss.
- Hieracium stiptadenioides Johanss. & Sam.
- Hieracium stiptadenium (Dahlst. ex Zahn) Dahlst.
- Hieracium stirovacense Degen & Zahn
- Hieracium stoedvarense Omang
- Hieracium storliense Norrl.
- Hieracium straforelloanum Zahn
- Hieracium stramineiflorum Norrl.
- Hieracium stranigense Gottschl.
- Hieracium strengnense Sam. ex Johanss. & Hyl.
- Hieracium streptochaetum Zahn
- Hieracium striatisquameum Ohlsén
- Hieracium striatulum Dahlst.
- Hieracium strictiforme (Zahn) Roffey
- Hieracium strictipes Hyl.
- Hieracium strictoides Notø
- Hieracium strimaense Folin
- Hieracium stroemfeltii Dahlst.
- Hieracium stuebelii Hieron.
- Hieracium stupposiforme
- Hieracium stylosum Norrl.
- Hieracium stymnophytum Johanss. & Sam.
- Hieracium stypodes Omang
- Hieracium subacidotum Dahlst. ex Notø
- Hieracium subactites Omang
- Hieracium subacuens Johanss.
- Hieracium subadhalsicum Notø
- Hieracium subadsimilans Notø
- Hieracium subaequialtum Hyl.
- Hieracium subakkavarense Notø
- Hieracium subalbocinctum Notø
- Hieracium subalbovittatum Notø
- Hieracium subalpestre Norrl.
- Hieracium subamoeniflorum Notø
- Hieracium subamplifolium (Zahn) Roffey
- Hieracium subandurense (Zahn) Mateo
- Hieracium subangustiforme Notø
- Hieracium subanomoglossum Notø
- Hieracium subapicicomum Ósk.
- Hieracium subaquilonare Üksip
- Hieracium subaquilonium (Norrl.) Norrl.
- Hieracium subarctophilum Schljakov
- Hieracium subargenteum Notø
- Hieracium subargentinense Zahn
- Hieracium subasperellum (Zahn) Üksip
- Hieracium subatronitens (Dahlst.) Dahlst.
- Hieracium subaureum H.Lindb. ex Norrl.
- Hieracium subaustericeps Notø
- Hieracium subausterum (Zahn) Johanss.
- Hieracium subbathycephalum Notø
- Hieracium subbellidifolium (Zahn) Mateo
- Hieracium subbifurcatum Notø
- Hieracium subbritannicum (Ley) P.D.Sell & C.West
- Hieracium subcaesariatum (Zahn) Johanss. & Sam.
- Hieracium subcaesiiflorum Notø
- Hieracium subcaesiiforme Zahn
- Hieracium subcaesitoides Notø
- Hieracium subcaesium (Fr.) Lindeb.
- Hieracium subcanifrons Notø
- Hieracium subcanipes Dahlst.
- Hieracium subcapillans Omang
- Hieracium subcapillatum (Zahn) Johanss. & Sam.
- Hieracium subcapnotrichoides Notø
- Hieracium subcaudatulum Dahlst.
- Hieracium subcentrodes Notø
- Hieracium subchlorophaeum Schljakov
- Hieracium subchristianiense Dahlst. ex Johanss.
- Hieracium subchrysolepis Notø
- Hieracium subciliatum (Dahlst.) Dahlst.
- Hieracium subcinerascens Norrl. ex Schljakov
- Hieracium subcoactile Brenner
- Hieracium subcoalescens Brenner
- Hieracium subcompositum Üksip
- Hieracium subconfluens Notø
- Hieracium subcongenitum Ósk.
- Hieracium subconistum Norrl.
- Hieracium subconjungens Notø
- Hieracium subconspersum Johanss.
- Hieracium subconvexum Brenner
- Hieracium subcordigerum Johanss.
- Hieracium subcrassifolium (Zahn) Üksip
- Hieracium subcrassiforme (Dahlst. ex Zahn) Dahlst.
- Hieracium subcrassiusculum Brenner
- Hieracium subcrinellum McCosh
- Hieracium subcrispum (Dahlst. ex Notø) Omang
- Hieracium subcrocatum (E.F.Linton) Roffey
- Hieracium subcuneatum Notø
- Hieracium subcurvatifolium Notø
- Hieracium subcurvatoides Notø
- Hieracium subcyaneum (W.R.Linton) Pugsley
- Hieracium subdiaphanum Dahlst. ex Notø
- Hieracium subdidymocephalum Notø
- Hieracium subdiminuens Omang
- Hieracium subdurans Notø
- Hieracium subduriceps McCosh
- Hieracium subdurifrons Notø
- Hieracium subdyscimon Notø
- Hieracium subedentatum Ohlsén
- Hieracium subedentulum Johanss. & Sam.
- Hieracium subelatiforme Omang
- Hieracium subelatum
- Hieracium subellipticum Elfstr.
- Hieracium suberectum Schischk. & Steinb.
- Hieracium suberigens Brenner
- Hieracium subeversianum Vetter & Zahn
- Hieracium subexpallidum Dahlst. ex Notø
- Hieracium subextracticeps Notø
- Hieracium subfarinaceum Zahn
- Hieracium subfariniramum (Ganesch. & Zahn) Üksip
- Hieracium subfarinosiceps Schljakov
- Hieracium subfarreilimbatum Notø
- Hieracium subflexicaule (Zahn) Schljakov
- Hieracium subflexipes Brenner
- Hieracium subflorescens Brenner
- Hieracium subfrondiferum Notø
- Hieracium subfuscatiforme Norrl.
- Hieracium subfusciviride Ósk.
- Hieracium subgalbanum (Dahlst.) Üksip
- Hieracium subgemellum Notø
- Hieracium subglaberrimum (Sendtn. ex Nägeli & Peter) Zahn
- Hieracium subglandulosipes Schljakov
- Hieracium subglaucicolor Omang
- Hieracium subglaucovirens Zahn ex Johanss. & Sam.
- Hieracium subglobosum P.D.Sell & C.West
- Hieracium subglomeratulum Brenner
- Hieracium subgouanii (Zahn) Mateo
- Hieracium subgracilentipes (Zahn) Roffey
- Hieracium subgracilescens (Dahlst. ex Zahn) Notø
- Hieracium subhapalotrichum Notø
- Hieracium subhastatum Johanss. & Sam.
- Hieracium subhedyopum Notø
- Hieracium subhirsutissimum Üksip
- Hieracium subhirtum (F.Hanb.) Pugsley
- Hieracium subholophyllum Brenner
- Hieracium subhorizontale Hyl.
- Hieracium subhypochnoodes H.Lindb. ex Norrl.
- Hieracium subimandrae Üksip
- Hieracium subindutoides (Notø) Notø
- Hieracium subinforme Keld
- Hieracium subinquilinum Ohlsén
- Hieracium subintegratum Dahlst. & Enander
- Hieracium subintegrifolium Pugsley
- Hieracium subintegrum (Stenstr.) Johanss. & Sam.
- Hieracium sublacerifolium Johanss.
- Hieracium sublacistophyllum Notø
- Hieracium sublaeticeps Dahlst. ex Johanss.
- Hieracium sublasiophyllum P.D.Sell
- Hieracium sublaterale Brenner
- Hieracium subleiophyton Notø
- Hieracium sublineatum Elfstr.
- Hieracium sublineolatum (Dahlst. ex Zahn) Dahlst. ex Johanss.
- Hieracium sublissodermum Notø
- Hieracium sublividum (Dahlst.) Johanss.
- Hieracium submacropterum Omang
- Hieracium submaculigerum Schljakov
- Hieracium submammatidens Folin
- Hieracium submarginellum (Zahn) Üksip
- Hieracium submedianum (Zahn) Üksip
- Hieracium submelanolepis Schljakov
- Hieracium submerum Notø
- Hieracium submetaliceps Johanss.
- Hieracium subminutidens (Zahn) Pugsley
- Hieracium submoeanum Dahlst. ex Notø
- Hieracium submolybdinum Notø
- Hieracium submorulum Omang
- Hieracium submurorum Lindeb.
- Hieracium submutabile (Zahn) Pugsley
- Hieracium submutilatum Dahlst. ex Notø
- Hieracium subnaevosum (Johanss. ex Dahlst.) Johanss.
- Hieracium subnitens Zahn
- Hieracium subnitidum Dahlst. ex T.Tyler
- Hieracium subniviferum Schljakov
- Hieracium subnoetoii Notø
- Hieracium subnordlandicum Notø
- Hieracium subobatrescens Brenner
- Hieracium subobtextiforme Notø
- Hieracium subobtextum Omang
- Hieracium subochroglossum Notø
- Hieracium suboligopodium Notø
- Hieracium subopeatodontum Notø
- Hieracium suborarium Norrl.
- Hieracium subornatum Brenner
- Hieracium suborphnotrichum Notø
- Hieracium subortum Gus.Schneid.
- Hieracium subovaliceps Omang
- Hieracium suboxyphylloides Notø
- Hieracium subpamphili Zahn
- Hieracium subpardalinum T.E.Nilsson
- Hieracium subpatagiarium Johanss. & Sam.
- Hieracium subpatulum Zahn
- Hieracium subpellucidum Norrl.
- Hieracium subpersimile Notø
- Hieracium subphalarograptum Folin
- Hieracium subphrixocomum Note
- Hieracium subpiciniforme Notø
- Hieracium subpilulatum (Johanss.) Johanss. & Sam.
- Hieracium subpitense Omang
- Hieracium subplacerum Sam.
- Hieracium subplanifolium Pugsley
- Hieracium subplumuligerum Dahlst. ex Omang
- Hieracium subpraevalidum Notø
- Hieracium subprasinifolium Pugsley
- Hieracium subprocedens Omang
- Hieracium subprolatescens Wiinst.
- Hieracium subprolixiforme Palmgr.
- Hieracium subprolixum Notø
- Hieracium subprotractifolium Notø
- Hieracium subpulchridens Notø
- Hieracium subpulliceps Notø
- Hieracium subpunctillatum (Dahlst.) Dahlst.
- Hieracium subpunctilliferum (Zahn) Johanss.
- Hieracium subrasile H.Lindb.
- Hieracium subrigidiforme (Omang) Omang
- Hieracium subrigidum Almq. ex Dahlst.
- Hieracium subrivoense Folin
- Hieracium subrosulatum Freyn & Sint.
- Hieracium subrotundiforme Ósk.
- Hieracium subrotundum (Dahlst.) Dahlst. ex Omang
- Hieracium subrubicundum Dahlst.
- Hieracium subscabrescens Johanss. & Sam.
- Hieracium subscalenum Norrl.
- Hieracium subscoticum P.D.Sell
- Hieracium subsignatum Dahlst. ex Notø
- Hieracium subsilvaticum (Almq. ex Elfstr.) Dahlst.
- Hieracium subsimile Norrl.
- Hieracium subsinuatum Borbás
- Hieracium subsparsidens Johanss.
- Hieracium subspeireum Norrl.
- Hieracium subspiculatiforme Notø
- Hieracium substellatum Arv.-Touv. & Gaut.
- Hieracium substeloides Notø
- Hieracium substemmatinum Norrl.
- Hieracium substenolepis Notø
- Hieracium substriatulum Dahlst. ex Notø
- Hieracium substricticaule Dahlst.
- Hieracium substrictipilum Schljakov
- Hieracium substrigosum (Zahn) Roffey
- Hieracium subsuomense Norrl. & H.Lindb.
- Hieracium subtenelliceps Notø
- Hieracium subtenerescens Brenner
- Hieracium subtenue (W.R.Linton) Roffey
- Hieracium subtenuifrons P.D.Sell & D.J.Tennant
- Hieracium subterdentatum Johanss. & Sam.
- Hieracium subterscissiforme Johanss.
- Hieracium subterscissum Johanss.
- Hieracium subtilidens Brenner
- Hieracium subtilipilosum Folin
- Hieracium subtilissimum Zahn
- Hieracium subtransiens Notø
- Hieracium subtriangulatum Schljakov
- Hieracium subtruncatum Beeby
- Hieracium subtumescens Dahlst. ex Notø
- Hieracium subtumidifolium Notø
- Hieracium subtumidum Notø
- Hieracium subulatidens (Dahlst.) Johanss.
- Hieracium subulatum Folin
- Hieracium subulicuspis Sam.
- Hieracium subulosifrons Johanss.
- Hieracium subumbellatiforme Roffey
- Hieracium subumbelliferum Dahlst. ex Svensson
- Hieracium subumbricola Dahlst.
- Hieracium subverniferum (Dahlst. & Enander ex Zahn) Dahlst. & Enander ex Johanss.
- Hieracium subvillosiflorum Omang
- Hieracium subviolascentiforme (Pohle & Zahn) Üksip
- Hieracium subviridans Dahlst. ex Johanss.
- Hieracium subvladeasae Prodan
- Hieracium subvulgatiforme Wiinst.
- Hieracium subvulgatum (Dahlst.) Johanss. & Sam.
- Hieracium succisum Johanss.
- Hieracium succulentifolium Folin
- Hieracium sudermannicum Dahlst. & Malme
- Hieracium sudeticola (Zahn) Zlatník
- Hieracium sudeticum Sternb.
- Hieracium sundbergii Elfstr.
- Hieracium sunndalicum Omang
- Hieracium supernatum Johanss.
- Hieracium supertextum Dahlst.
- Hieracium suppansum (Johanss.) T.E.Nilsson
- Hieracium suppinatum Omang
- Hieracium suppleens Norrl.
- Hieracium suppressum Folin
- Hieracium supravladeasae Prodan
- Hieracium suriforme Johanss. & Sam.
- Hieracium surrejanum F.Hanb.
- Hieracium susendalicum Omang
- Hieracium sutteri Soest
- Hieracium suvwittrockianum Notø
- Hieracium svegense (Dahlst. & Enander ex Zahn) Dahlst. & Enander ex Johanss.
- Hieracium swantevitii Drenckh.
- Hieracium sychnolobum Dahlst. ex Johanss.
- Hieracium sylvularum Jord. ex Boreau
- Hieracium symmetricum Ohlsén
- Hieracium symphacelodes Omang
- Hieracium symphoreum Norrl.
- Hieracium symphytaceum Arv.-Touv.
- Hieracium symphytifolium Froel.
- Hieracium symplectum Omang
- Hieracium sympycnodes Omang
- Hieracium syncolanthum Omang
- Hieracium syncomistum Norrl. & H.Lindb.
- Hieracium synoziforme Omang
- Hieracium synozum Omang
- Hieracium syspeirozum Omang

== T ==
- Hieracium tacense Hieron.
- Hieracium taedum T.Tyler
- Hieracium taeniifolium Johanss.
- Hieracium taigense Schischk. & Serg.
- Hieracium tajanum K.Malý & Zahn
- Hieracium talasilepis Omang
- Hieracium talayonicum Mateo
- Hieracium tallenganum Zahn
- Hieracium tanaodeirum Johanss.
- Hieracium tandilense Sleumer
- Hieracium tanense Elfstr.
- Hieracium tanfiliewii Zahn ex Schljakov
- Hieracium tanycladum Omang
- Hieracium tanyclonum Ósk.
- Hieracium tanyeces Omang
- Hieracium tanyglochin Johanss.
- Hieracium tanylepis Omang
- Hieracium tanylobum (Dahlst. ex Zahn) Dahlst. ex Johanss.
- Hieracium tanymecolepis Omang
- Hieracium tanyphyllum (Dahlst. ex Zahn) T.Tyler
- Hieracium tanyphyton Omang
- Hieracium tanypterum Omang
- Hieracium tanyptortum Omang
- Hieracium tanysphyrum Omang
- Hieracium tanytrachelium Dahlst. ex Notø
- Hieracium tapeinocephalum Omang
- Hieracium taraxacifrons Ósk.
- Hieracium tardum Notø
- Hieracium tatewakii (Kudô) Tatew. & Kitam.
- Hieracium taurinense Jord.
- Hieracium tavense (W.R.Linton) Ley
- Hieracium tazense Schljakov
- Hieracium telaechmodes Omang
- Hieracium telekianum Boros & Lengyel
- Hieracium teliforme Schljakov
- Hieracium teligerum Norrl.
- Hieracium teliumbellatum Schljakov
- Hieracium temperatum Omang
- Hieracium tenebricosum Dahlst.
- Hieracium tenellifrons Wiinst.
- Hieracium tenellipes Omang
- Hieracium tenericaulescens Johanss.
- Hieracium tenericeps (Dahlst. ex Notø) Omang
- Hieracium teneripes Brenner
- Hieracium tenerisetum Brenner
- Hieracium tenerisquameum Brenner
- Hieracium tenuiceps (Dahlst.) Brenner
- Hieracium tenuidens Folin
- Hieracium tenuiflorum Arv.-Touv.
- Hieracium tenuifrons P.D.Sell & C.West
- Hieracium tenuipilum Omang
- Hieracium tenuiramum (Dahlst. & Svanlund) Johanss.
- Hieracium tenuivillosum Brenner
- Hieracium tephrellum Omang
- Hieracium tephrinoides (Dahlst. ex Zahn) Dahlst. ex Johanss.
- Hieracium tephrinum (Dahlst. ex Zahn) Dahlst. ex Johanss.
- Hieracium tephrodermum Zahn
- Hieracium tephropogon Zahn
- Hieracium tephrosoma (Nägeli & Peter) Zahn
- Hieracium teplouchovii Üksip
- Hieracium tercianum Mateo, Egido & Gómiz
- Hieracium terenochroum Omang
- Hieracium terenodes Omang
- Hieracium tericum Schljakov
- Hieracium terraccianoi Di Grist., Gottschl. & Raimondo
- Hieracium tersiflorum Norrl.
- Hieracium tersum Notø
- Hieracium tersundagense Gottschl. & Coșkunç.
- Hieracium tescorum Elfstr.
- Hieracium tetraodon Schljakov
- Hieracium texedense Pau
- Hieracium thaectolepium Dahlst.
- Hieracium thalassinum P.D.Sell
- Hieracium thalerodon Omang
- Hieracium thapsiformoides Schneider ex K.Malý
- Hieracium thegaleum Johanss.
- Hieracium thegolepis Omang
- Hieracium theiodes Omang
- Hieracium theodori Johanss. & Sam.
- Hieracium thermophilum Ósk.
- Hieracium thesauranum Gottschl.
- Hieracium thesioides Gottschl.
- Hieracium thessalonikense Gottschl. & Dunkel
- Hieracium thingvellirense Ósk.
- Hieracium tholerocephalum Omang
- Hieracium tholerotrichum Dahlst. ex Notø
- Hieracium thomasianum Zahn
- Hieracium thoolepis (Omang) Omang
- Hieracium thulense Dahlst.
- Hieracium thyraicum Błocki
- Hieracium thysanotum Johanss.
- Hieracium timanense Schljakov
- Hieracium tincticuspis Johanss.
- Hieracium tinctinervium Folin
- Hieracium titanogenes Sudre
- Hieracium tjaelderense Johanss.
- Hieracium toerense Johanss.
- Hieracium tolimense Cuatrec.
- Hieracium tolmatchevii Schljakov
- Hieracium tolstoii Fen. & Zahn
- Hieracium tolvaense Schljakov
- Hieracium tomentosum L.
- Hieracium tommasinianum K.Malý
- Hieracium tonalense Gottschl.
- Hieracium tonsilingua Norrl.
- Hieracium topicum Omang
- Hieracium tornense Brenner
- Hieracium torrepandoi Willk.
- Hieracium torrigliense Gottschl.
- Hieracium tortifrons Dahlst. ex Johanss. & Sam.
- Hieracium tortumense Gottschl. & Pils
- Hieracium tortuosum Zlatník
- Hieracium toscoemilianum Gottschl.
- Hieracium tossalense Mateo
- Hieracium tottoense McCosh
- Hieracium toutonianum (Zahn) Zahn
- Hieracium trachlosimum Johanss. & Sam.
- Hieracium tractum Notø
- Hieracium traditum Notø
- Hieracium traillii Greene
- Hieracium transibericum Mateo, L.Sáez, Egido & Gómiz
- Hieracium transiens (Freyn) Freyn
- Hieracium transientiforme Omang
- Hieracium transnivense Schljakov
- Hieracium transpeczoricum Schljakov
- Hieracium transtrandense T.Tyler
- Hieracium transylvanicum Heuff.
- Hieracium triadanum Zahn
- Hieracium triangulare (Almq.) Norrl.
- Hieracium triangularifolium P.D.Sell
- Hieracium triangulariforme Johanss.
- Hieracium tricantabricum Mateo & Egido
- Hieracium trichobrachium Üksip
- Hieracium trichocauloides (Dahlst. ex Zahn) Dahlst. ex Johanss.
- Hieracium trichocaulon (Dahlst.) Johanss.
- Hieracium trichodontum (Sch.Bip.) Rusby
- Hieracium trichodoroides Omang
- Hieracium trichodoronicum Arv.-Touv. & Gaut.
- Hieracium trichodorum Omang
- Hieracium trichoglossum Dahlst. ex Omang
- Hieracium trichomaurum Norrl.
- Hieracium trichophyton (Elfstr.) Nordh.
- Hieracium trichoplethes Omang
- Hieracium trichopleum Omang
- Hieracium trichotulum Omang
- Hieracium trichotum (Dahlst.) Dahlst.
- Hieracium tricolorans (Zahn) Pugsley
- Hieracium trigonoides Brenner
- Hieracium trikalense Buttler
- Hieracium trilegionense Mateo & Egido
- Hieracium tripes Folin
- Hieracium trischistum Nyár. & Zahn
- Hieracium triste Willd. ex Spreng.
- Hieracium tristiceps Dahlst.
- Hieracium tristicolor Ohlsén
- Hieracium tritum Üksip
- Hieracium trivialiforme Schljakov
- Hieracium trochophyllum Omang
- Hieracium troctophyllum Omang
- Hieracium tromsdalense Notø
- Hieracium trondense Omang
- Hieracium truncatum Lindeb.
- Hieracium trunciceps Sam.
- Hieracium truttae Gottschl.
- Hieracium tuadaschense Schljakov
- Hieracium tubaticeps Johanss.
- Hieracium tuberculatum Freyn
- Hieracium tucumanicum (Zahn) Sleumer
- Hieracium tuixentianum Mateo
- Hieracium tuizanum Mateo, Egido & Gómiz
- Hieracium tulomense Schljakov
- Hieracium tumescens Norrl.
- Hieracium tumidoides Notø
- Hieracium tumidum Dahlst. ex Notø
- Hieracium tunense Johanss. & Sam.
- Hieracium tunguskanum Ganesh. & Zahn
- Hieracium turbidum Norrl.
- Hieracium turbinellum Zahn
- Hieracium turbineum Norrl.
- Hieracium turbinicephalum Wiinst.
- Hieracium turbiniceps Dahlst.
- Hieracium turcomanicum Gand.
- Hieracium turliense Omang
- Hieracium turritellum Omang
- Hieracium tuvinicum Krasnob. & Shaulo
- Hieracium tynnoglochin Ósk.
- Hieracium tynnotrichum Dahlst.
- Hieracium tytthopogon Hyl.

== U ==
- Hieracium ubiniense Mateo, Egido & Alejandre
- Hieracium uechtritzianum Gus.Schneid.
- Hieracium ueksipii Schljakov
- Hieracium ugandiense Üksip
- Hieracium uiginskyense Pugsley
- Hieracium uistense (Pugsley) P.D.Sell & C.West
- Hieracium uisticola Pugsley
- Hieracium ukierniae Woł. & Zahn
- Hieracium ulocomum Johanss. & Sam.
- Hieracium ulotetodes Omang
- Hieracium ulothrix Norrl.
- Hieracium ulotrichum (Dahlst. ex Zahn) Dahlst. ex Johanss.
- Hieracium uluthrix Norrl.
- Hieracium umbellascens Omang
- Hieracium umbellaticeps (Pohle & Zahn) Üksip
- Hieracium umbellatiforme Omang
- Hieracium umbellatum L.
- Hieracium umbricinum Mateo & Egido
- Hieracium umbricola Saelan ex Norrl.
- Hieracium umbricoliforme Johanss.
- Hieracium umbrolainzii Mateo & Egido
- Hieracium umbrolympicum Gottschl. & Dunkel
- Hieracium umbrophilum Gottschl. & S.Orsenigo
- Hieracium umbrosoides Gottschl.
- Hieracium umbrosum Jord.
- Hieracium uncosum Johanss.
- Hieracium unctiusculum (Johanss.) Johanss. & Sam.
- Hieracium undulidens Folin
- Hieracium unguiculatum Hyl.
- Hieracium unguiculiferum Omang
- Hieracium unguiculosum Omang
- Hieracium unguiferum Hyl.
- Hieracium unifolium Omang
- Hieracium uralense Elfstr.
- Hieracium urbionicum Pau ex Mateo
- Hieracium urceolarium Omang
- Hieracium urdialesianum Mateo, Egido & Gómiz
- Hieracium urolepium (Dahlst. ex Zahn) Omang
- Hieracium urrobense (de Retz) Mateo & Egido
- Hieracium urticaceum Arv.-Touv. & Ravaud
- Hieracium urumoffii Nejceff & Zahn
- Hieracium urusianum Mateo, Egido & Gómiz
- Hieracium ustedalicum Omang
- Hieracium usticollum Johanss.
- Hieracium ustistylum Omang

== V ==
- Hieracium vaerendicum Johanss.
- Hieracium vagae Üksip
- Hieracium vagense (F.Hanb.) Ley
- Hieracium vagicola P.D.Sell
- Hieracium vagidens Omang
- Hieracium vaginifolium Arv.-Touv.
- Hieracium vagneri Pax
- Hieracium vaidae Üksip
- Hieracium valdeglandulosum Brenner
- Hieracium valdeonense Mateo, Egido & Gómiz
- Hieracium valdepilosum Vill.
- Hieracium valdeplicatum Folin
- Hieracium valentinum Pau
- Hieracium valentius Johanss.
- Hieracium valgescens Johanss. & Sam.
- Hieracium valgidentatum Johanss. & Sam.
- Hieracium validipolum Omang
- Hieracium valirense Arv.-Touv. & Gaut.
- Hieracium vallense Omang
- Hieracium vallfogonense Mateo, Egido & Gómiz
- Hieracium vallicola Omang
- Hieracium valoddae Zahn
- Hieracium vangense Omang
- Hieracium vapenicanum (Lengyel & Zahn) Chrtek f. & Mráz
- Hieracium varangerense (Elfstr.) Elfstr.
- Hieracium variable Lönnr.
- Hieracium varianellum Notø
- Hieracium varianifolium Johanss.
- Hieracium varianum Johanss.
- Hieracium variiceps Brenner
- Hieracium variicolor Stenstr. ex Dahlst.
- Hieracium variifolium P.D.Sell & C.West
- Hieracium variifrons Brenner
- Hieracium variiglandulum Folin
- Hieracium varsugae Schljakov
- Hieracium vasconicum Jord. ex Martrin-Donos
- Hieracium vasculum Norrl.
- Hieracium vassendliense Omang
- Hieracium vastulum Johanss. & Sam.
- Hieracium vatricosum Dahlst.
- Hieracium vegaradanum de Retz
- Hieracium velebiticum Degen & Zahn
- Hieracium velenovskyanum Zlatník
- Hieracium vellereum Scheele ex Fries
- Hieracium venetifolium Johanss. & Sam.
- Hieracium venezuelanum Arv.-Touv.
- Hieracium vennicontium Pugsley
- Hieracium venostorum (Zahn) Gottschl.
- Hieracium venosum L.
- Hieracium ventanianum Mateo, Egido & Gómiz
- Hieracium venticaesum Gottschl.
- Hieracium venustulum Norrl.
- Hieracium verbascifolium Vill.
- Hieracium veresczaginii Schischk. & Serg.
- Hieracium vermiense Gottschl. & Dunkel
- Hieracium vermlandicum (Dahlst. ex Zahn) Dahlst. ex Johanss.
- Hieracium verniferum Johanss.
- Hieracium versatum Notø
- Hieracium vervoorstii Sleumer
- Hieracium vescum Notø
- Hieracium vesticeps Brenner
- Hieracium vestipes Schljakov
- Hieracium vestitum Gren. & Godr.
- Hieracium vestmannicum (Dahlst.) Dahlst. ex Johanss.
- Hieracium vestrogothicum T.E.Nilsson
- Hieracium veterascens Dahlst.
- Hieracium vetlandaense T.E.Nilsson
- Hieracium vetteri (Zahn) Ronniger
- Hieracium vexillatum T.Tyler
- Hieracium viburgense Norrl.
- Hieracium vicarium (Norrl.) Brenner
- Hieracium victoriae T.Tyler
- Hieracium vietulifolium (Johanss. & Sam.) T.Tyler
- Hieracium vikense Ósk.
- Hieracium viladrauense Mateo, Egido & Gómiz
- Hieracium villamaniniense Mateo & Egido
- Hieracium villanuense Mateo, Egido & Gómiz
- Hieracium villosum Jacq.
- Hieracium vinaceiforme Johanss. & Sam.
- Hieracium vinaceum Johanss. & Sam.
- Hieracium vindobonense Wiesb. ex Dichtl
- Hieracium vinicaule P.D.Sell & C.West
- Hieracium vinifolium P.D.Sell
- Hieracium violascentiforme (Pohle & Zahn) Üksip
- Hieracium virentulum Notø
- Hieracium virgicaule Nägeli & Peter
- Hieracium viriatum Johanss. & Sam.
- Hieracium viride Arv.-Touv.
- Hieracium viridicaniceps Folin
- Hieracium viridicantabricum Mateo & Egido
- Hieracium viridistylum Notø
- Hieracium virosum Pall.
- Hieracium vischerae Üksip
- Hieracium viscosum Arv.-Touv.
- Hieracium visontinum Mateo
- Hieracium vitellicolor Elfstr.
- Hieracium vitreicuspis Folin
- Hieracium vittatulum Dahlst.
- Hieracium vivantii (de Retz) de Retz
- Hieracium vladeasae Prodan
- Hieracium vladimirovii Szeląg
- Hieracium vogarense Ósk.
- Hieracium volaiense Gottschl.
- Hieracium vollmannii Zahn
- Hieracium volutiferum Johanss.
- Hieracium vorlichense P.D.Sell
- Hieracium vulgatifolium Norrl.
- Hieracium vulsum (Elfstr.) Schljakov
- Hieracium vurtopicum Zahn

== W ==
- Hieracium wainioi Norrl.
- Hieracium waldsteinii Tausch
- Hieracium warmingii Baker
- Hieracium weberbauerianum Zahn
- Hieracium wendelianum Hyl.
- Hieracium westii P.D.Sell
- Hieracium wettsteinianum Hayek & Zahn
- Hieracium wichurae Zahn
- Hieracium wierzbickii Szeląg
- Hieracium wiinstedtii Keld
- Hieracium wilczekianum Arv.-Touv.
- Hieracium wilczekii Zahn
- Hieracium wojcickii Szeląg
- Hieracium wolczankense Üksip
- Hieracium wolffii Zahn
- Hieracium wolfii Johanss. & Sam.
- Hieracium wologdense (Pohle & Zahn) Üksip
- Hieracium woloszczakii Kulcz.
- Hieracium worochtae Woł. ex Zahn
- Hieracium wysokae (Woł. & Zahn) Schljakov

== X ==
- Hieracium xanthicum Gottschl. & Dunkel
- Hieracium xanthochlorum T.E.Nilsson
- Hieracium xanthophytum Johanss. & Sam.
- Hieracium xanthoprasinophyes Zahn
- Hieracium xanthostylum (Dahlst.) Dahlst. ex Johanss. & Sam.
- Hieracium xekense Mateo & Egido
- Hieracium xenophytum Hyl.
- Hieracium xerampelinum Johanss. & Sam.
- Hieracium xerophilum Norrl.
- Hieracium xestocarenum Johanss.
- Hieracium xiphophyllum Omang
- Hieracium xystophorum Johanss. & Sam.

== Y ==
- Hieracium yxnerumense Hyl.

== Z ==
- Hieracium zajacii Szeląg
- Hieracium zelenaglavense Jasiewicz & Pawł.
- Hieracium zelencense Schljakov
- Hieracium zetlandicum Beeby
- Hieracium zinserlingianum Üksip
- Hieracium zinserlingii Schljakov
- Hieracium zonulatiforme Johanss. & Sam.
- Hieracium zonulatum Johanss. & Sam.
- Hieracium zophothrincum Omang
- Hieracium zygophorum Hyl.
