= Hieracium hibernicyclicum =

Scientific classification
- Kingdom: Plantae
- Clade: Tracheophytes
- Clade: Angiosperms
- Clade: Eudicots
- Clade: Asterids
- Order: Asterales
- Family: Asteraceae
- Genus: Hieracium
- Species: H. hibernicyclicum

Binomial name
- Hieracium hibernicyclicum T.C.G.Rich

Species of flowering plant

Hieracium hibernicyclicum, the Irish round-leaved hawkweed, is a species of hawkweed in the genus Hieracium, endemic to the north of Ireland.
