= Hieracium debile =

Conservation status
- Critically Endangered (IUCN 3.1)

Scientific classification
- Kingdom: Plantae
- Clade: Tracheophytes
- Clade: Angiosperms
- Clade: Eudicots
- Clade: Asterids
- Order: Asterales
- Family: Asteraceae
- Genus: Hieracium
- Species: H. debile

Binomial name
- Hieracium debile Fr.
- Hieracium debile distribution

Species of flowering plant

Hieracium debile is a forb of genus Hieracium in the family Asteraceae, and was found only in Ecuador, in two separate collections gathered more than a century ago by W. Jameson. Its natural habitat is subtropical or tropical high-elevation grassland at elevations between 3,500 m (11,483 ft) to 4,000 m (13,123 ft) but the exact location is unknown as the label in the collections says only "In summis alpibus Quitensibus".

Hieracium debile is threatened only by habitat loss and is not known to be living in any protected areas.
