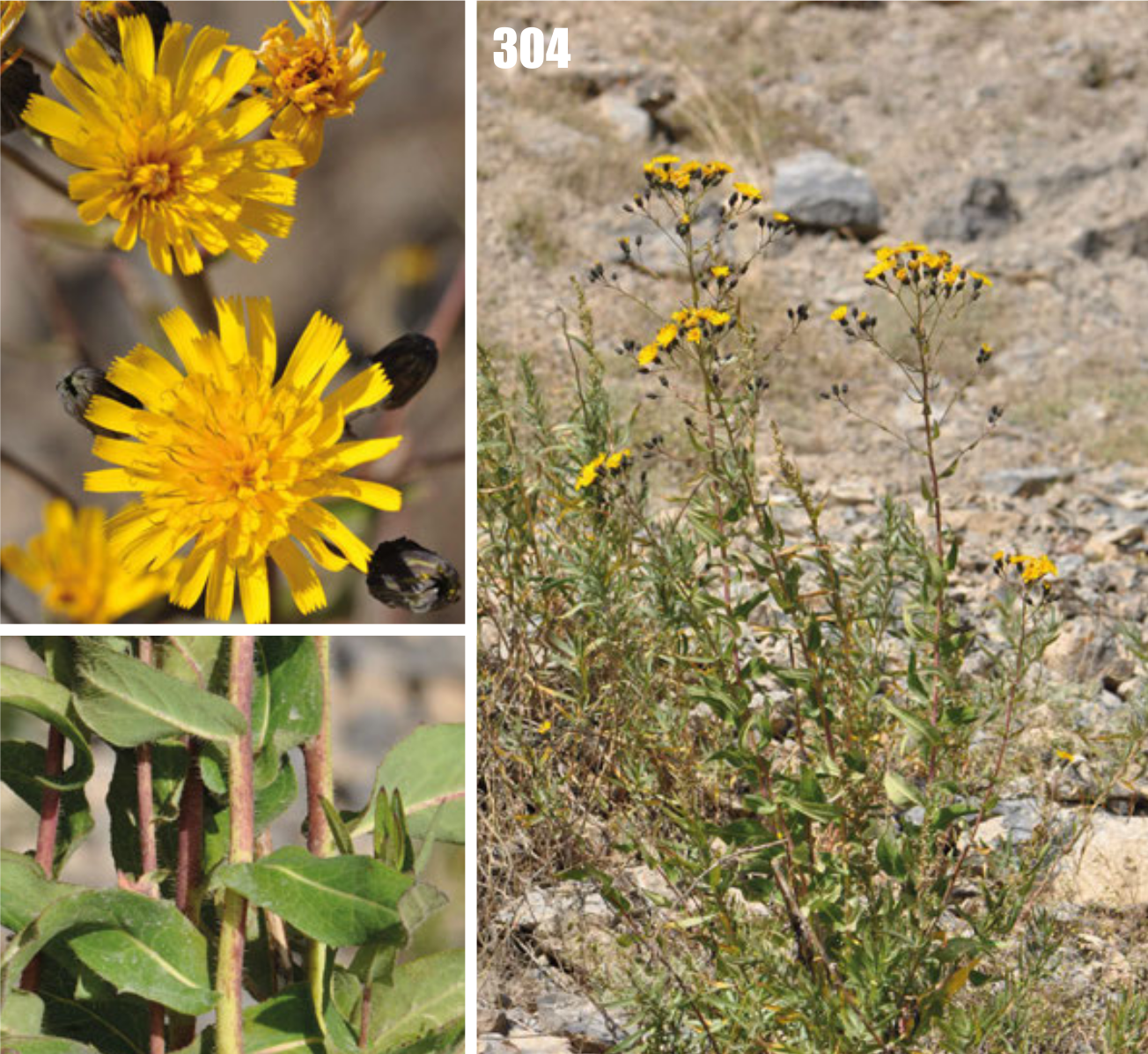
- Hieracium virosum

Scientific classification
- Kingdom: Plantae
- Clade: Tracheophytes
- Clade: Angiosperms
- Clade: Eudicots
- Clade: Asterids
- Order: Asterales
- Family: Asteraceae
- Genus: Hieracium
- Species: H. virosum

Binomial name
- Hieracium virosum Pall.

Synonyms
- Hieracium corymbosum Pers.; Hieracium foliosum Willd.; Hieracium virosum var. latifolium Trautv.; Hieracium virosum var. oblongifolium Trautv.; Hieracium virosum var. undulatifolium Trautv.

= Hieracium virosum =

Species of plant

Hieracium virosum is a species of flowering plant in the hawkweed genus Hieracium (family Asteraceae). It is native to non-arid temperate areas of Eurasia, from southeastern and eastern Europe, Central Asia, across Siberia, Mongolia, northern China, and as far as Sakhalin island. A perennial of the steppes and forest-steppes, it is not apomictic.

== Subtaxa ==
The following subspecies are accepted:

- Hieracium virosum subsp. foliosum (Willd.) Zahn – the former Yugoslavia, Bulgaria, Romania, Ukraine
- Hieracium virosum subsp. virosum – entire range, except Bulgaria
