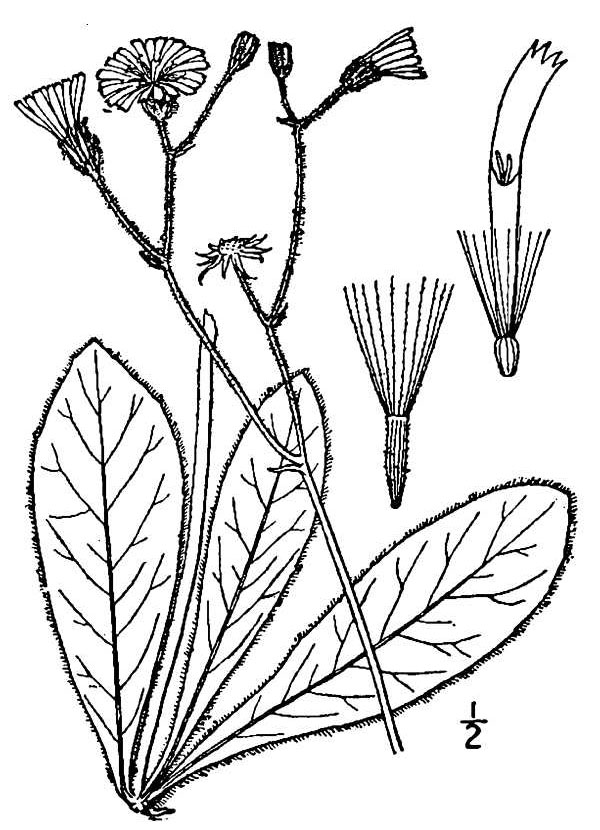
- 1913 illustration

Scientific classification
- Kingdom: Plantae
- Clade: Tracheophytes
- Clade: Angiosperms
- Clade: Eudicots
- Clade: Asterids
- Order: Asterales
- Family: Asteraceae
- Genus: Hieracium
- Species: H. traillii

Binomial name
- Hieracium traillii Greene 1900

Synonyms
- Hieracium greenii Porter & Britton 1893 not H. greenei; Pilosella spathulata F.W.Schultz & Sch.Bip. 1862 not Hieracium spathulatum Scheele 1863

= Hieracium traillii =

Species of flowering plant

Hieracium traillii is a species of hawkweed known by the common name Maryland hawkweed.

Hieracium traillii grows in the eastern United States, primarily in the central Appalachian Mountains of Pennsylvania, Maryland, Virginia, and West Virginia, with some populations farther west in Ohio and Kentucky.

Hieracium traillii is a small hawkweed forming a basal rosette of densely hairy gray-green leaves, each up to 8 centimeters (3.2 inches) long and some with toothed edges. It bolts a thin, hairy stem which reaches 60 centimeters (2 feet) tall. The stem bears an inflorescence of several flower heads containing yellow ray flowers but no disc flowers. The fruit is a ribbed achene about half a centimeter (0.2 inches) long with a light brown pappus.
