= Hieracium rossicum =

Scientific classification
- Kingdom: Plantae
- Clade: Tracheophytes
- Clade: Angiosperms
- Clade: Eudicots
- Clade: Asterids
- Order: Asterales
- Family: Asteraceae
- Genus: Hieracium
- Species: H. rossicum

Binomial name
- Hieracium rossicum Schljakov, 1975

Species of flowering plant

Hieracium rossicum is a species of flowering plant belonging to the family Asteraceae.

It is native to Eastern Europe.
