= Hieracium hethlandiae =

Scientific classification
- Kingdom: Plantae
- Clade: Tracheophytes
- Clade: Angiosperms
- Clade: Eudicots
- Clade: Asterids
- Order: Asterales
- Family: Asteraceae
- Genus: Hieracium
- Species: H. hethlandiae

Binomial name
- Hieracium hethlandiae (F.Hanb.) Pugsley

Synonyms
- Hieracium dovrense var. hethlandiae F.Hanb.

Species of plant

Hieracium hethlandiae, known as Cliva Hill hawkweed, is a species of hawkweed native to Shetland. The species was first published in 1946.

The species was endemic to a localized region of rocky slopes near Mavis Grind. Already threatened due to overgrazing by sheep, it was declared extinct in the wild after habitat disruption due to quarrying in the 1980s.

Before the only known wild population was destroyed, botanist Walter Scott harvested and cultivated specimens of Hieracium hethlandiae. An authority on Hieracium, Scott was awarded an MBE for his conservation efforts in 1996. Although it was declared extinct by the National Biodiversity Network, in 2015 the species was reintroduced to the wild on a site geologically similar to where it was originally found.
