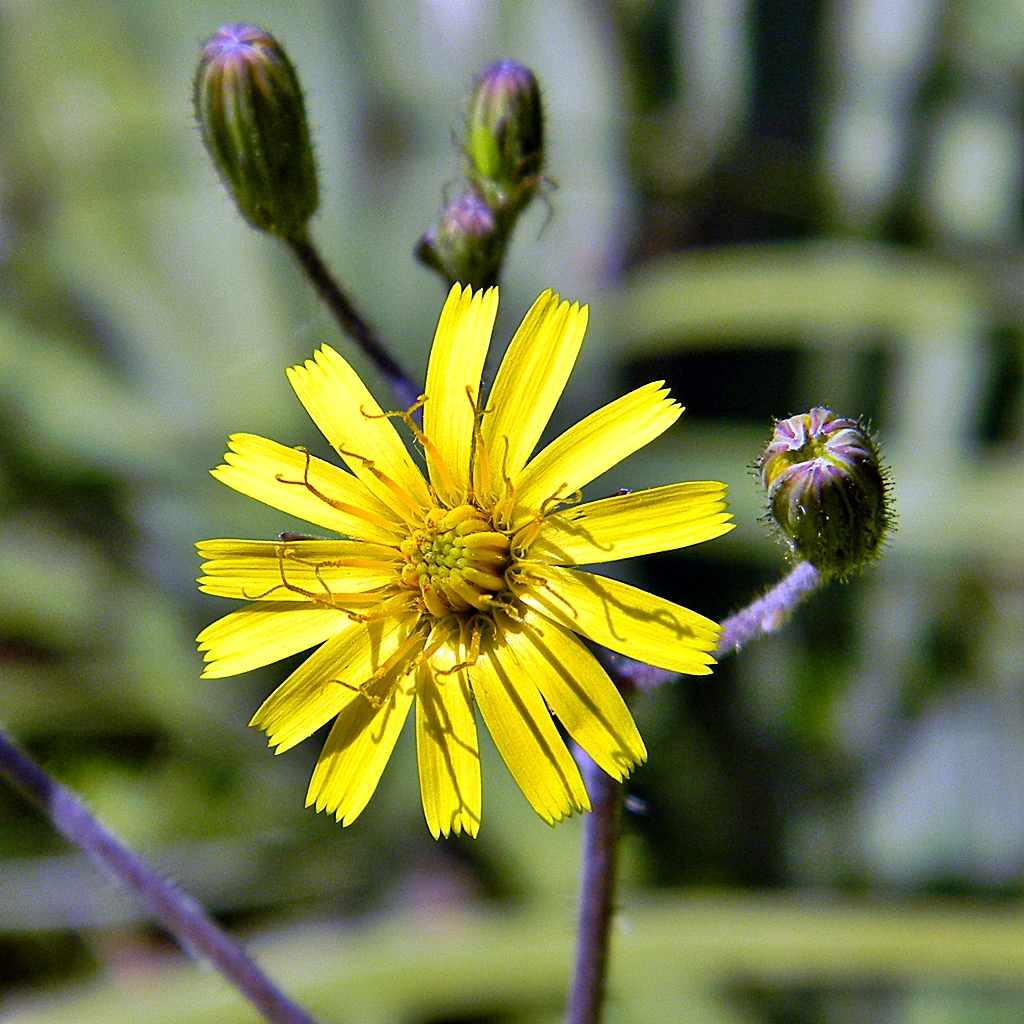

Conservation status
- Apparently Secure (NatureServe)

Scientific classification
- Kingdom: Plantae
- Clade: Tracheophytes
- Clade: Angiosperms
- Clade: Eudicots
- Clade: Asterids
- Order: Asterales
- Family: Asteraceae
- Genus: Hieracium
- Species: H. megacephalum

Binomial name
- Hieracium megacephalum Nash 1895

Synonyms
- Hieracium megacephalon Nash

= Hieracium megacephalum =

Species of flowering plant

Hieracium megacephalum, the coastal plain hawkweed or bigheaded hawkweed, is a North American plant species in the tribe Cichorieae within the family Asteraceae. It grows only in the southeastern United States, in Georgia, Florida, and the Carolinas.

Hieracium megacephalum is an herb up to 40 cm (16 in) tall, with leaves on the stem and also in a rosette at the bottom. Leaves are up to 120 mm (4.7 in) long, sometimes with teeth on the edges. One stalk can produce as many as 50 flower heads in a flat-topped array. Each head has 20–50 yellow ray flowers but no disc flowers.
