= Hieracium bakerianum =

Scientific classification
- Kingdom: Plantae
- Clade: Tracheophytes
- Clade: Angiosperms
- Clade: Eudicots
- Clade: Asterids
- Order: Asterales
- Family: Asteraceae
- Genus: Hieracium
- Species: H. bakerianum

Binomial name
- Hieracium bakerianum Pugsley

Species of plant

Hieracium bakerianum is a species of hawkweed.

The species is named in honor of botanist John Gilbert Baker.

== Range ==
It is native to Great Britain.
