= Hieracium bolanderi =

Scientific classification
- Kingdom: Plantae
- Clade: Tracheophytes
- Clade: Angiosperms
- Clade: Eudicots
- Clade: Asterids
- Order: Asterales
- Family: Asteraceae
- Genus: Hieracium
- Species: H. bolanderi

Binomial name
- Hieracium bolanderi A.Gray 1868

Synonyms
- Hieracium siskiyouense M.Peck

Species of flowering plant

Hieracium bolanderi or Bolander's hawkweed is a North American plant species in the tribe Cichorieae within the family Asteraceae. It is found primarily in the mountains of Western Oregon and Northern California in the United States, although there are reports of the species further south in the San Bernardino Mountains in Southern California and also in Baja California in Mexico.

Hieracium bolanderi is a herb up to 60 cm (2.0 ft) tall, with leaves mostly in a rosette at the bottom. Leaves are up to 95 mm (3.7 in) long, with no teeth on the edges. One stalk will produce 3-40 flower heads in a flat-topped array. Each head has 6-12 yellow ray flowers, but no disc flowers.
