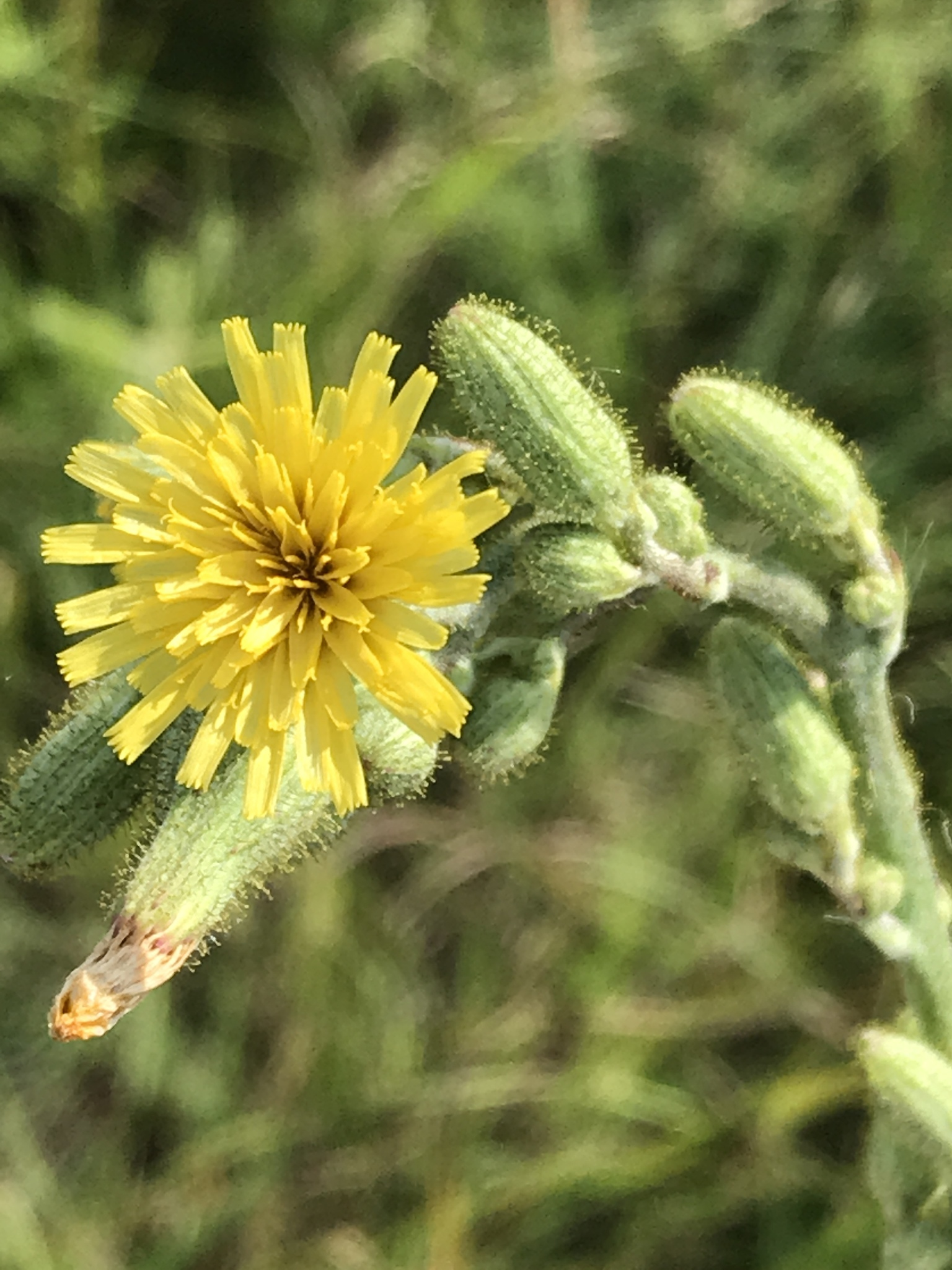

Scientific classification
- Kingdom: Plantae
- Clade: Tracheophytes
- Clade: Angiosperms
- Clade: Eudicots
- Clade: Asterids
- Order: Asterales
- Family: Asteraceae
- Genus: Hieracium
- Species: H. longipilum

Binomial name
- Hieracium longipilum Torr. ex Hook. 1833

= Hieracium longipilum =

Species of flowering plant

Hieracium longipilum, the hairy hawkweed, is a North American plant species in the tribe Cichorieae within the family Asteraceae. It is widespread across much of central Canada and the central United States from Ontario south to Texas and Louisiana. There are old reports of the species growing in Québec, but apparently does not grow there now.

Hieracium longipilum is an herb up to 200 cm (79 in) or 6 2/3 feet) tall, with leaves in a rosette at the bottom and also along the stem. Leaves, stems, and the bracts surrounding the flower heads are covered with long and conspicuous hairs up to 15 mm (0.59 in) long. Leaves are up to 25 cm (9.8 in) long, with no teeth on the edges. One stalk will produce 10-12 flower heads in a conical or nearly cylindrical array. Each head has 30-60 yellow ray flowers but no disc flowers.
