= Hieracium transiens =

Scientific classification
- Kingdom: Plantae
- Clade: Tracheophytes
- Clade: Angiosperms
- Clade: Eudicots
- Clade: Asterids
- Order: Asterales
- Family: Asteraceae
- Genus: Hieracium
- Species: H. transiens

Binomial name
- Hieracium transiens (Freyn) Freyn

Subspecies
- List: Hieracium transiens subsp. abatanum (Hayek & Zahn) Greuter; Hieracium transiens subsp. acrocymum (Zahn) Greuter; Hieracium transiens subsp. aculeatissimum (Zahn) Greuter; Hieracium transiens subsp. albanicomacedonicum (O.Behr, E.Behr & Zahn) Greuter; Hieracium transiens subsp. albellipes (Schelk. & Zahn) Greuter; Hieracium transiens subsp. amphitephrodes (Sosn. & Zahn) Greuter; Hieracium transiens subsp. artabirense (Zahn) Greuter; Hieracium transiens subsp. asterocymum (Urum. & Zahn) Greuter; Hieracium transiens subsp. austromontenegrinum (O.Behr, E.Behr & Zahn) Greuter; Hieracium transiens subsp. autranii (Post) Greuter; Hieracium transiens subsp. balakderense (T.Georgiev & Zahn) Greuter; Hieracium transiens subsp. brandisianum (Zahn) Greuter; Hieracium transiens subsp. calomeres (Urum. & Zahn) Greuter; Hieracium transiens subsp. caloprasinum (Zahn) Greuter; Hieracium transiens subsp. ceahlavicum (Zahn) Greuter; Hieracium transiens subsp. cinereisquamum (Nejceff & Zahn) Greuter; Hieracium transiens subsp. cryptonaevum (Bornm. & Zahn) Greuter; Hieracium transiens subsp. erythrocarpoides (Litv. & Zahn) Greuter; Hieracium transiens subsp. erythrocarpum (Peter) Greuter; Hieracium transiens subsp. excentricum Gottschl. & Dunkel; Hieracium transiens subsp. glomerellum (Litv. & Zahn) Greuter; Hieracium transiens subsp. heterodontoides (Litv. & Zahn) Greuter; Hieracium transiens subsp. heterodontoidiforme (Zahn) Greuter; Hieracium transiens subsp. hypopoliocranum (T.Georgiev & Zahn) Greuter; Hieracium transiens subsp. incomptum (Nejceff & Zahn) Greuter; Hieracium transiens subsp. insolitum (Zahn) Greuter; Hieracium transiens subsp. karagoellense (Zahn) Greuter; Hieracium transiens subsp. karakolense (Bornm. & Zahn) Greuter; Hieracium transiens subsp. kurvalae (Rech.f. & Zahn) Greuter; Hieracium transiens subsp. laxifurcans (Bornm. & Zahn) Greuter; Hieracium transiens subsp. leilae (Rech.f. & Zahn) Greuter; Hieracium transiens subsp. leptobrachiopsis (Zahn) Greuter; Hieracium transiens subsp. levimaculatum Gottschl. & Melikoki; Hieracium transiens subsp. liberatidens (T.Georgiev & Zahn) Greuter; Hieracium transiens subsp. macrolepidiforme (Zahn) Greuter; Hieracium transiens subsp. macrolepioides (Zahn) Greuter; Hieracium transiens subsp. mallopoderes (Bornm. & Zahn) Greuter; Hieracium transiens subsp. mallopodioides (Zahn) Greuter; Hieracium transiens subsp. melanocarpum (Zahn) Greuter; Hieracium transiens subsp. microtricholepium (T.Georgiev & Zahn) Greuter; Hieracium transiens subsp. orthomeres (Urum. & Zahn) Greuter; Hieracium transiens subsp. petrohanicum (Urum. & Zahn) Greuter; Hieracium transiens subsp. phaedrochlorum (Nyár. & Zahn) Greuter; Hieracium transiens subsp. pollichiotropium (T.Georgiev & Zahn) Greuter; Hieracium transiens subsp. pseudogypsophyllum (Nyár. & Zahn) Greuter; Hieracium transiens subsp. pycnadenium (Degen & Zahn) Greuter; Hieracium transiens subsp. samurense (Zahn) Greuter; Hieracium transiens subsp. sintenisii (Zahn) Greuter; Hieracium transiens subsp. stellidorsum (Bornm. & Zahn) Greuter; Hieracium transiens subsp. stribrnyanum (T.Georgiev & Zahn) Greuter; Hieracium transiens subsp. transiens; Hieracium transiens subsp. variegatisquamum (Zahn) Greuter; Hieracium transiens subsp. winklerianum (Zahn) Greuter; Hieracium transiens subsp. xanthodermum (Zahn) Greuter; Hieracium transiens subsp. zygosense (Zahn) Greuter

Synonyms
- Hieracium subvillosum var. transiens Freyn

Species of plant

Hieracium transiens is a species of flowering plant in the family Asteraceae, native to south-eastern Europe, Turkey, the Caucasus and Kazakhstan. It was first described by Josef Franz Freyn in 1891 as Hieracium subvillosum var. transiens before he raised it to a full species in 1894. More than 50 subspecies were accepted in 2024, many of which, such as Hieracium insolitum, had previously been treated as full species.

== Subspecies ==
As of October 2024, Plants of the World Online accepted 55 subspecies. Most of these were transferred from Hieracium erythrocarpum when this species was reduced to H. transiens subsp. erythrocarpum in 2007. Many of the subspecies had also been treated as independent species. For example, H. transiens subsp. insolitum was first described in 1912 as H. erythrocarpum subsp. insolitum before being raised to the full species H. insolitum in 1960.
