= Hieracium crepidispermum =

Scientific classification
- Kingdom: Plantae
- Clade: Tracheophytes
- Clade: Angiosperms
- Clade: Eudicots
- Clade: Asterids
- Order: Asterales
- Family: Asteraceae
- Genus: Hieracium
- Species: H. crepidispermum

Binomial name
- Hieracium crepidispermum Fr. 1848

Synonyms
- Hieracium lemmonii A.Gray; Heteropleura crepidisperma (Fr.) Sch.Bip.; Stenotheca crepidisperma (Fr.) Sennikov

Species of flowering plant

Hieracium crepidispermum is a North American plant species in the tribe Cichorieae within the family Asteraceae. It is widespread across much of Mexico and found also in the US states of Arizona and New Mexico.

Hieracium crepidispermum is an herb up to 100 cm (39 in) tall, with leaves mostly in a rosette at the bottom. Leaves are up to 85 mm (3.3 in) long, sometimes with small teeth on the edges. One stalk will produce 8-25 flower heads in a flat-topped array. Each head has 25–40 white or pale yellow ray flowers but no disc flowers.
