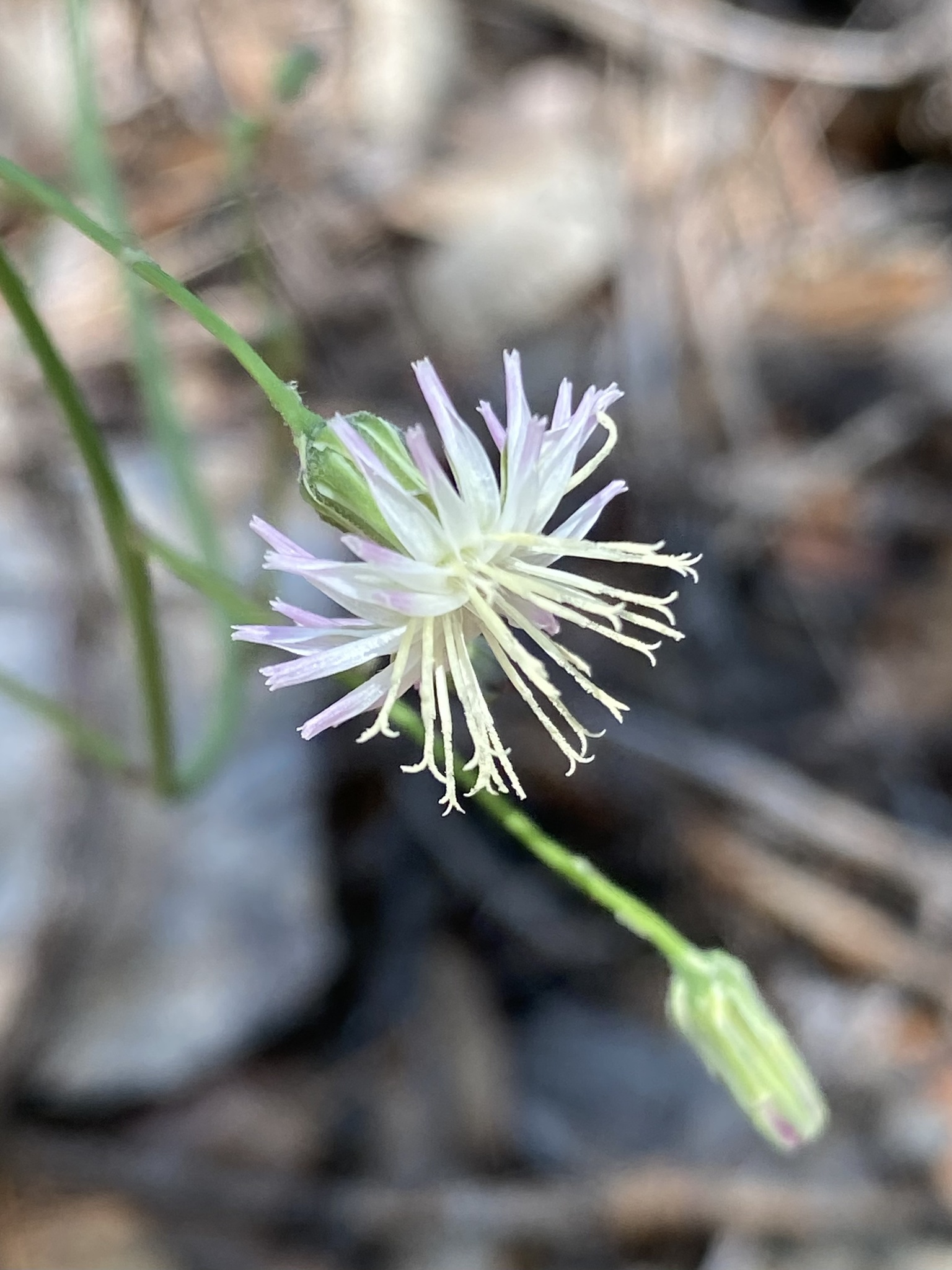

Scientific classification
- Kingdom: Plantae
- Clade: Tracheophytes
- Clade: Angiosperms
- Clade: Eudicots
- Clade: Asterids
- Order: Asterales
- Family: Asteraceae
- Genus: Hieracium
- Species: H. carneum

Binomial name
- Hieracium carneum Greene

= Hieracium carneum =

Species of flowering plant

Hieracium carneum, common name Huachuca hawkweed, is a North American plant species in the family Asteraceae, native to Arizona, New Mexico, Texas and Chihuahua. It grows on rocky sites at elevations of 2,000–2,300 m (6,600–7,500 ft).

Hieracium carneum is an herb up to 60 cm (24 in) tall. Leaves are lanceolate to linear, up to 12 cm (4.7 in) long. Flower heads contain white to pinkish ray flowers but no disc flowers.
