= Hieracium greenei =

Scientific classification
- Kingdom: Plantae
- Clade: Tracheophytes
- Clade: Angiosperms
- Clade: Eudicots
- Clade: Asterids
- Order: Asterales
- Family: Asteraceae
- Genus: Hieracium
- Species: H. greenei

Binomial name
- Hieracium greenei Gray

Synonyms
- Hieracium oregonicum Zahn

Species of flowering plant

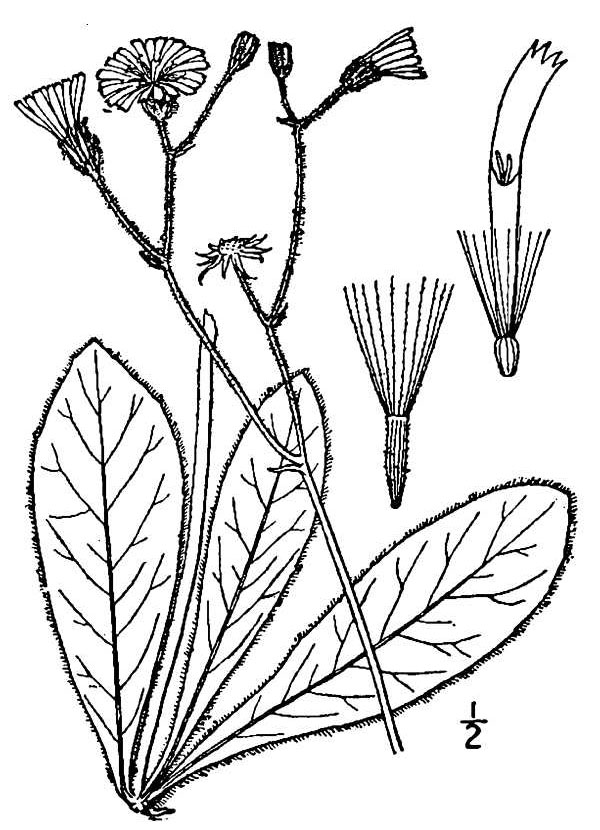
An illustration of Greene’s Hawkweed

Hieracium greenei (not to be confused with Hieracium greenii) is a species of hawkweed known by the common name Greene's hawkweed.

Hieracium greenei is native to the forests of the Klamath Mountains and neighboring ranges in southern Oregon and northern California.

Hieracium greenei is a small hawkweed forming a basal rosette of densely hairy gray-green leaves, each 5 to 10 centimeters (2-4 inches) long and some with toothed edges. It bolts a thin, hairy stem which reaches 20 to 40 centimeters (8-16 inches) tall. The stem bears an inflorescence of several flower heads containing yellow ray flowers but no disc flowers. The fruit is a ribbed achene about half a centimeter (0.2 inches) long with a light brown pappus.
