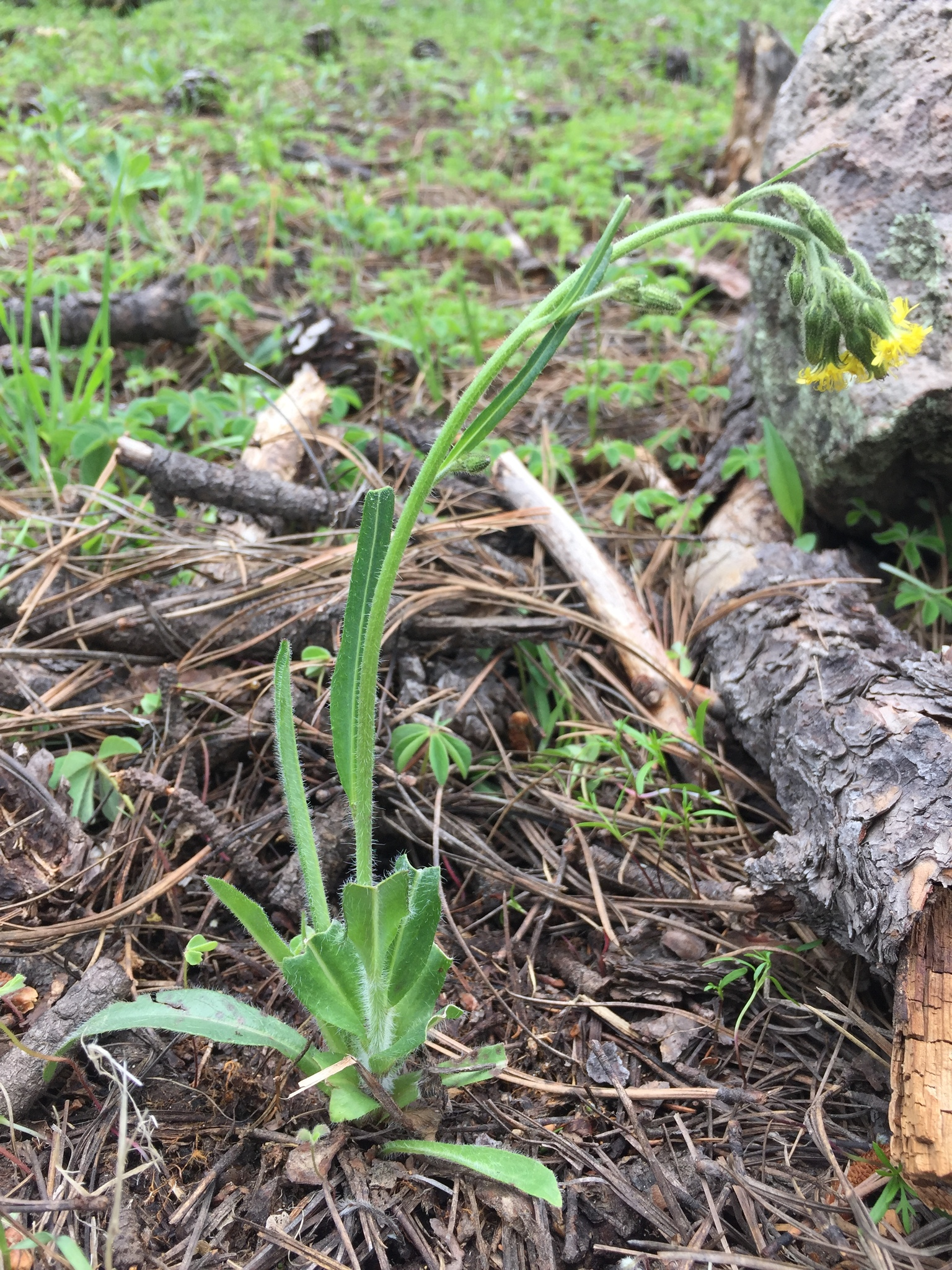

Scientific classification
- Kingdom: Plantae
- Clade: Tracheophytes
- Clade: Angiosperms
- Clade: Eudicots
- Clade: Asterids
- Order: Asterales
- Family: Asteraceae
- Genus: Hieracium
- Species: H. abscissum

Binomial name
- Hieracium abscissum Less.

Synonyms
- List: Pilosella abscissa (Less.) F.W.Schultz & Sch.Bip.; Hieracium anthurum Fr.; Hieracium comatum Fr.; Hieracium hirsutum Sessé & Moc.; Hieracium intybiforme Arv.-Touv.; Hieracium rusbyi Greene; Hieracium strigosum D.Don; Hieracium thyrsoideum Fr.; Pilosella comata (Fr.) F.W.Schultz & Sch.Bip.; Pilosella strigosa (D.Don) F.W.Schultz & Sch.Bip.; Pilosella thyrsoidea F.W.Schultz & Sch.Bip.

= Hieracium abscissum =

Species of flowering plant

Hieracium abscissum is a species of plant in the tribe Cichorieae within the family Asteraceae. It is considered to be native to the south-western United States (Arizona and New Mexico), Mexico and Central America.

Hieracium abscissum is herbaceous and up to 75 cm (30 in) tall, with leaves on the stem and also in a rosette at the bottom. Leaves are lance-shaped, up to 20 cm (7.9 in) long, sometimes with teeth along the edge. One stalk branches toward the top, producing 5-60 flower heads. Each head has 20-24 yellow ray flowers but no disc flowers.
