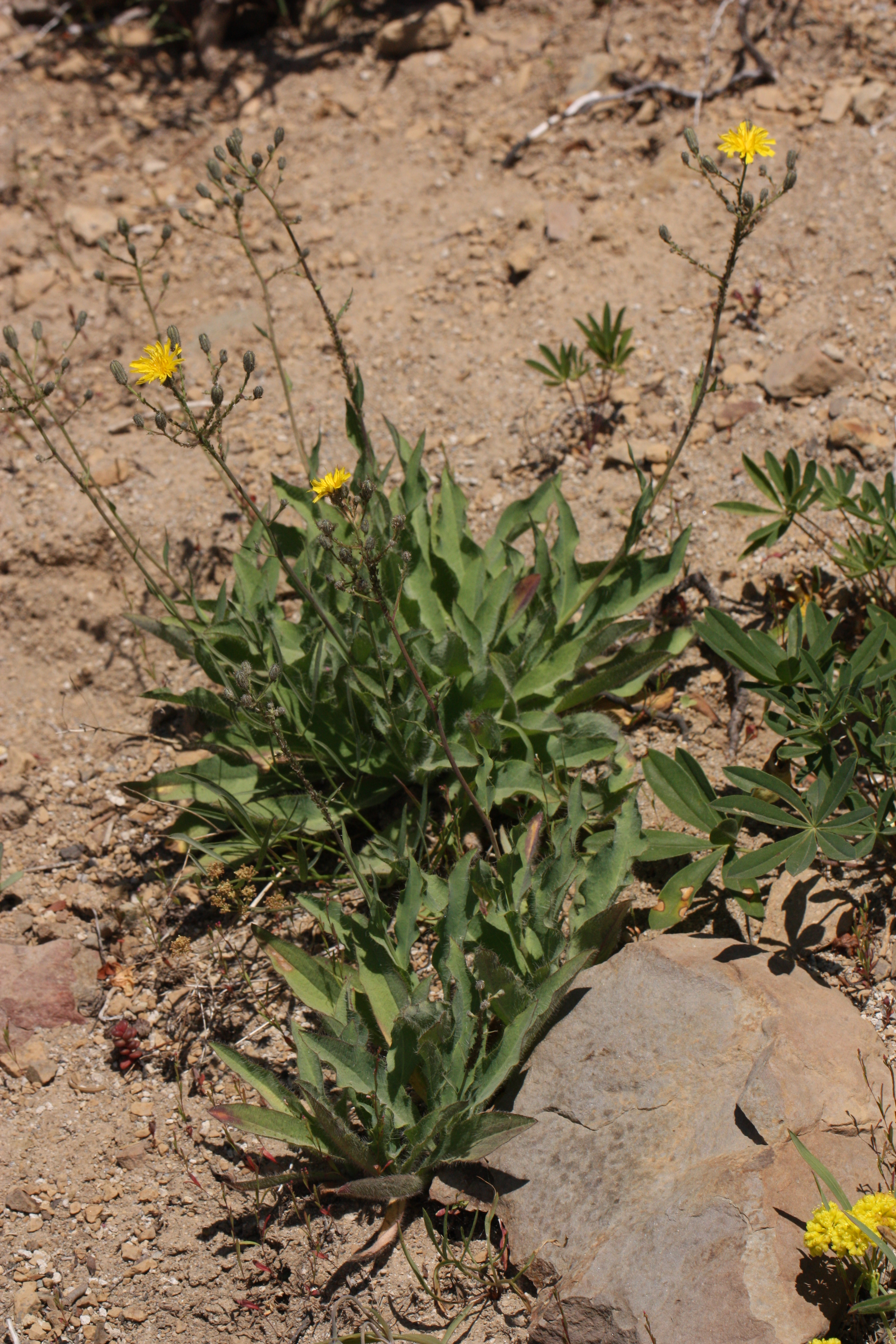
- At the Dark Divide, Washington

Scientific classification
- Kingdom: Plantae
- Clade: Tracheophytes
- Clade: Angiosperms
- Clade: Eudicots
- Clade: Asterids
- Order: Asterales
- Family: Asteraceae
- Genus: Hieracium
- Species: H. scouleri

Binomial name
- Hieracium scouleri Hook.

Synonyms
- List: Pilosella scouleri (Hook.) F.W.Schultz & Sch.Bip.; Hieracium absonum J.F.Macbr. & Payson; Hieracium albertinum Farr; Hieracium chapacanum Zahn; Hieracium cusikii Gand.; Hieracium cynoglossoides Arv.-Touv.; Hieracium flettii H.St.John; Hieracium praealtum var. decipiens W.D.J.Koch; Hieracium scouleri Hook. ex A.Gray

= Hieracium scouleri =

Species of flowering plant

Hieracium scouleri, known as Scouler's woollyweed, is a species of flowering plant in the tribe Cichorieae within the family Asteraceae. It is native to western North America, from British Columbia and Alberta in Canada, and south to northern California and Utah in the United States.

== Description ==
Hieracium scouleri grows in a variety of mountainous habitats. It produces a basal rosette of long, narrow leaves 10–20 centimetres (3.9–7.9 in) long, which are generally hairy to bristly. The plant produces an erect stem 30–70 centimetres (12–28 in) tall which bears the inflorescence. Each flower head has large, curling bracts with glandular hairs or bristles, long, bright yellow ray florets but no disc florets. The achene is about 3 millimetres (0.12 in) long.

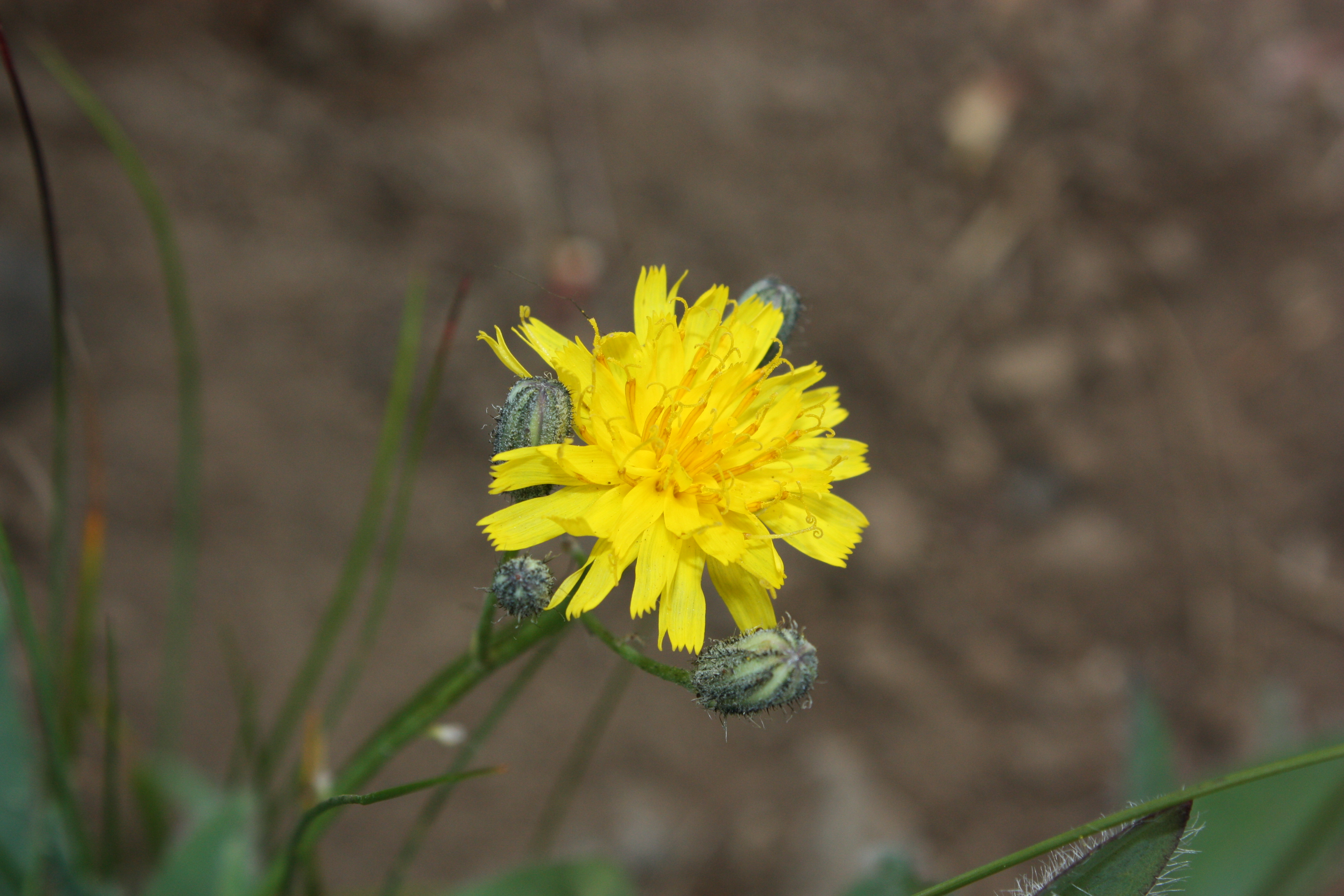
Flower heads have many bright yellow ray florets
