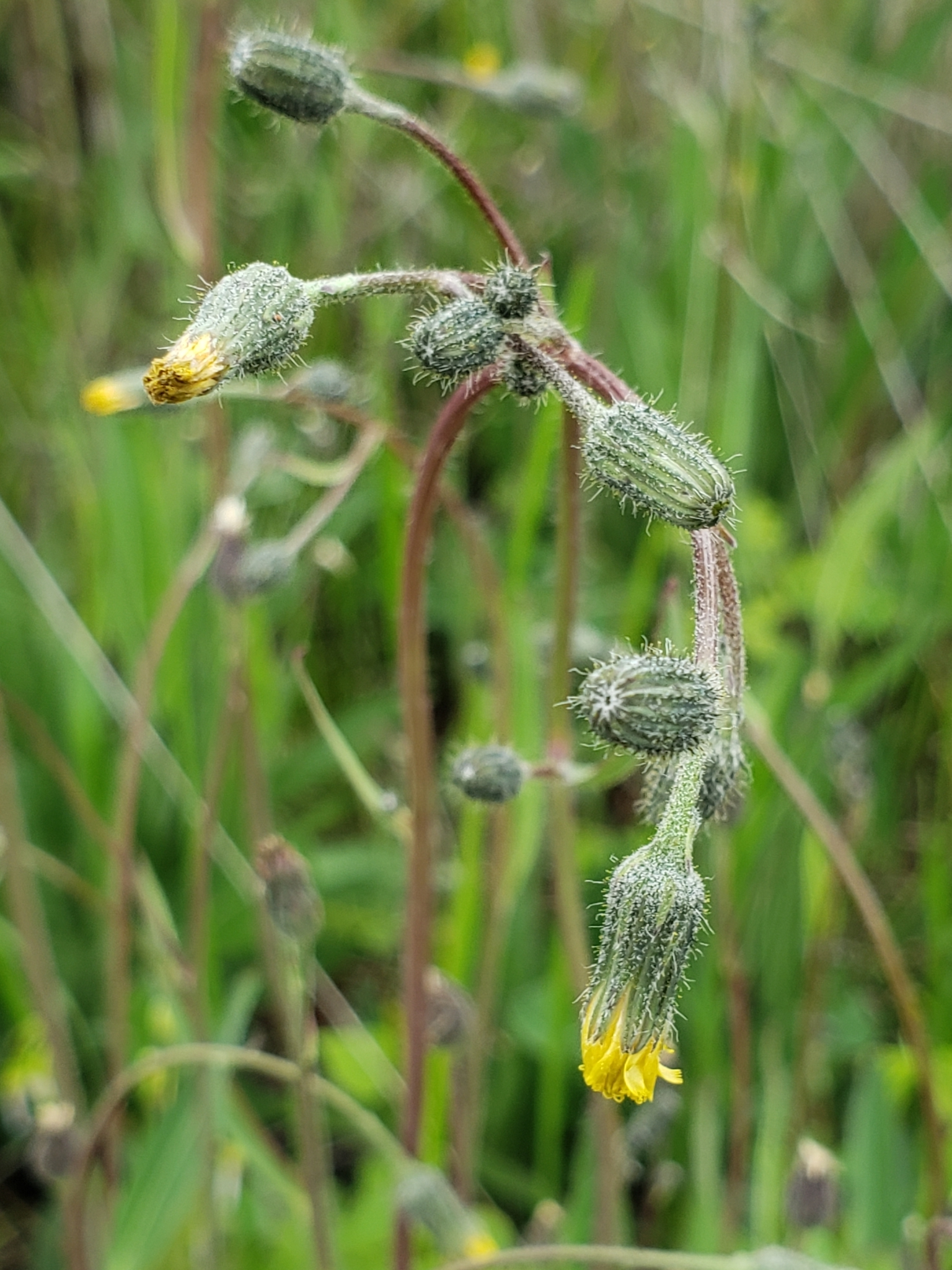

Scientific classification
- Kingdom: Plantae
- Clade: Embryophytes
- Clade: Tracheophytes
- Clade: Angiosperms
- Clade: Eudicots
- Clade: Asterids
- Order: Asterales
- Family: Asteraceae
- Genus: Hieracium
- Species: H. schultzii

Binomial name
- Hieracium schultzii Fr.

Synonyms
- List: Hieracium bulbisetum Arv.-Touv.; Hieracium friesii Sch.Bip.; Hieracium jaliscopolum S.F.Blake; Hieracium liebmannii Zahn; Hieracium melanochryseum S.F.Blake; Hieracium nicolasii S.F.Blake; Hieracium oaxacanum B.L.Rob. & Greenm.; Hieracium rusbyi var. wrightii A.Gray; Hieracium wrightii (A.Gray) B.L.Rob. & Greenm.; Pilosella friesii F.W.Schultz & Sch.Bip.

= Hieracium schultzii =

Species of plant in the daisy family

Hieracium schultzii, the roughstem hawkweed, is a species of plant in the tribe Cichorieae within the family Asteraceae. It is widespread across much of Mexico with a few populations in Guatemala and western Texas.

Hieracium schultzii is herbaceous and up to 70 cm (2.3 ft) tall with many hairs. Leaves are both on the stem and at the bottom. Leaves are up to 150 mm (5.9 in) long. One stalk can produce 3–25 flower heads in a conical or flat-topped array. Each head has 25–40 yellow ray flowers but no disc flowers.
