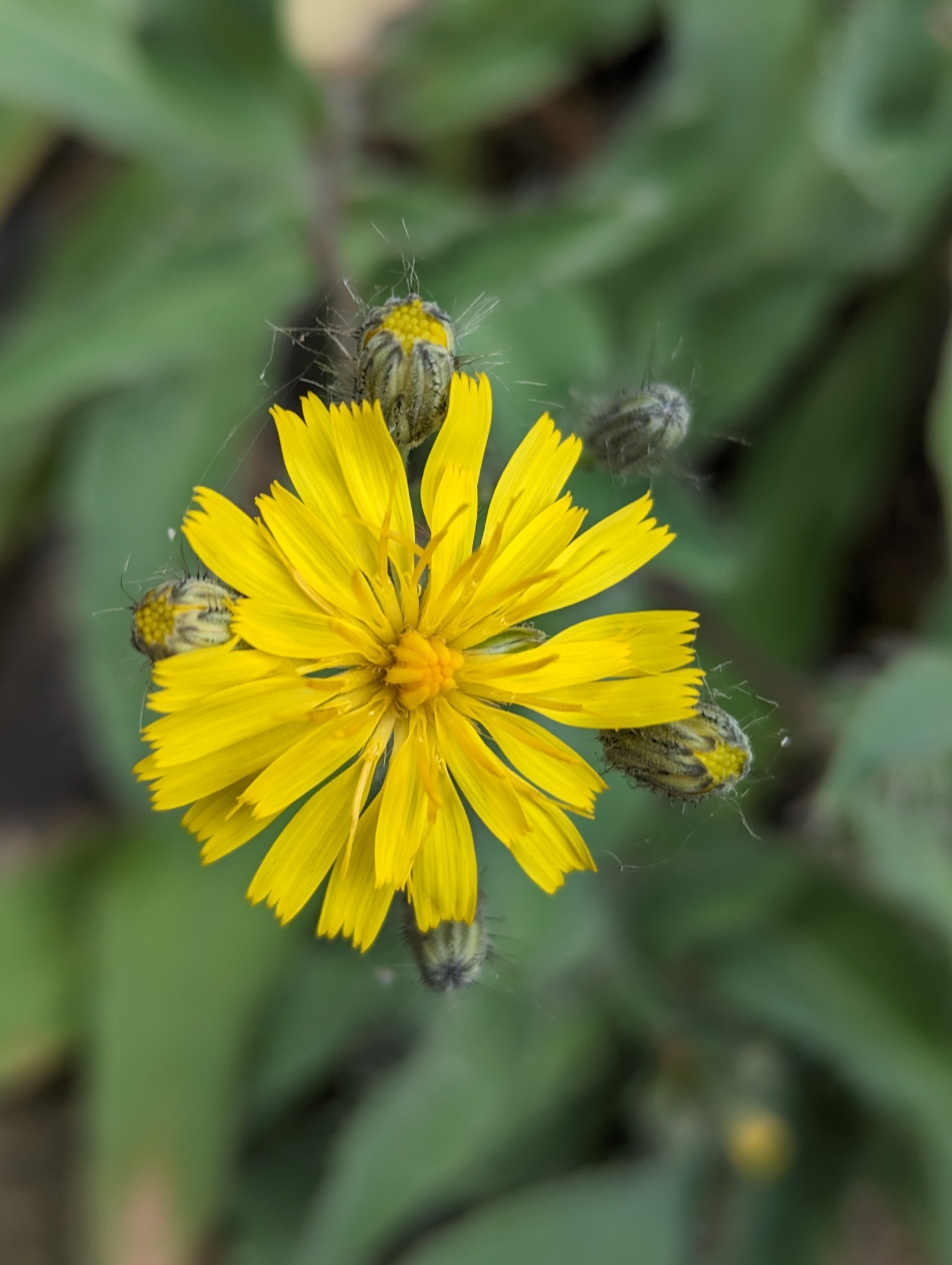

Scientific classification
- Kingdom: Plantae
- Clade: Tracheophytes
- Clade: Angiosperms
- Clade: Eudicots
- Clade: Asterids
- Order: Asterales
- Family: Asteraceae
- Genus: Hieracium
- Species: H. longiberbe

Binomial name
- Hieracium longiberbe Howell 1901

= Hieracium longiberbe =

Species of flowering plant

Hieracium longiberbe, known by the common name longbeard hawkweed, is a rare North American plant species in the tribe Cichorieae within the family Asteraceae It has been found only in the Columbia River Gorge along the border between the states of Washington and Oregon in the northwestern United States.

Hieracium longiberbe is an herb up to 50 cm (20 in) tall, with leaves mostly on the stem rather than in a rosette at the bottom. Leaves, stems, and the bracts surrounding the flower heads are covered with long and conspicuous hairs up to 8 mm (0.31 in) long. Leaves are up to 100 mm (3.9 in) long, with no teeth on the edges. One stalk will produce 3-12 flower heads in a flat-topped array. Each head has 12-24 yellow ray flowers but no disc flowers.
