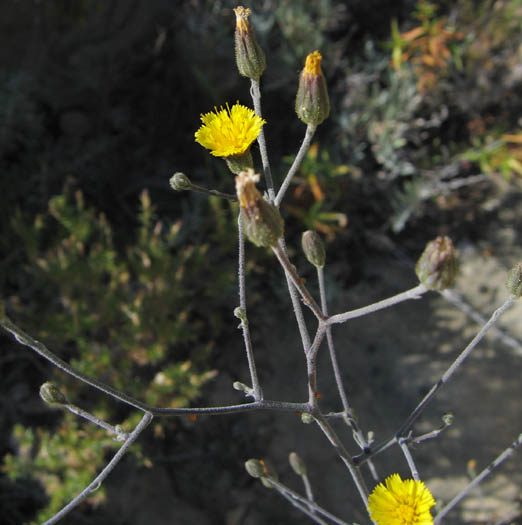

Conservation status
- Imperiled (NatureServe)

Scientific classification
- Kingdom: Plantae
- Clade: Tracheophytes
- Clade: Angiosperms
- Clade: Eudicots
- Clade: Asterids
- Order: Asterales
- Family: Asteraceae
- Genus: Hieracium
- Species: H. argutum

Binomial name
- Hieracium argutum Nutt.

= Hieracium argutum =

Species of flowering plant

Hieracium argutum is a species of flowering plant in the family Asteraceae known by the common name southern hawkweed.

It is endemic to California, where it can be found in coastal and inland hills and mountains, often in oak woodland and pine forest habitat.

== Description ==
Hieracium argutum is a perennial herb producing a mostly erect stem which is very hairy on the lower part and becomes nearly hairless toward the tip. The plant grows 60 centimeters to one meter tall.

The deeply toothed leaves are covered in long hairs. The largest leaves at the base of the stem may reach 16 centimeters. There may be shorter leaves on the lower part of the stem and there are few or none on the upper part.

The inflorescence is a wide open array of many flower heads, each up to about a centimeter wide. The flower head is lined with hairy, often glandular phyllaries and filled with many yellow ray florets and no disc florets.

The fruit is a small, dark cylindrical achene topped with a pappus of brown bristles.
