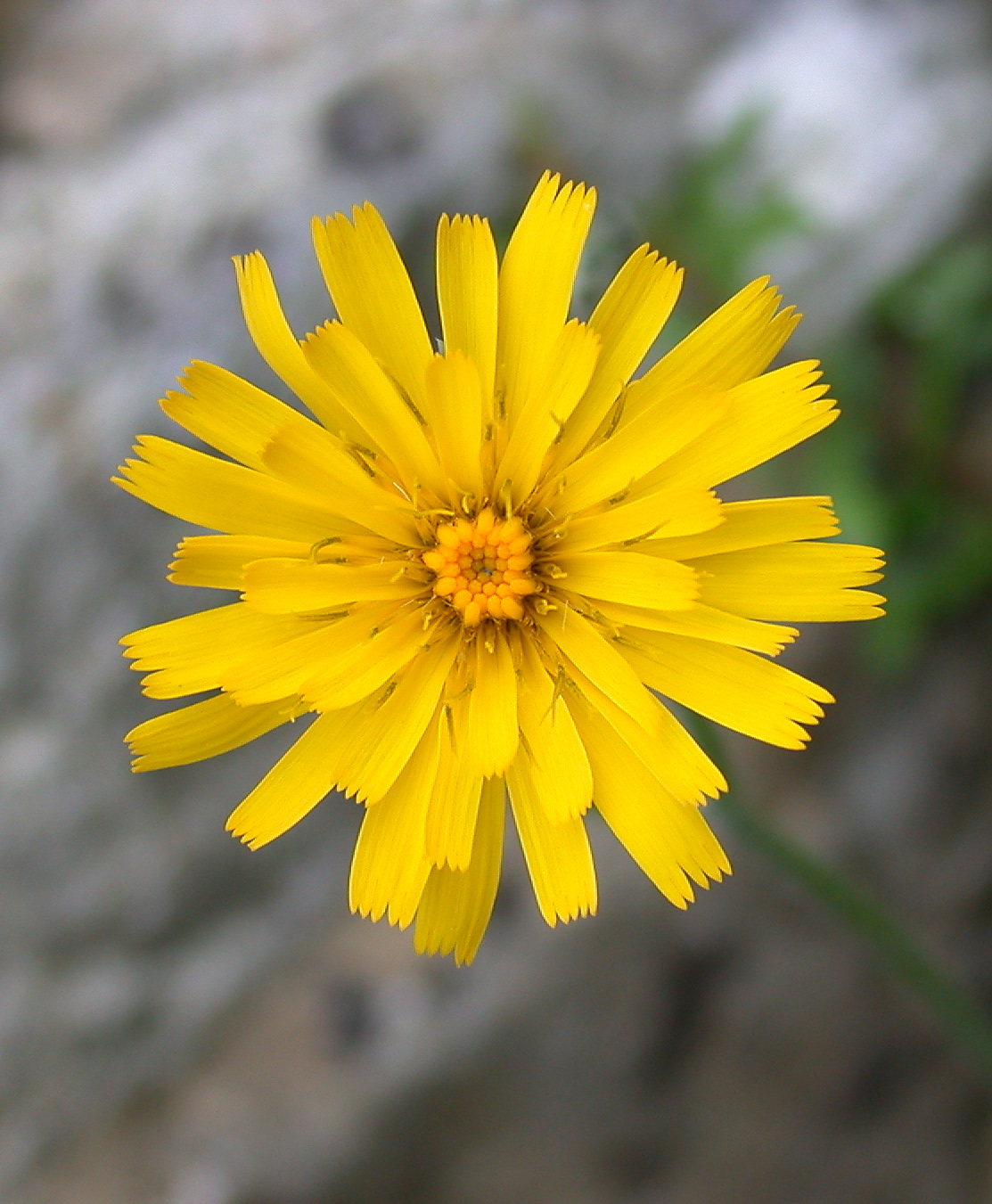
- Close-up of flower
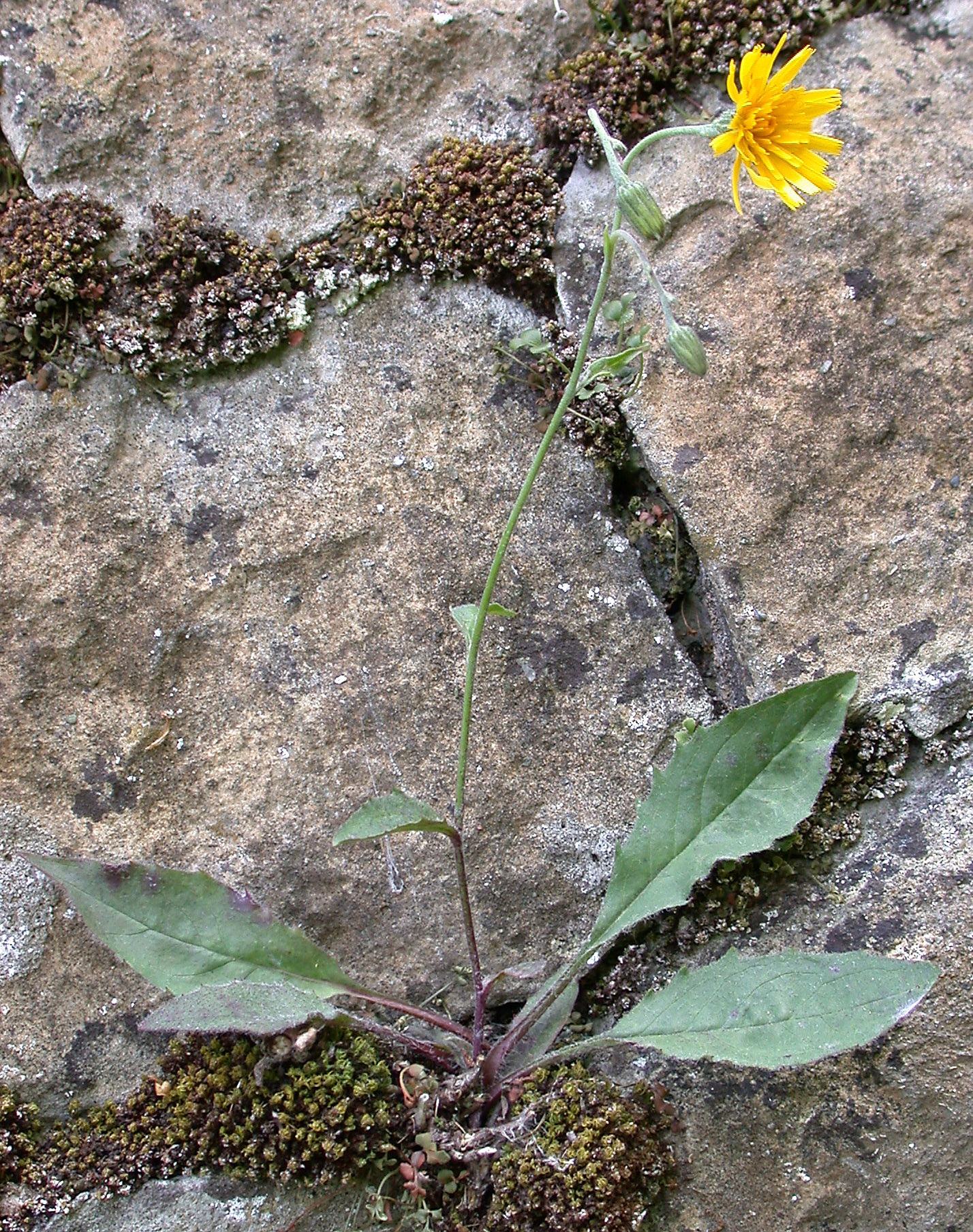
- Habit

Scientific classification
- Kingdom: Plantae
- Clade: Tracheophytes
- Clade: Angiosperms
- Clade: Eudicots
- Clade: Asterids
- Order: Asterales
- Family: Asteraceae
- Genus: Hieracium
- Species: H. lepidulum

Binomial name
- Hieracium lepidulum Stenstr. ex Dahlst.

Synonyms
- Hieracium lepiduliforme Dahlst.; Hieracium levicaule subsp. lepidulum (Stenstr. ex Dahlst.) Greuter; Hieracium nudiceps Čelak.

= Hieracium lepidulum =

Species of plant

Hieracium lepidulum, the tussock hawkweed, is a species of flowering plant in the family Asteraceae, native to Europe, and introduced to Great Britain. A triploid, it is considered potentially invasive in New Zealand.
