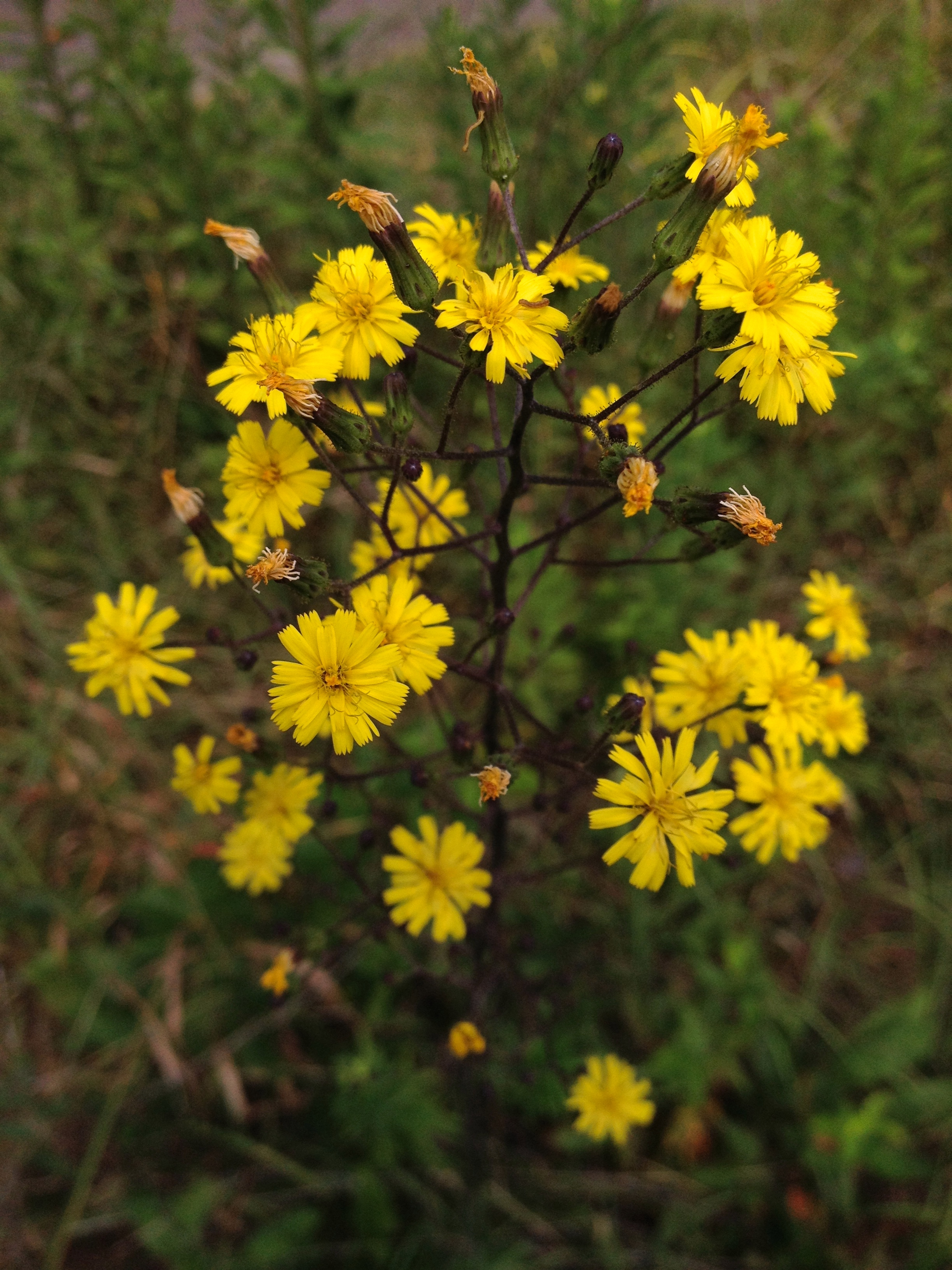

Conservation status
- Secure (NatureServe)

Scientific classification
- Kingdom: Plantae
- Clade: Embryophytes
- Clade: Tracheophytes
- Clade: Spermatophytes
- Clade: Angiosperms
- Clade: Eudicots
- Clade: Asterids
- Order: Asterales
- Family: Asteraceae
- Genus: Hieracium
- Species: H. gronovii

Binomial name
- Hieracium gronovii L. 1753

Synonyms
- Hieracium hondurense S.F.Blake; Hieracium minarum Standl. & Steyerm.; Hieracium panamense S.F.Blake; Stenotheca gronovii (L.) Sennikov; Hieracium domingense Zahn

= Hieracium gronovii =

Species of flowering plant

Hieracium gronovii, commonly known as queendevil, hairy hawkweed, beaked hawkweed, and Gronovius' hawkweed, is a North American plant species in the tribe Cichorieae within the family Asteraceae. It is common and widespread across much of the continent from Ontario south as far as Florida, the Dominican Republic, and Panama. The plant can be found in rocky, dry, open woods and in fields.

Hieracium gronovii is an herb up to 80 cm (31 in) tall, with a hairy stem rising from a rosette of basal leaves. The basal leaves are up to 20 cm (8 in) long and are broadly obovate in shape. Leaves on the stem are alternate and smaller. The base of the stem is hairier than the upper stem. The upper stem also has fewer, smaller leaves. The flowers, blooming May to October, are yellow and small, up to 8 mm (0.3 in) across.

== Ecology ==
Hieracium gronovii is insect pollinated and is recorded to have been visited in northern Florida by Lasioglossum reticulatum.
