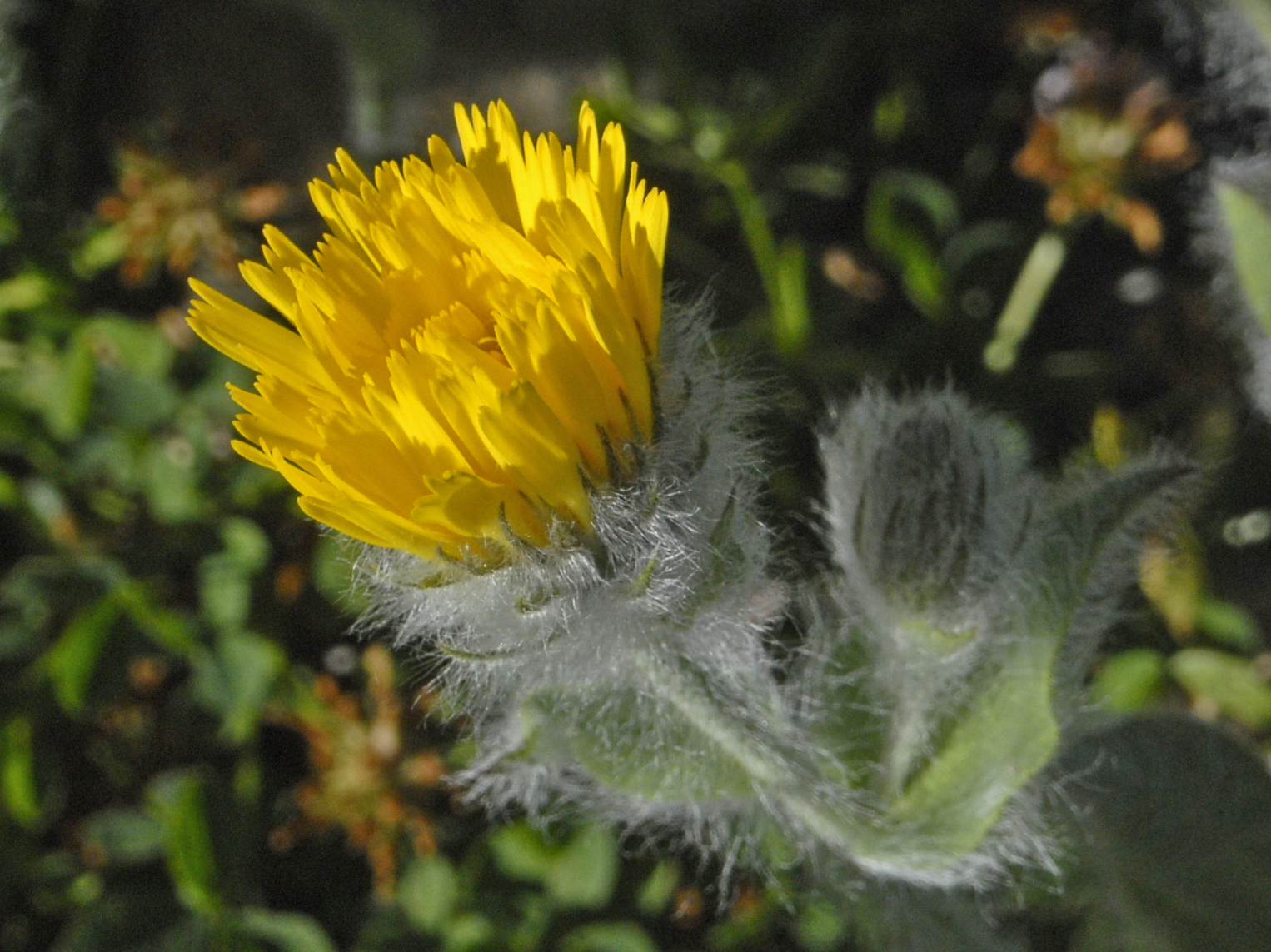
- Flower of Hieracium villosum at the Giardino Botanico Alpino Chanousia
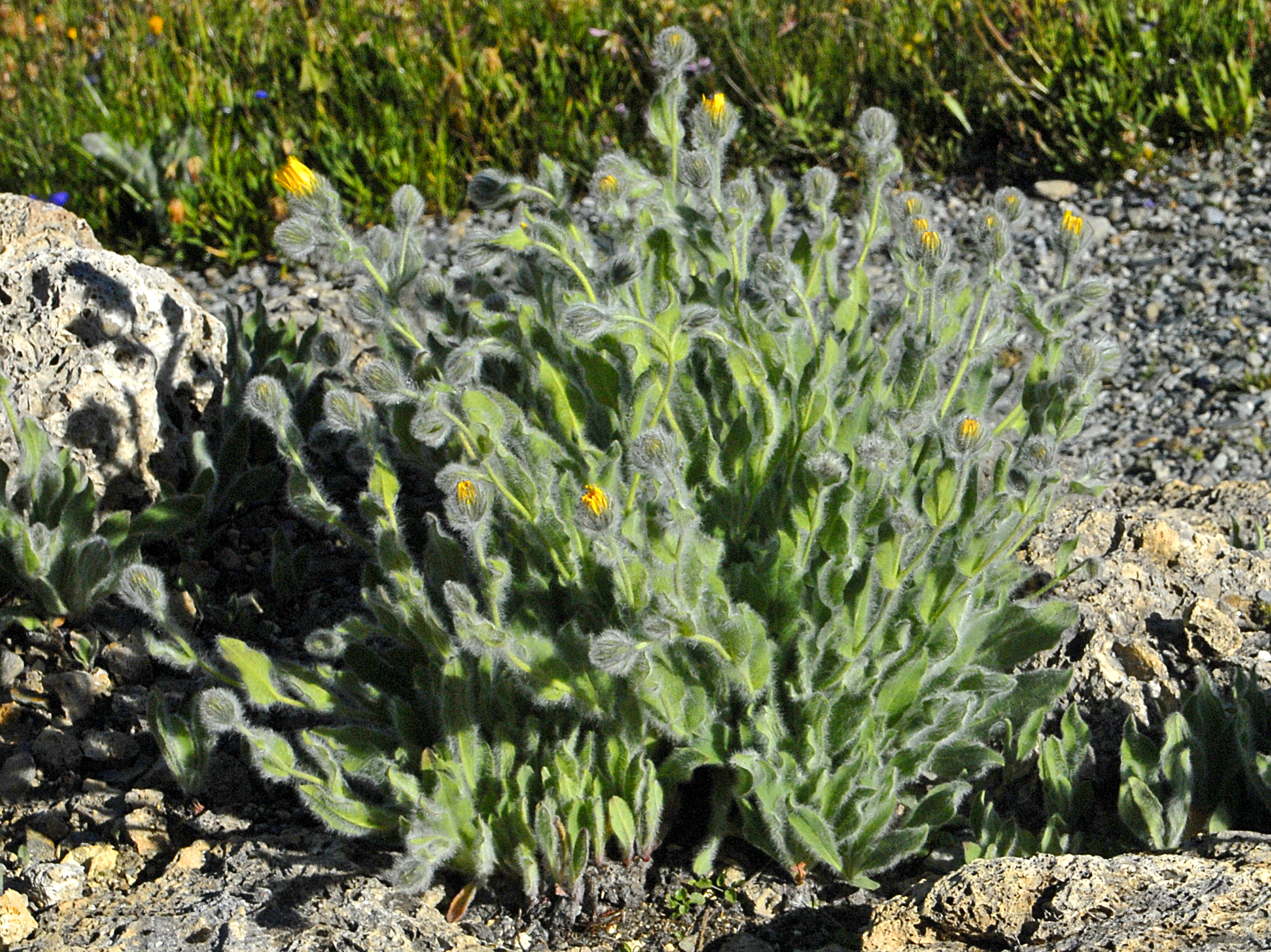
- Plants of Hieracium villosum at the Giardino Botanico Alpino Chanousia

Scientific classification
- Kingdom: Plantae
- Clade: Embryophytes
- Clade: Tracheophytes
- Clade: Spermatophytes
- Clade: Angiosperms
- Clade: Eudicots
- Clade: Asterids
- Order: Asterales
- Family: Asteraceae
- Genus: Hieracium
- Species: H. villosum

Binomial name
- Hieracium villosum Jacq.

= Hieracium villosum =

Species of flowering plant

Hieracium villosum, the shaggy hawkweed, is a species of flowering plant in the family Asteraceae.

== Description ==
Hieracium villosum can reach a height of 30–45 centimetres (12–18 in). This plant forms dense basal rosettes of silver-grey, simple, oblong to lanceolate, woolly leaves, about 4.5–8.5 centimetres (1.8–3.3 in) long. The many-stellate flowers are bright yellow, 4–5 centimetres (1.6–2.0 in) large, on white-hairy stems. They bloom from July to August.

== Distribution ==
This species is native to France, Italy, Central Europe, the Balkan Peninsula, Romania and Russia.

== Habitat ==
Hieracium villosum can be found in mountain areas in calcareous stony and grassy places, at elevation of 1,400–2,500 metres (4,600–8,200 ft) above sea level.
