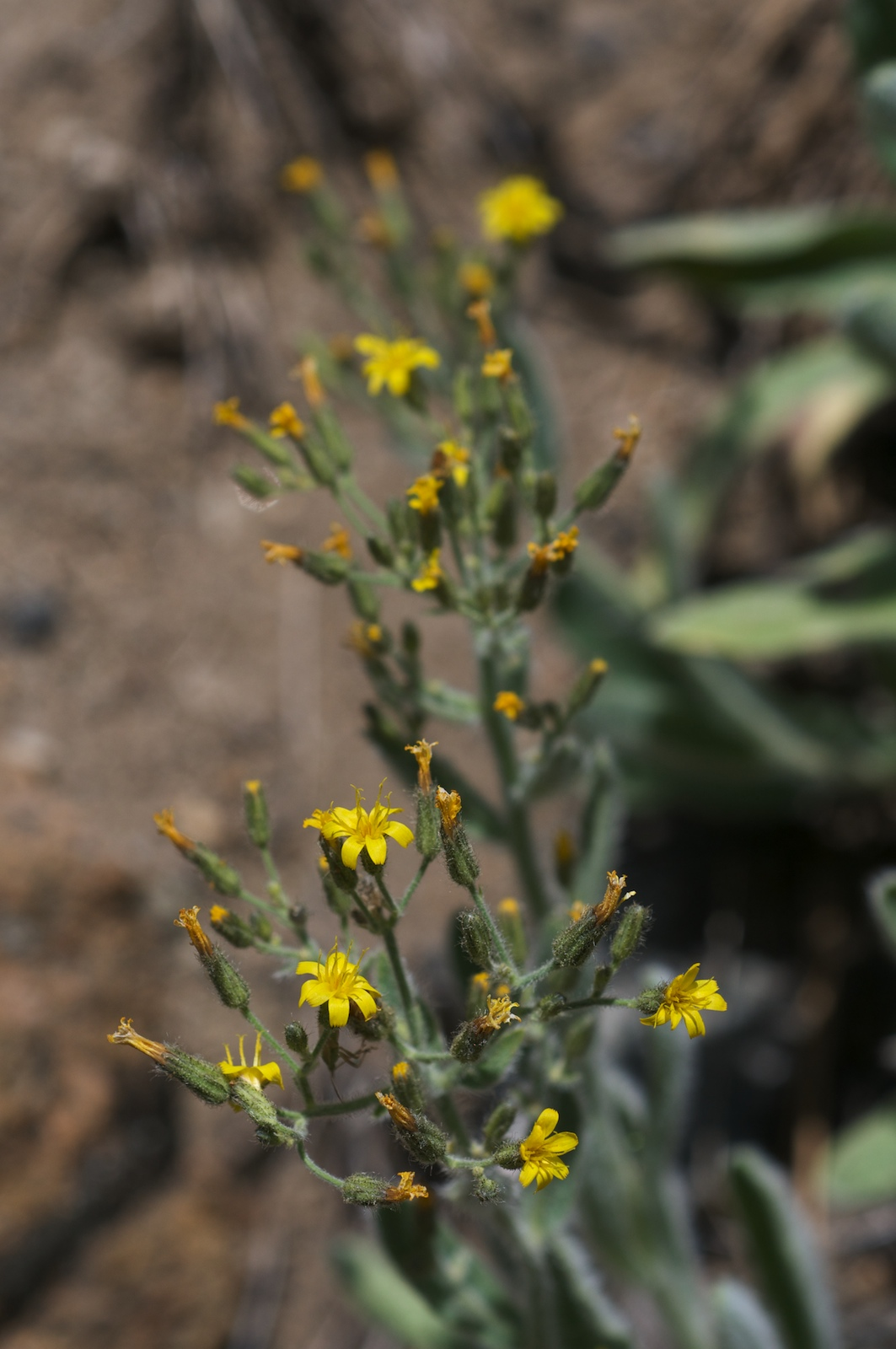

Scientific classification
- Kingdom: Plantae
- Clade: Embryophytes
- Clade: Tracheophytes
- Clade: Angiosperms
- Clade: Eudicots
- Clade: Asterids
- Order: Asterales
- Family: Asteraceae
- Genus: Hieracium
- Species: H. horridum

Binomial name
- Hieracium horridum Fr.

Synonyms
- Hieracium breweri A.Gray; Pilosella horrida (Fr.) F.W.Schultz & Sch.Bip.

= Hieracium horridum =

Species of flowering plant

Hieracium horridum, known as the prickly hawkweed or shaggy hawkweed, is a species of plant in the family Asteraceae. It gets its name from the long, dense, shaggy white to brown hairs (trichomes) which cover all of the plant parts of this plant species. The species is native to Oregon, California, and Nevada in the western United States.

== Name ==
The epithet horridum means 'bristly' in reference to its hairy leaves.

== Description ==
Hieracium horridum possesses oblong leaves along the stems of this 4 inches (10 cm) to 15 inches (38 cm) tall hairy plant with 11-12 bright yellow flower heads at the top of each flower head, which is 0.315 inches (8 mm) to 0.354 inches (9 mm) in diameter. It flowers between late June and August.

Like all members of the family Asteraceae, the flowers are actually florets made up of many ray corolla, each ray its own stamen. As with other plants of the tribe Cichorieae, the stems and leaves produce a milky substance when broken.

== Distribution ==
The habitat of Hieracium horridum is in dry rocky places within mountainous coniferous forests in Oregon, California and Nevada at elevations between 5,000 feet (1,524 m) and 12,000 feet (3,658 m).
