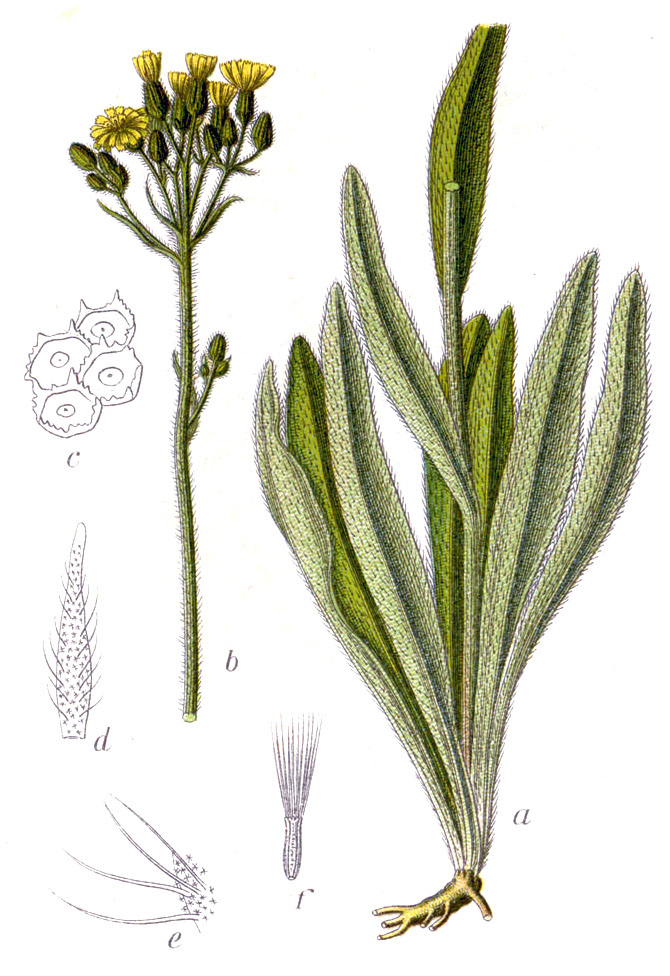
- 1796 illustration;

Scientific classification
- Kingdom: Plantae
- Clade: Tracheophytes
- Clade: Angiosperms
- Clade: Eudicots
- Clade: Asterids
- Order: Asterales
- Family: Asteraceae
- Genus: Hieracium
- Species: H. piloselloides

Binomial name
- Hieracium piloselloides Vill. 1799

= Hieracium piloselloides =

Species of flowering plant

Hieracium piloselloides is a species of flowering plant in the family Asteraceae known by the common name tall hawkweed. It is native to Europe and it is present in North America as an introduced species and a common weed.

This is a perennial herb producing erect stems which may exceed one meter in height from a rhizome and root network. The leaves are variable in size and shape. The inflorescence is made up of flower heads containing yellow flowers.

In the eastern Canadian provinces and eastern United States this plant can be found in many types of habitat, including disturbed fields, abandoned pastures, human-constructed marshes and riverbanks, lakeshores, dunes, beaches, grasslands, shrublands, savannas, alvar, and many types of forest. In Victoria and NSW, Australia, Hawkweed Sp. are declared as State Prohibited Weeds and are controlled under The Bio Security Act 2015. Currently there are several eradication programs operating (often employing volunteers) to locate, prevent the spread of and eradicate any Pilosella (Hieracium) sp. plants.
