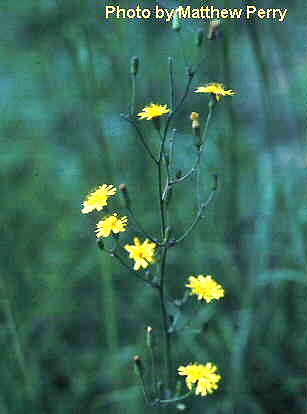

Scientific classification
- Kingdom: Plantae
- Clade: Tracheophytes
- Clade: Angiosperms
- Clade: Eudicots
- Clade: Asterids
- Order: Asterales
- Family: Asteraceae
- Genus: Hieracium
- Species: H. paniculatum

Binomial name
- Hieracium paniculatum L. 1753 not Jacq. 1796 nor Gilib. 1792 nor Hort.Hafn. ex Froel. 1838 nor Gueldenst. 1787

= Hieracium paniculatum =

Species of flowering plant

Hieracium paniculatum, the Allegheny hawkweed, is a North American plant species in the tribe Cichorieae within the family Asteraceae. It grows only in the eastern United States and eastern Canada, from Nova Scotia west to Ontario, Michigan, and Indiana south as far as Georgia.

Hieracium paniculatum is an herb up to 90 cm (3.0 ft) tall, with leaves mostly on the stem with only a few in a rosette at the bottom. Leaves are up to 150 mm (5.9 in) long, sometimes with teeth on the edges. One stalk can sometimes produce as many as 50 flower heads in a flat-topped array. Each head has 8-30 yellow ray flowers but no disc flowers.
