= Hieracium pringlei =

Scientific classification
- Kingdom: Plantae
- Clade: Tracheophytes
- Clade: Angiosperms
- Clade: Eudicots
- Clade: Asterids
- Order: Asterales
- Family: Asteraceae
- Genus: Hieracium
- Species: H. pringlei

Binomial name
- Hieracium pringlei A.Gray 1883

Synonyms
- Hieracium jaliscense var. eriobium Zahn; Hieracium jaliscense var. ghiesbreghtii B.L.Rob. & Greenm.; Hieracium jaliscense var. guatemalense Sleumer; Stenotheca pringlei (A.Gray) Sennikov

Species of flowering plant

Hieracium pringlei, common name Pringle's hawkweed, is a North American plant species in the tribe Cichorieae within the family Asteraceae. It is native to Mexico with additional populations in Guatemala, Arizona, and New Mexico.

Hieracium pringlei is an herb up to 45 cm (18 in) tall with woolly hairs, with leaves both on the stem and in a rosette at the bottom. Leaves are up to 200 mm (7.9 in) long, hairy, occasionally with teeth on the edges. One stalk can produce 3-20 flower heads in a flat-topped array. Each head has 12-15 yellow ray flowers but no disc flowers.
