= Hieracium robinsonii =

Scientific classification
- Kingdom: Plantae
- Clade: Tracheophytes
- Clade: Angiosperms
- Clade: Eudicots
- Clade: Asterids
- Order: Asterales
- Family: Asteraceae
- Genus: Hieracium
- Species: H. robinsonii

Binomial name
- Hieracium robinsonii (Zahl) Fernald 1943

Synonyms
- Hieracium smolandicum subsp. robinsonii Zahl 1921; Hieracium ungavense Lepage

Species of flowering plant

Hieracium robinsonii, or Robinson's hawkweed, is a North American plant species in the tribe Cichorieae within the family Asteraceae. It is native to eastern Canada and the northeastern United States (Québec, New Brunswick, Nova Scotia, Maine, and New Hampshire). There are reports of it formerly growing in Newfoundland, but it does not appear to grow there now.

Hieracium robinsonii is an herb up to 35 cm (14 in) tall with star-shaped hairs, with leaves both on the stem and in a rosette at the bottom. Leaves are up to 80 mm (3.1 in) long, with no or only a few hairs on the upper surface and more dense hairs on the underside. One stalk can produce 1–10 flower heads in a flat-topped array. Each head has 30–50 yellow ray flowers but no disc flowers.
