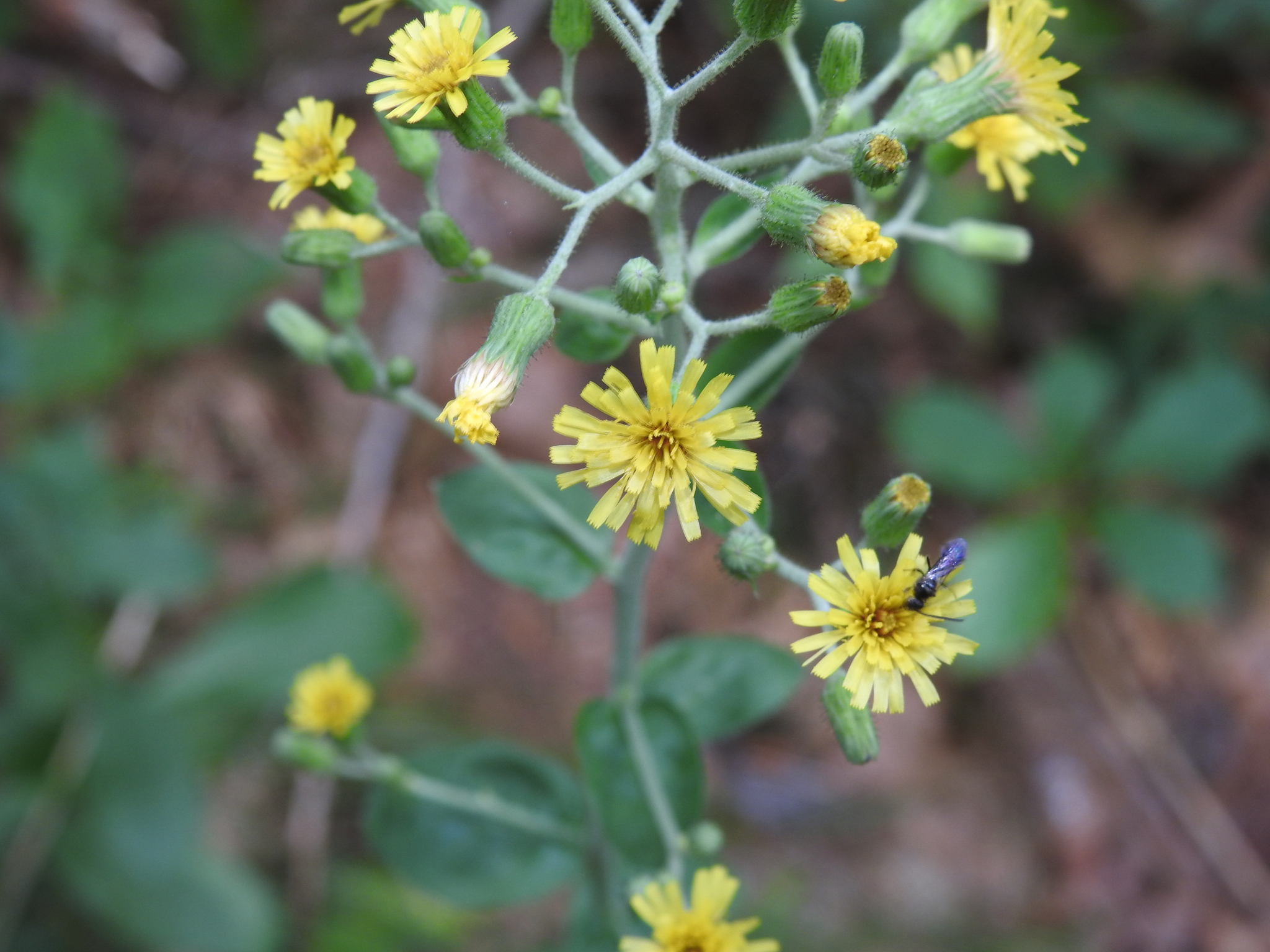

Conservation status
- Secure (NatureServe)

Scientific classification
- Kingdom: Plantae
- Clade: Tracheophytes
- Clade: Angiosperms
- Clade: Eudicots
- Clade: Asterids
- Order: Asterales
- Family: Asteraceae
- Genus: Hieracium
- Species: H. scabrum

Binomial name
- Hieracium scabrum Michx. 1803 not Willd. ex Froel. 1838 nor Gaud. 1820

= Hieracium scabrum =

Species of flowering plant

Hieracium scabrum, commonly known as rough hawkweed or sticky hawkweed, is a North American plant species in the tribe Cichorieae within the family Asteraceae. It is native to the eastern and central United States and Canada.

== Description ==
Hieracium scabrum is an herb up to 60 cm (2.0 ft) tall with many hairs so that it feels rough to the touch. Leaves are mostly on the stem with only a few at the bottom. Leaves are up to 120 mm (4.7 in) long. One stalk can produce 5-50 flower heads in a conical or flat-topped array. Each head has 30-60 yellow ray flowers but no disc flowers. Flowers bloom from July to September.

== Distribution and habitat ==
Hieracium scabrum is native to the eastern and central United States and Canada from Nova Scotia west to Ontario, Minnesota, and Kansas south as far as Georgia and Oklahoma. It grows in sandy soils and inhabits in a variety of habitats including anthropogenic habitats, meadows, fields and woodlands.

== Ecology ==
Little is known about floral-faunal relationships involving Hieracium scabrum, but the flower heads are likely pollinated by long-tongued bees and other insects. It is suspected that Hieracium scabrum serves as a host plant for Schinia bina. The seeds and leaves of Hieracium scabrum are known to be eaten by wild turkey and ruffed grouse. The foliage is occasionally browsed by eastern cottontails and white-tailed deer, but is not a preferred food source due to its hairiness and it containing an unpalatable bitter white latex.

== Ethnobotany ==
Hieracium scabrum was used by the Rappahannock as an antidiarrheal drug.
