= Hieracium parryi =

Scientific classification
- Kingdom: Plantae
- Clade: Tracheophytes
- Clade: Angiosperms
- Clade: Eudicots
- Clade: Asterids
- Order: Asterales
- Family: Asteraceae
- Genus: Hieracium
- Species: H. parryi

Binomial name
- Hieracium parryi Zahn 1922

Species of flowering plant

Hieracium parryi is a North American plant species in the tribe Cichorieae within the family Asteraceae. It grows only in the western United States, in southwestern Oregon and northeastern California. It is commonly known as woollyweed.

Hieracium parryi is an herb up to 45 cm (18 in) tall, with leaves mostly on the stem with only a few in a rosette at the bottom. Leaves are up to 150 mm (5.9 in) long, hairy, sometimes with teeth on the edges. One stalk can produce 1–12 flower heads in a flat-topped array. Each head has 30–60 yellow ray flowers but no disc flowers. Its habitats include grassy slopes and brush openings.
