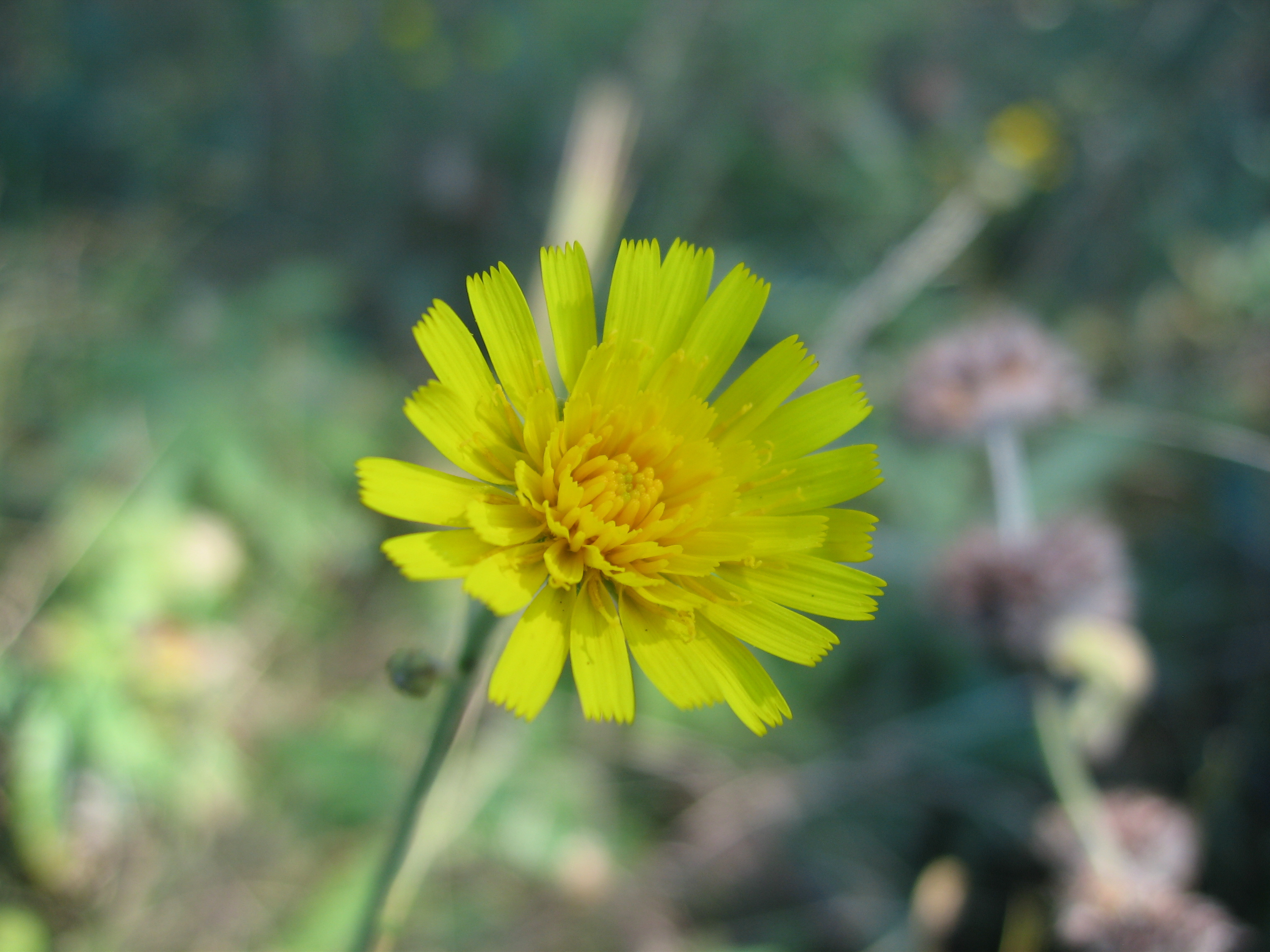

Scientific classification
- Kingdom: Plantae
- Clade: Tracheophytes
- Clade: Angiosperms
- Clade: Eudicots
- Clade: Asterids
- Order: Asterales
- Family: Asteraceae
- Genus: Hieracium
- Species: H. sabaudum

Binomial name
- Hieracium sabaudum L.

Synonyms
- Synonymy: Hieracium autumnale Griseb.; Hieracium bladonii Pugsley; Hieracium melanocalathium Borbás; Hieracium platyphyllum (Arv.-Touv.) Arv.-Touv.; Hieracium silvestre Tausch; Hieracium valdefoliosum Sudre

= Hieracium sabaudum =

Species of flowering plant

Hieracium sabaudum, also known as New England hawkweed, European hawkweed or a Savoy hawkweed, is a European species of plants in the tribe Cichorieae within the family Asteraceae. It is native to Europe but has become naturalized in parts of North America. In Canada, it grows in British Columbia, Québec, and Nova Scotia. In the United States, it has been found in Washington state in the Northwest as well as Wisconsin and the Northeast (from Maine to Ohio). The species is considered a noxious weed in Washington state.

== Habitat and distribution ==
The plant can be found growing in the fields, roadsides and forests, and usually in well-drained soil.

== Common names ==
English: New England hawkweed, European king devil

French: épervíère de Savoie
