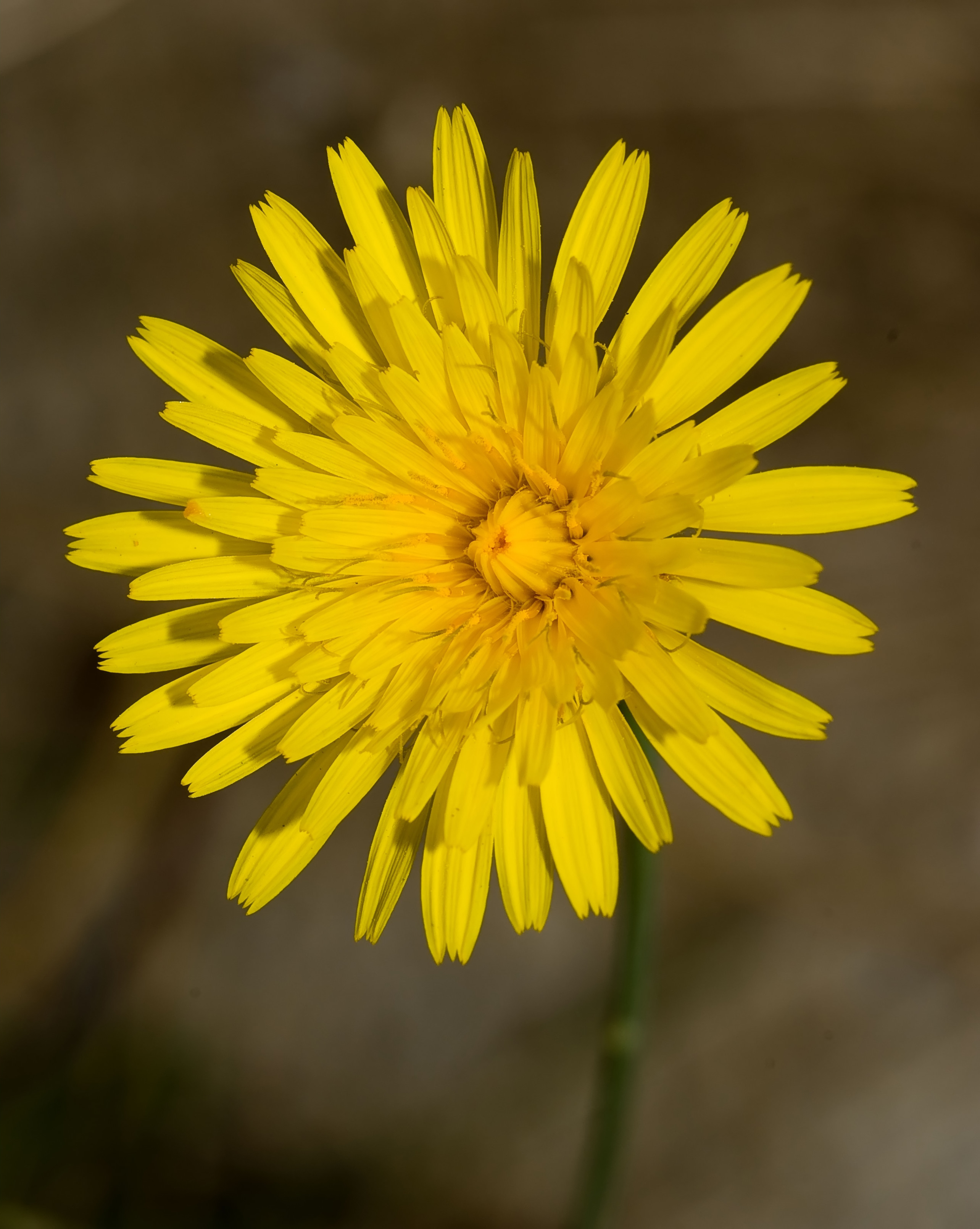

Scientific classification
- Kingdom: Plantae
- Clade: Embryophytes
- Clade: Tracheophytes
- Clade: Angiosperms
- Clade: Eudicots
- Clade: Asterids
- Order: Asterales
- Family: Asteraceae
- Genus: Hieracium
- Species: H. lachenalii

Binomial name
- Hieracium lachenalii Suter 1802 not C.C.Gmel. 1808
- Hieracium lachenalii distribution

Synonyms
- Synonymy: ieracium acuminatum Jord.; Hieracium anfractum (Fr.) Fr.; Hieracium argillaceoides (Litv. & Zahn) Üksip; Hieracium argillaceum Jord.; Hieracium asyngamicum Borbás; Hieracium aurulentum Boreau; Hieracium aviicola Boreau; Hieracium strumosum (W.R.Linton) Ley; Hieracium cebennense Arv.-Touv.; Hieracium chenopodioides Arv.-Touv.; Hieracium cheriense Jord. ex Boreau; Hieracium chlorophyllum Jord. ex Boreau; Hieracium cladophorum (Vuk.) B.D.Jacks.; Hieracium consociatum Jord. ex Boreau; Hieracium amitsokense (Almq.) Dahlst. ex Omang; Hieracium cruentifolium Dahlst. & lubeck. ex Dahlst. & Lübeck; Hieracium groenlandicum Arv.-Touv.; Hieracium ivigtutense (Almq.) Omang; Hieracium scholanderi Omang; Hieracium sylowi Omang; Hieracium vulgatiforme Dahlst.; Hieracium vulgatum Fr.; Hieracium dalicum Johanss.; Hieracium borodinianum Üksip; Hieracium deductum Sudre; Hieracium jaccardii Zahn; Hieracium latebrosum Boreau; Hieracium medioximum Boreau; Hieracium epichlorum (Litv. & Zahn) Üksip; Hieracium erythropodum R.Uechtr.; Hieracium euchlorum (Murr & Zahn) Prain; Hieracium fastigiatum Fr.; Hieracium festinum Jord. ex Boreau; Hieracium umbraticola Boreau; Hieracium frondosiforme (Zahn) Prain; Hieracium punctillaticeps Johanss.; Hieracium garckeanum Asch.; Hieracium hypopitys (Litv. & Zahn) Üksip; Hieracium irriguiceps (Zahn) Schljakov; Hieracium euirriguum (Zahn) Schljakov; Hieracium irriguum (Fr.) Dahlst.; Hieracium juratzkanum (Zahn) Schljakov; Hieracium lepidiceps (Dahlst.) Prain; Hieracium lortetiae Balb.; Hieracium macrophyllopodum (Zahn) Üksip; Hieracium mertinii C.C.Gmel.; Hieracium nemophilum Boreau; Hieracium querceticola Jord. ex Boreau; Hieracium obscuriceps (Dahlst.) Prain; Hieracium subobscuriceps (Zahn) Üksip; Hieracium paucifoliatum Boreau; Hieracium meridionale Arv.-Touv.; Hieracium neopinnatifidum Pugsley; Hieracium percissum Jord. ex Boreau; Hieracium pinnatifidum (Dahlst.) Lönnr. ex Dahlst.; Hieracium finitimum Boreau; Hieracium pseudodiaphanum (Dahlst.) Johanss.; Hieracium valmierense Üksip; Hieracium pseudoramosum Schur; Hieracium rudicaule Arv.-Touv.; Hieracium stipatiforme (Dahlst.) Dahlst.; Hieracium subampliatum (Dahlst.) Dahlst.; Hieracium subaustrinum Keld & Wiinst.; Hieracium subhastulatum (Zahn) Üksip; Hieracium stipatum T.Durand & B.D.Jacks.; Hieracium subirriguum (Dahlst.) Dahlst.; Hieracium subviriduliceps (Zahn) Schljakov; Hieracium tenuicaule Arv.-Touv.; Hieracium torticaule Arv.-Touv.; Hieracium tortifolium Boreau; Hieracium truncipilum (Thaisz & Zahn) Schljakov; Hieracium almquistianum Johanss.; Hieracium subviolascens P.D.Sell; plus many more names at level of subspecies

= Hieracium lachenalii =

Species of flowering plant

Hieracium lachenalii, or common hawkweed, is a species of plant in the tribe Cichorieae within the family Asteraceae. It is native to Europe but has become established as a weed in Australia and parts of North America.

== Taxonomy ==
The species was widely known for many years as H. vulgatum, but more recent studies have indicated that the two names represent the same species. The name H. lachenalii was coined in 1802, and H. vulgatum in 1819, so per taxonomic regulations, the older name is to be used, with H. vulgatum delegated to being a synonym.

== Description ==
This common weed can grow and produce flowers on plants that range from 4 inches (10 centimeters) to 36 inches (91 cm) tall. The rhizome is short and stout. The broadly elliptic leaves can be up to 5 inches (13 centimeters) long and taper with teeth towards the base. Each flower head has 40-80 ray florets but no disc florets. Bracts surround the flower head; the receptacle (basal part of the flower on which the florets are attached) is flat and naked; heads tend to start together then become somewhat solitary on long leafless stems. The stalks below the heads are covered with scattered, simple and gland-tipped black hairs and contain a milky substance.

The pale yellow flowers are produced during all of the summer months. The fruit are dark brown achenes.

== Common names ==
- Croatian: Obična runjika
- Dutch: Gewoon havikskruid
- German: Gewöhnliches Habichtskraut, Lachenals Habichtskraut
- English: Common Hawkweed
- French: Epervière de Lachenal
- Hungarian: Közönséges hölgymál
- Italian: Sparviere comune
- Latvian: Jakarda mauraga
- Polish: Jastrzębiec Lachenala
- Serbian: Maslačak
- Slovene: Lachenalova škržolica, Navadna škržolica
- Russian: Ястребинка Жаккара
- Welsh: Heboglys
- Swedish: Hagfibbla

== Distribution and habitat ==
Native to most of Europe, Hieracium lachenalii was introduced to temperate parts of North America, and to Australia. It can sometimes be found in soils that have been disturbed.

=== Europe ===
In Europe, the species is found in Austria, Belarus, Belgium, Bosnia-Herzegovina, Croatia, Corsica, the Czech Republic, Denmark, Estonia, France, Finland, Germany, Hungary, Ireland, Italy, Latvia,Liechtenstein, Lithuania, Luxemburg, Montenegro, Netherlands, North Macedonia, Norway, Poland, Portugal, Romania, San Marino, Serbia, Slovenia, Slovakia, Sweden, Switzerland, Ukraine, the United Kingdom, and Russia.

=== North America ===
Subarctic America: Greenland.

Canada: Provinces of British Columbia, New Brunswick, Newfoundland, Nova Scotia, Ontario, Prince Edward Island, and Quebec.

United States: States of Connecticut, Delaware, Maine, Massachusetts, Michigan, Minnesota, New Hampshire, New Jersey, New York, Oregon, Pennsylvania, Rhode Island, Vermont, Washington, and Wisconsin.

Distribution maps of Hieracium lachenalii.
