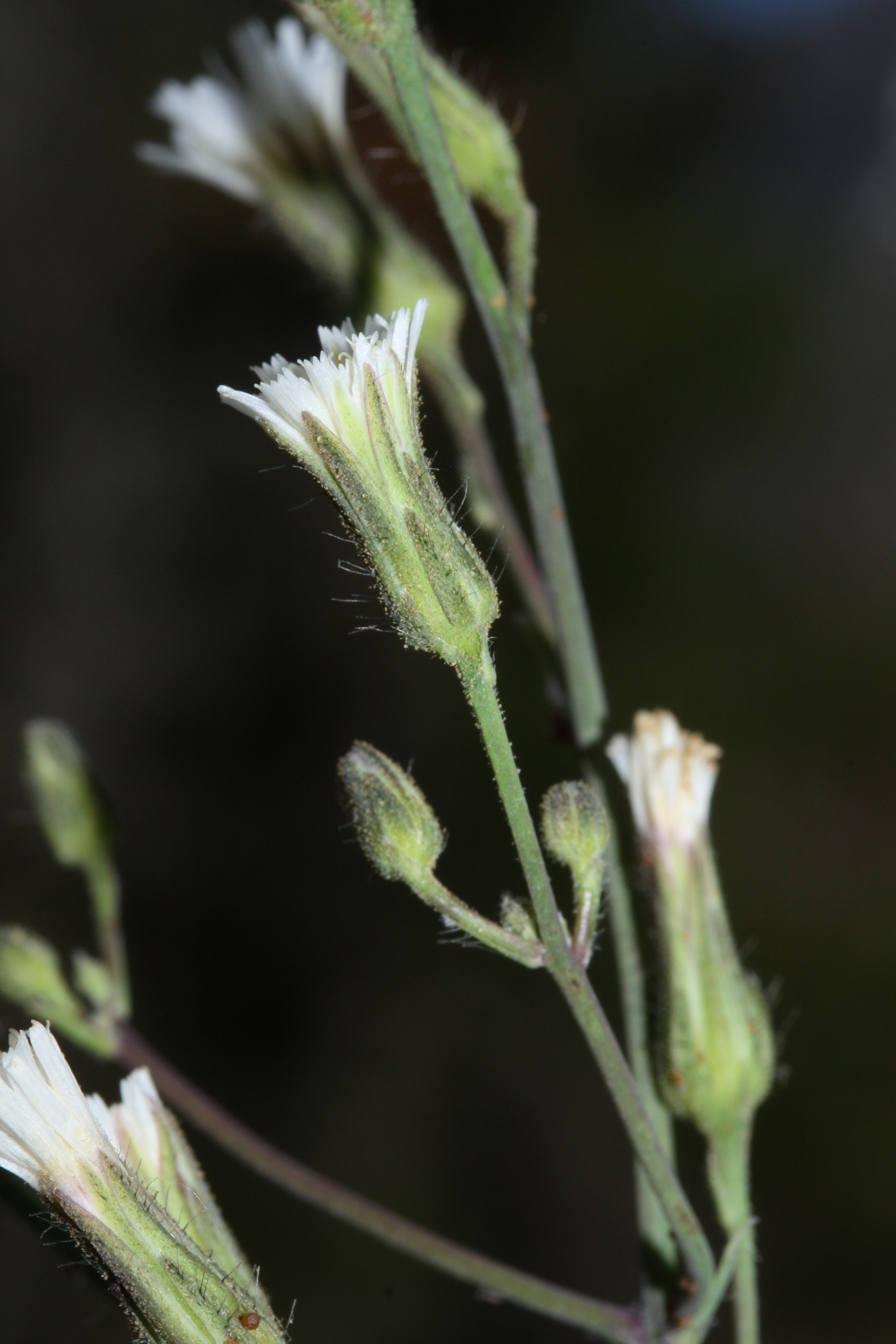

Conservation status
- Secure (NatureServe)

Scientific classification
- Kingdom: Plantae
- Clade: Embryophytes
- Clade: Tracheophytes
- Clade: Angiosperms
- Clade: Eudicots
- Clade: Asterids
- Order: Asterales
- Family: Asteraceae
- Genus: Hieracium
- Species: H. albiflorum

Binomial name
- Hieracium albiflorum Hook.

Synonyms
- List: Chlorocrepis albiflora (Hook.) W.A.Weber; Pilosella albiflora (Hook.) F.W.Schultz & Sch.Bip.; Hieracium helleri Gand.; Hieracium vancouverianum Arv.-Touv.

= Hieracium albiflorum =

Species of flowering plant in the daisy family

Hieracium albiflorum, known by the names white hawkweed and white-flowered hawkweed, is a common and widespread species of plant in the family Asteraceae.

Hieracium albiflorum is found in western North America, from Alaska and the Northwest Territories south to Mexico (Chihuahua, Sonora) and east to Manitoba and the Black Hills of South Dakota. There have been reports of populations in Québec and Wisconsin, but these are probably waifs or introductions.

Hieracium albiflorum is found in forests and woodlands at low to moderate elevation. It is similar to its relative the common dandelion, except for having more than one flower head per plant, sometimes 50 or more in a flat-topped array. Each head has 6–25 white (rather than yellow as in most related species) ray flowers but no disc flowers.
