= Hieracium spathulatum =

Scientific classification
- Kingdom: Plantae
- Clade: Tracheophytes
- Clade: Angiosperms
- Clade: Eudicots
- Clade: Asterids
- Order: Asterales
- Family: Asteraceae
- Genus: Hieracium
- Species: H. spathulatum

Binomial name
- Hieracium spathulatum Scheele 1863

Synonyms
- Synonymy: Hieracium aitanicum Pau; Hieracium castellanum Arv.-Touv.; Hieracium castellicola Sudre; Hieracium grosii Pau; Hieracium albacetum Arv.-Touv.; Hieracium ilergabonum Pau

Species of flowering plant

Hieracium spathulatum is a species of hawkweed in the family Asteraceae, native to Spain.

Subspecies

- Hieracium spathulatum subsp. albacetum (Arv.-Touv.) Greuter
- Hieracium spathulatum subsp. ilergabonum (Pau) Greuter
- Hieracium spathulatum subsp. spathulatum
- Hieracium spathulatum subsp. spathulatiforme (Zahn) Greuter
