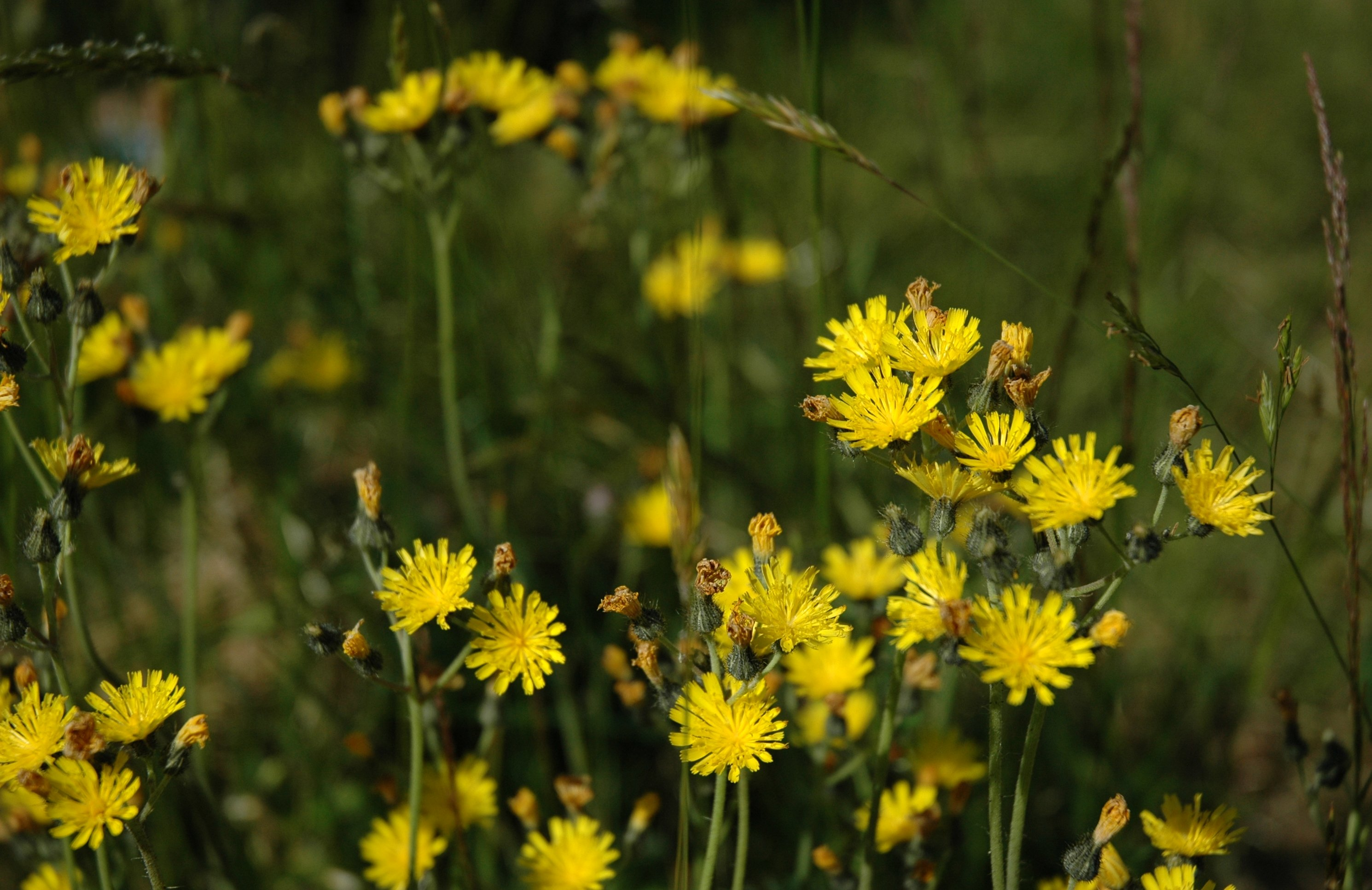
- Hieracium caespitosum

Scientific classification
- Kingdom: Plantae
- Clade: Tracheophytes
- Clade: Angiosperms
- Clade: Eudicots
- Clade: Asterids
- Order: Asterales
- Family: Asteraceae
- Subfamily: Cichorioideae
- Tribe: Cichorieae
- Subtribe: Hieraciinae
- Genus: Hieracium; L.

Synonyms
- Chlorocrepis; Crepidopsis Arv.-Touv.; Pilosella Vaill.

= Hieracium =

Genus of flowering plants

Hieracium (/haɪ.əˈræsiəm/), known by the common name hawkweed and classically as hierakion (from ancient Greek ἱέραξ, hierax 'hawk'), is a genus of flowering plant in the family Asteraceae, and closely related to dandelion (Taraxacum), chicory (Cichorium), prickly lettuce (Lactuca) and sow thistle (Sonchus), which are part of the tribe Cichorieae. Hawkweeds, with their 10,000+ recorded species and subspecies, do their part to make Asteraceae the second largest family of flowering plants. Some botanists group all these species or subspecies into approximately 800 accepted species, while others prefer to accept several thousand species. Since most hawkweeds reproduce exclusively asexually by means of seeds that are genetically identical to their mother plant (apomixis or agamospermy), clones or populations that consist of genetically identical plants are formed and some botanists (especially in UK, Scandinavia and Russia) prefer to accept these clones as good species (arguing that it is impossible to know how these clones are interrelated) whereas others (mainly in Central Europe and USA) try to group them into a few hundred more broadly defined species.

What is here treated as the single genus Hieracium is now treated by most European experts as two different genera, Hieracium and Pilosella, with species such as Hieracium pilosella, Hieracium floribundum and Hieracium aurantiacum referred to the latter genus. Many members of the genus Pilosella reproduce both by stolons (runners like those of strawberries) and by seeds, whereas true Hieracium species reproduce only by seeds. In Pilosella, many individual plants are capable of forming both normal sexual and asexual (apomictic) seeds, whereas individual plants of Hieracium only produce one kind of seeds. Another difference is that all species of Pilosella have leaves with smooth (entire) margins whereas most species of Hieracium have distinctly dentate to deeply cut or divided leaves.

== Description ==
=== Flowers and flower-heads ===
Hieracium or hawkweeds, like others in the family Asteraceae, mostly have yellow, tightly packed flower-heads of numerous small flowers but, unlike daisies and sunflowers in the same family, they have not two kinds of floret but only strap-shaped (spatulate) florets, each one of which is a complete flower in itself, not lacking stamens, and joined to the stem by leafy bracts. As in other members of the tribe Cichorieae, each ray corolla is tipped by 3 to 5 teeth.

=== Bracts, stems and leaves ===
Erect single glabrous or hairy stems, sometimes branched away from the point of attachment, sometimes branched throughout.

The hairiness of hawkweeds can be very complex: from surfaces with scattered to crowded, tapered, whiplike, straight or curly, smooth to setae; "stellate-pubescent" or surfaces with scattered to crowded, dendritically branched (often called, but seldom truly, "stellate") hairs; and "stipitate-glandular" or surfaces with scattered to crowded gland-tipped hairs mostly. Surfaces of stems, leaves, peduncles, and phyllaries may be glabrous or may bear one, two, or all three of the types of hairs mentioned above.

Like the other members of the Chicory tribe, hawkweeds contain a milky latex.

== Ecology ==
The large yellow underwing moth (Noctua pronuba) feeds on Hieracium species.

== Distribution ==
Hieracium species are native to Africa, Asia, Europe, North America, Central America and South America.

== Species ==
The classification of Hieracium into species is notoriously difficult. One reason is the apomictic reproduction (in which plants asexually produce seeds), which tends to produce a lot of minor geographical variation. Over 9000 species names have been published in Hieracium but some botanists regard many of those as synonyms of larger species.

=== Europe ===
- Hieracium lachenalii - Common hawkweed
- Hieracium attenboroughianum – Attenborough’s hawkweed
- Hieracium bakerianum
- Hieracium hethlandiae – Cliva Hill hawkweed
- Hieracium lepidulum Stenstr. ex Dahlst. – tussock hawkweed
- Hieracium lucidum Guss. – Sicilian sparviere
- Hieracium insolitum (Zahn) Üksip
- Hieracium villosum Jacq.

=== North America ===
The list below is a selection of species that have been accepted by the USDA Natural Resources Conservation Service and Canada. A more complete list is given in the list of Hieracium species.

- Hieracium albertinum – houndstongue hawkweed
- Hieracium albiflorum Hook. – white hawkweed
- Hieracium × alleghaniense Britt. (pro sp.)
- Hieracium argutum Nutt. – southern hawkweed
- Hieracium × atramentarium (Naegeli & Peter) Zahn ex Engl. (pro sp.)
- Hieracium atratum Fries – polar hawkweed
- Hieracium bolanderi Gray – Bolander's hawkweed
- Hieracium × brachiatum Berth. ex DC.
- Hieracium canadense Michx. – Canada hawkweed
- Hieracium carneum Greene – Huachuca hawkweed
- Hieracium × fassettii Lepage
- Hieracium fendleri Schultz-Bip. – yellow hawkweed
- Hieracium × fernaldii Lepage
- Hieracium × fuscatrum Naegeli & Peter (pro sp.)
- Hieracium glomeratum Froel. – queen-devil hawkweed
- Hieracium gracile Hook. – slender hawkweed
- Hieracium greenei Gray – Greene's hawkweed
- Hieracium greenii Porter & Britt. – Maryland hawkweed
- Hieracium × grohii Lepage
- Hieracium gronovii L. – queendevil
- Hieracium horridum Fries – prickly hawkweed
- Hieracium kalmii L. – Kalm's hawkweed
- Hieracium lachenalii K.C. Gmel. – common hawkweed
- Hieracium laevigatum Willd. – smooth hawkweed
- Hieracium lemmonii Gray – Lemmon's hawkweed
- Hieracium longiberbe T.J. Howell – longbeard hawkweed
- Hieracium longipilum Torr. – hairy hawkweed
- Hieracium maculatum Sm. – spotted hawkweed
- Hieracium marianum Willd. – Maryland hawkweed
- Hieracium megacephalum Nash – coastal plain hawkweed
- Hieracium murorum L. – wall hawkweed
- Hieracium paniculatum L. – Allegheny hawkweed
- Hieracium parryi Zahn in H.G.A. Engler – Parry hawkweed
- Hieracium piloselloides Vill. – tall hawkweed
- Hieracium praealtum Vill. ex Gochnat – kingdevil
- Hieracium pringlei Gray – Pringle's hawkweed
- Hieracium robinsonii (Zahn) Fern. – Robinson's hawkweed
- Hieracium rusbyi Greene – Rusby's hawkweed
- Hieracium sabaudum L. – New England hawkweed
- Hieracium scabrum Michx. – rough hawkweed
- Hieracium schultzii Fries – roughstem hawkweed
- Hieracium scouleri Hook. – Scouler's woollyweed
- Hieracium scribneri Small – Scribner's hawkweed
- Hieracium traillii – Maryland hawkweed
- Hieracium triste Willd. ex Spreng. – woolly hawkweed
- Hieracium umbellatum L. – narrowleaf hawkweed
- Hieracium venosum L. – rattlesnakeweed

Some species are now placed in the genus Pilosella:

- Hieracium aurantiacum L., syn. of Pilosella aurantiaca – orange hawkweed
- Hieracium caespitosum Dumort., syn. of Pilosella caespitosa – meadow hawkweed
- Hieracium flagellare Willd., syn. of Pilosella flagellaris – whiplash hawkweed
- Hieracium floribundum Wimmer & Grab., syn. of Pilosella floribunda – kingdevil hawkweed
- Hieracium lactucella Wallr., syn. of Pilosella lactucella – European hawkweed
- Hieracium pilosella L., syn. of Pilosella officinarum – mouse-ear hawkweed

== Plant pest ==
All species of the genus Hieracium are classed as invasive species throughout New Zealand. They are banned from sale, propagation and distribution under the National Pest Plant Accord. Hieracium is a pasture weed that reduces available feed for livestock and displaces the indigenous plants. It is a particular threat in alpine ecosystems previously dominated by native tussocks, though it will colonise habitats from bare ground, to exotic pine forest, to native Southern Beech forest.

In the United States, many species of Hieracium have been introduced and all species present are considered noxious weeds in one or more states.

In Australia, hawkweeds are invasive pests in alpine regions, all species of Hieracium are listed or declared under various State Acts.
