= Hieracium rigorosum =

Hieracium rigorosum, a name for a plant in the hawkweed genus Hieracium, has been identified as synonyms of two different species:

- Hieracium canadense
- Hieracium laevigatum
