= Hieracium stiptocaule =

Hieracium stiptocaule, a name for a plant in the hawkweed genus Hieracium, is a synonym of two different species:

- Hieracium canadense
- Hieracium laevigatum
