= Hieracium nepiocratum =

Hieracium nepiocratum, a name for a plant in the hawkweed genus Hieracium, has been identified a synonym of two different species:

- Hieracium canadense
- Hieracium laevigatum
