= Hieracium eugenii =

Hieracium eugenii, a name for a plant in the hawkweed genus Hieracium, has been identified as a synonym of two different species:

- Hieracium canadense
- Hieracium laevigatum
