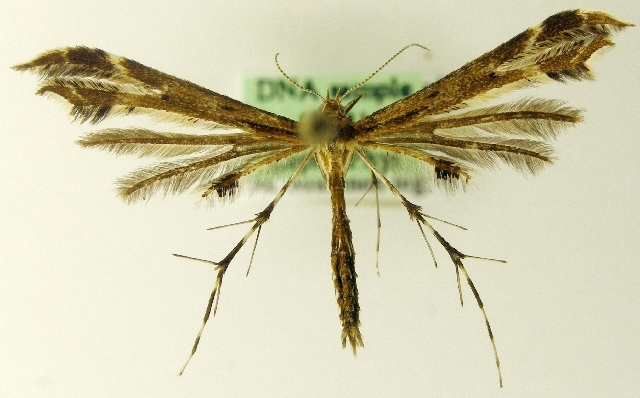

Scientific classification
- Kingdom: Animalia
- Phylum: Arthropoda
- Class: Insecta
- Order: Lepidoptera
- Family: Pterophoridae
- Genus: Oxyptilus
- Species: O. chrysodactyla

Binomial name
- Oxyptilus chrysodactyla (Denis & Schiffermuller, 1775)

Synonyms
- Alycita chrysodactyla Denis & Schiffermüller, 1775; Alucita chrysodactyla; Pterophorus hieracii Zeller, 1841

= Oxyptilus chrysodactyla =

Species of plume moth

Oxyptilus chrysodactyla is a moth of the family Pterophoridae. It is found in most of Europe, except most of the Balkan Peninsula, Great Britain, Ireland and Portugal.

The wingspan is 15–21 millimetres (0.59–0.83 in). Adults are brown.

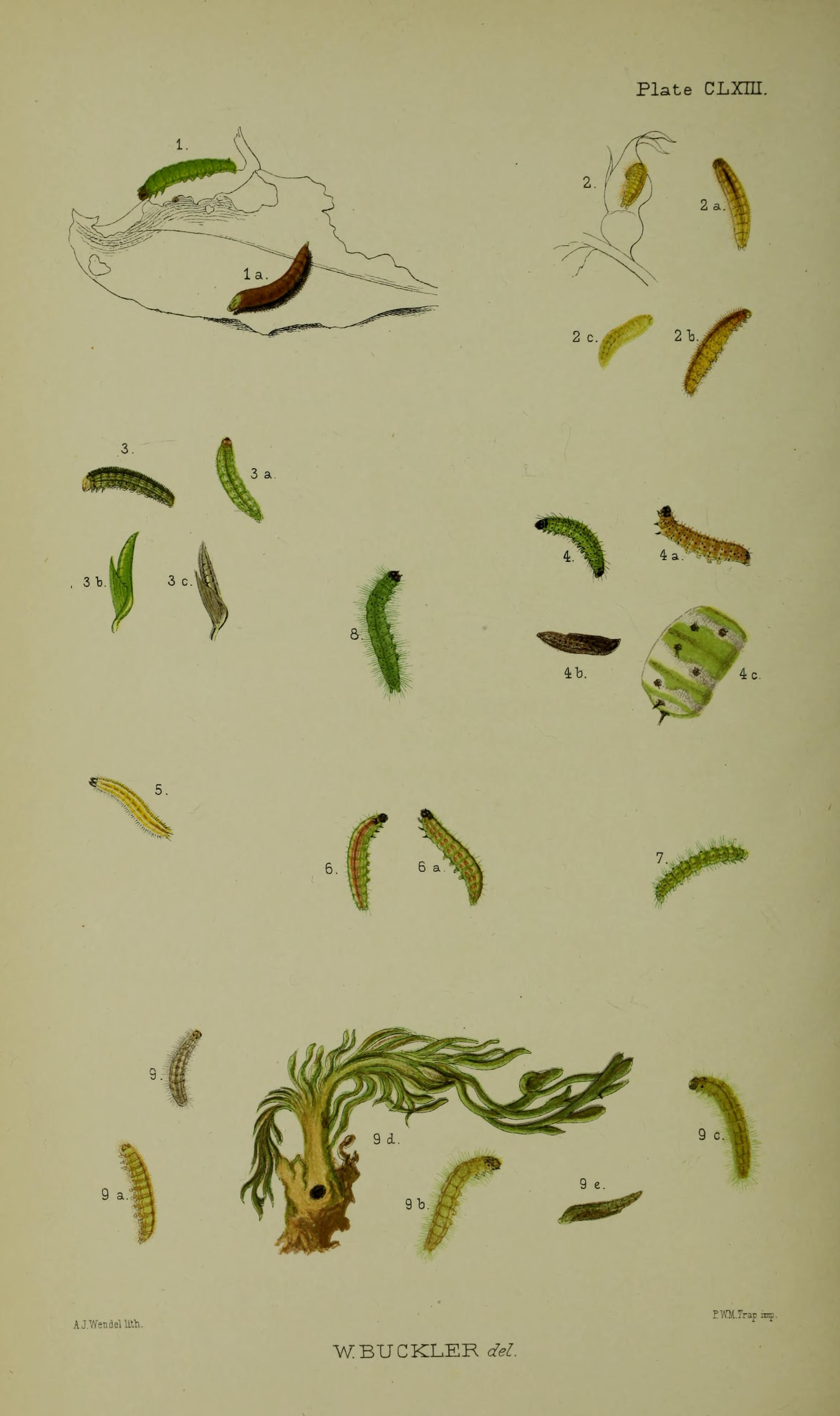
Fig. 7 larva after final moult

The larvae feed on Hieracium umbellatum, Hieracium amplexicaule, Hieracium sabaudum and Picris hieracioides. They feed in the heart of their host plant and later spin the top-leaves together.
