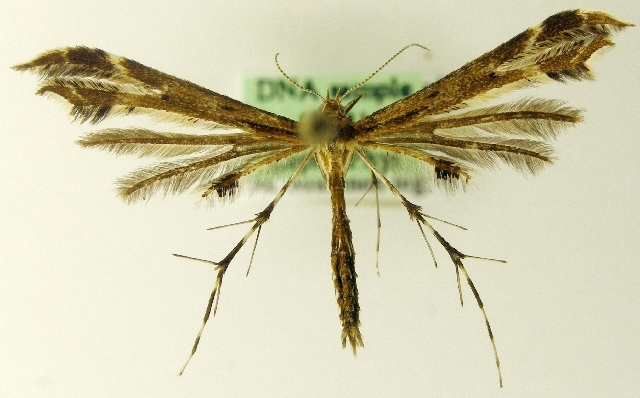
- Oxyptilus chrysodactyla

Scientific classification
- Kingdom: Animalia
- Phylum: Arthropoda
- Class: Insecta
- Order: Lepidoptera
- Family: Pterophoridae
- Tribe: Oxyptilini
- Genus: Oxyptilus; Zeller, 1841

= Oxyptilus =

Plume moth genus

Oxyptilus is a genus of moths in the family Pterophoridae described by Philipp Christoph Zeller in 1841.

== Species ==
- Oxyptilus catathectes
- Oxyptilus causodes Meyrick, 1905
- Oxyptilus celebratus
- Oxyptilus chrysodactyla
- Oxyptilus cinctipedalis
- Oxyptilus delawaricus
- Oxyptilus epidectis Meyrick, 1908
- Oxyptilus erebites
- Oxyptilus ericetorum
- Oxyptilus erythrodactylus D. S. Fletcher, 1911
- Oxyptilus idonealis
- Oxyptilus insomnis
- Oxyptilus mycites
- Oxyptilus orichalcias
- Oxyptilus parvidactyla
- Oxyptilus pilosellae
- Oxyptilus praedator
- Oxyptilus regulus
- Oxyptilus scutifer
- Oxyptilus secutor
- Oxyptilus variegatus
- Oxyptilus wallecei

Former species included in this genus are:

- Oxyptilus anthites Meyrick, 1936
