= Oxyptilus mycites =

Scientific classification
- Kingdom: Animalia
- Phylum: Arthropoda
- Class: Insecta
- Order: Lepidoptera
- Family: Pterophoridae
- Genus: Oxyptilus
- Species: O. mycites

Binomial name
- Oxyptilus mycites Meyrick, 1914

Synonyms
- Nippoptilia mycites

Species of plume moth

Oxyptilus mycites is a moth of the family Pterophoridae. It is found in Taiwan. The Global Lepidoptera Names Index lists it as a synonym of Nippoptilia vitis.
