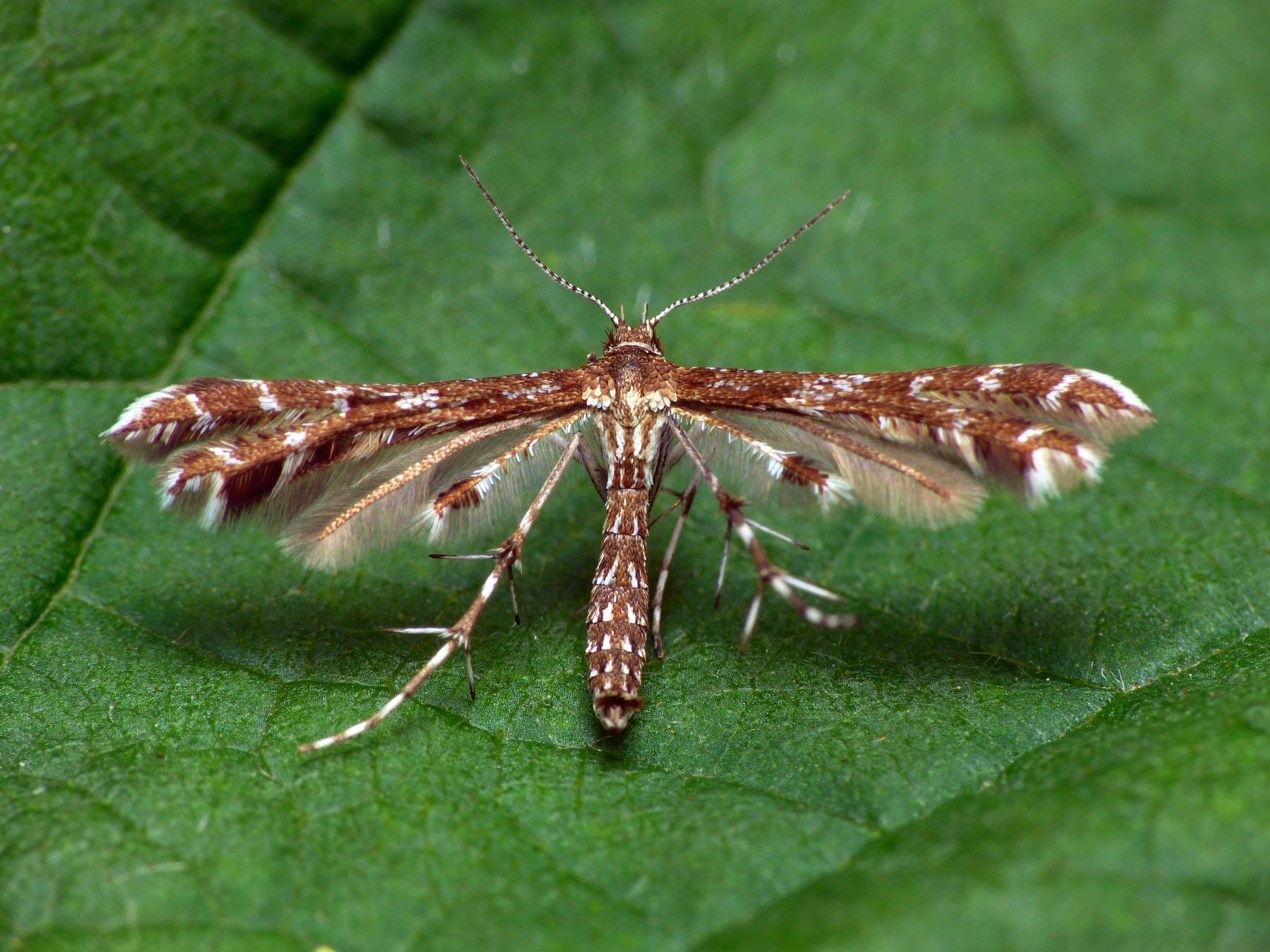

Scientific classification
- Kingdom: Animalia
- Phylum: Arthropoda
- Class: Insecta
- Order: Lepidoptera
- Family: Pterophoridae
- Genus: Oxyptilus
- Species: O. parvidactyla

Binomial name
- Oxyptilus parvidactyla (Haworth, 1811)

Synonyms
- List: Alucita parvidactyla Haworth, 1811; Pterophorus obscura Zeller, 1841; Oxyptilus hoffmannseggi Möschler, 1866; Oxyptilus maroccanensis Amsel, 1956; Oxyptilus parvidactylus

= Oxyptilus parvidactyla =

Species of plume moth

Oxyptilus parvidactyla, also known as the small plume, is a moth of the family Pterophoridae found in Africa, America latina, Asia and Europe. It was first described by Adrian Hardy Haworth in 1811.

== Description ==
The wingspan is 13–18 millimetres (0.51–0.71 in). The forewings are dark reddish-fuscous, somewhat white-sprinkled. There two distinct white bars on the segments. The cilia with patches of black scales, costal and dorsal barred with white. The hindwings are dark fuscous, the third segment dark reddish-fuscous, with an apical patch of black scales in upper cilia and a whitish spot in apical cilia. There is a large, black, apical dorsal scale-tooth . This moth is similar looking to other related species and can only be safely identified by dissection, or by rearing the larvae on known foodplants.

== Biology ==
Adults are on wing from May to August in western Europe and there is one generation per year. Early instar larvae feed on the young leaves of Hieracium species, including mouse-ear hawkweed (Hieracium pilosella) and possibly smooth hawkweed (Hieracium laevigatum). Later instars feed on the flowerheads.

== Distribution ==
The small plume is found in almost all of Europe, as well as Russia, Asia Minor and North Africa.
