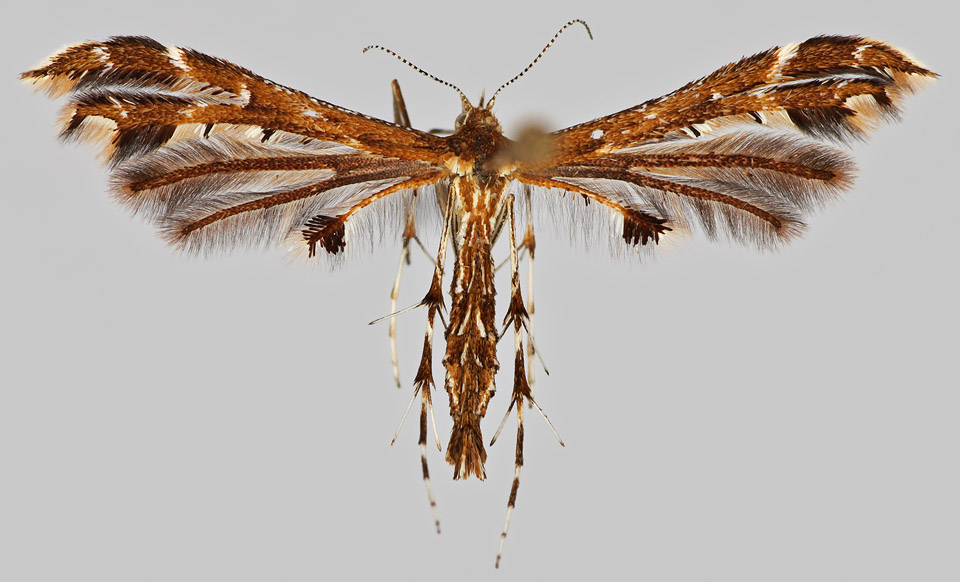

Scientific classification
- Kingdom: Animalia
- Phylum: Arthropoda
- Clade: Pancrustacea
- Class: Insecta
- Order: Lepidoptera
- Family: Pterophoridae
- Genus: Oxyptilus
- Species: O. ericetorum

Binomial name
- Oxyptilus ericetorum (Stainton, 1851)

Synonyms
- Pterophorus ericetorum Stainton, 1851

= Oxyptilus ericetorum =

Species of plume moth

Oxyptilus ericetorum is a moth of the family Pterophoridae. It is found in most of Europe (except Iceland, Ireland, Great Britain, the Benelux, Croatia, Hungary and Ukraine), east to Siberia.

The wingspan is 16–19 millimetres (0.63–0.75 in).

The larvae feed on Hieracium pilosella and Hieracium murorum.
