= Nippoptilia pullum =

Scientific classification
- Kingdom: Animalia
- Phylum: Arthropoda
- Class: Insecta
- Order: Lepidoptera
- Family: Pterophoridae
- Genus: Nippoptilia
- Species: N. pullum

Binomial name
- Nippoptilia pullum Gielis & De Vos, 2007

Species of plume moth

Nippoptilia pullum is a moth of the family Pterophoridae, that is known from Papua New Guinea.
