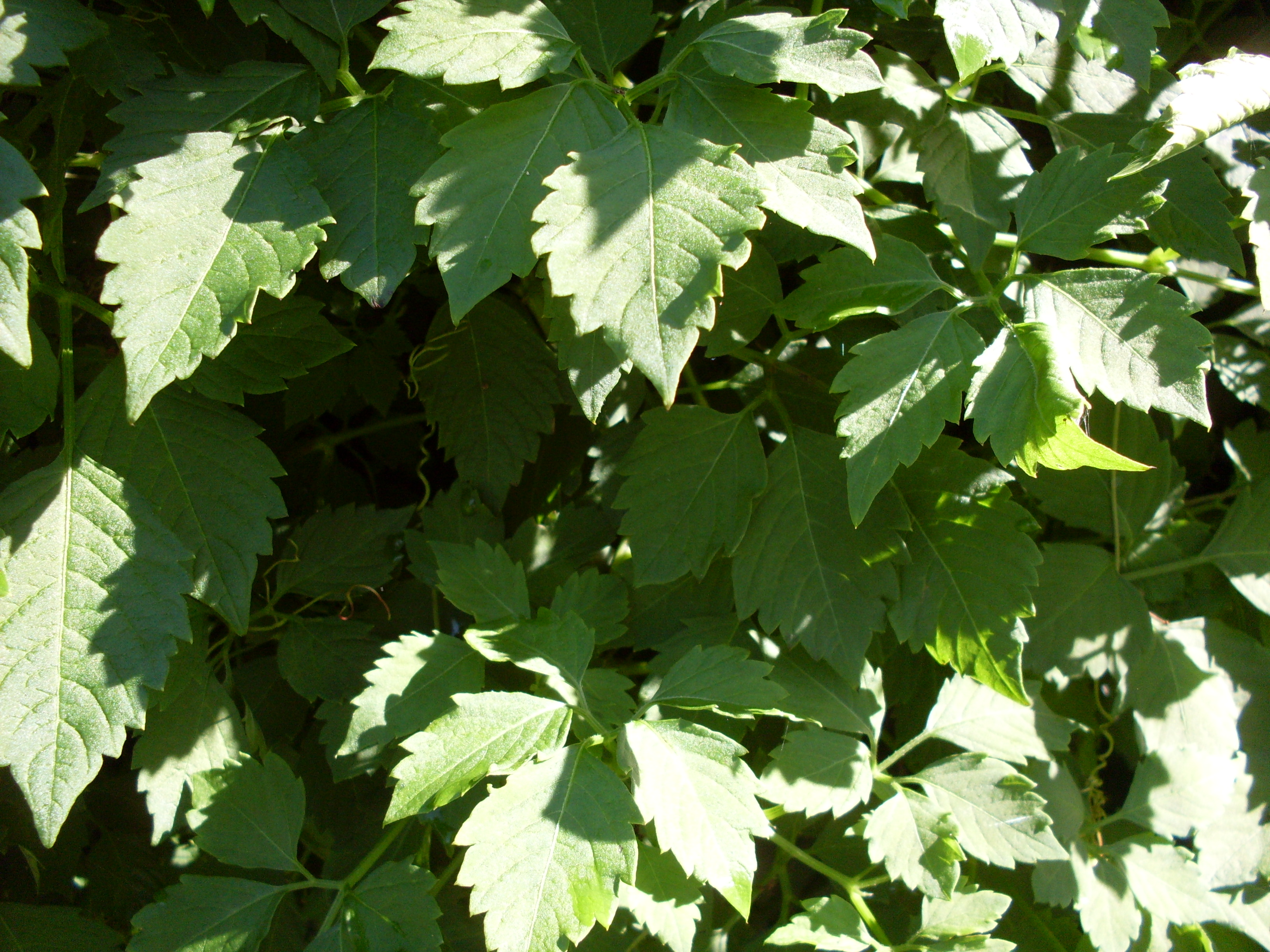
- Native Grape – at Lilli Pilli, Sydney

Scientific classification
- Kingdom: Plantae
- Clade: Tracheophytes
- Clade: Angiosperms
- Clade: Eudicots
- Clade: Rosids
- Order: Vitales
- Family: Vitaceae
- Tribe: Cayratieae
- Genus: Causonis
- Species: C. clematidea

Binomial name
- Causonis clematidea (F.Muell.) Jackes

Synonyms
- Cayratia clematidea (F.Muell.) Domin; Vitis clematidea F.Muell.; Cissus clematidea (F.Muell.) Domin

= Causonis clematidea =

Native grape

Species of grapevine

Causonis clematidea, known as the native grape, slender grape and bushy water vine, is a vine in the grape family that is native to the tropical and subtropical regions of eastern Australia. It produces dark, glossy grape-like berries.

== Description ==
C. clematidea is a climbing plant with stems up to 2 m long, pubescent or glabrous, with underground stems that usually form small tubers, with two tendrils or several arms, without adhesive discs. A weak climber, the stem diameter does not exceed 2 cm, although older stems can get woody.

The leaves are compound with a larger terminal leaflet, usually pentafoliate, ovate to elliptic, 1-8 cm long, and 0.5-4 cm wide. The apex (leaf tip) is acuminate to acute, obtuse the cuneate base, the margins deeply toothed, the surfaces matte and ± glabrous, with a petiole 1-8 cm long. Stipules are triangular, about 1.5 mm long. The large tuber will have new foliage sprouting each spring, that dies away in autumn.

It is evergreen in warmer areas and often deciduous in cooler zones. In Australia, it should not be confused with the common alien weed Cardiospermum halicacabum (the balloon vine) as both have compound leaves with toothed margins, except the native vine has five leaflets and is hairless, while the weed has nine leaflets.

=== Inflorescences ===
Growing on many-branched stems, small pink-greenish, cup-like flowers, with prominent central stigma, occur in summer, although they can appear all year round. The inflorescences with peduncles higher than the leaves. Disk is entire and the embryo is around 1 mm long. The petals are 2.5 mm long, green. Filaments are 0.75 mm long and anthers are 0.75 mm long.

The fruit is globose to obovoid, with a diameter of 5-7 mm in diameter, shiny and blackish in colour. Fruiting occurs most of the year, but more often in autumn. Seeds number to four per fruit, and are about 4 x 4 mm. Radicle is longer though somewhat narrower than the cotyledons.

== Distribution ==
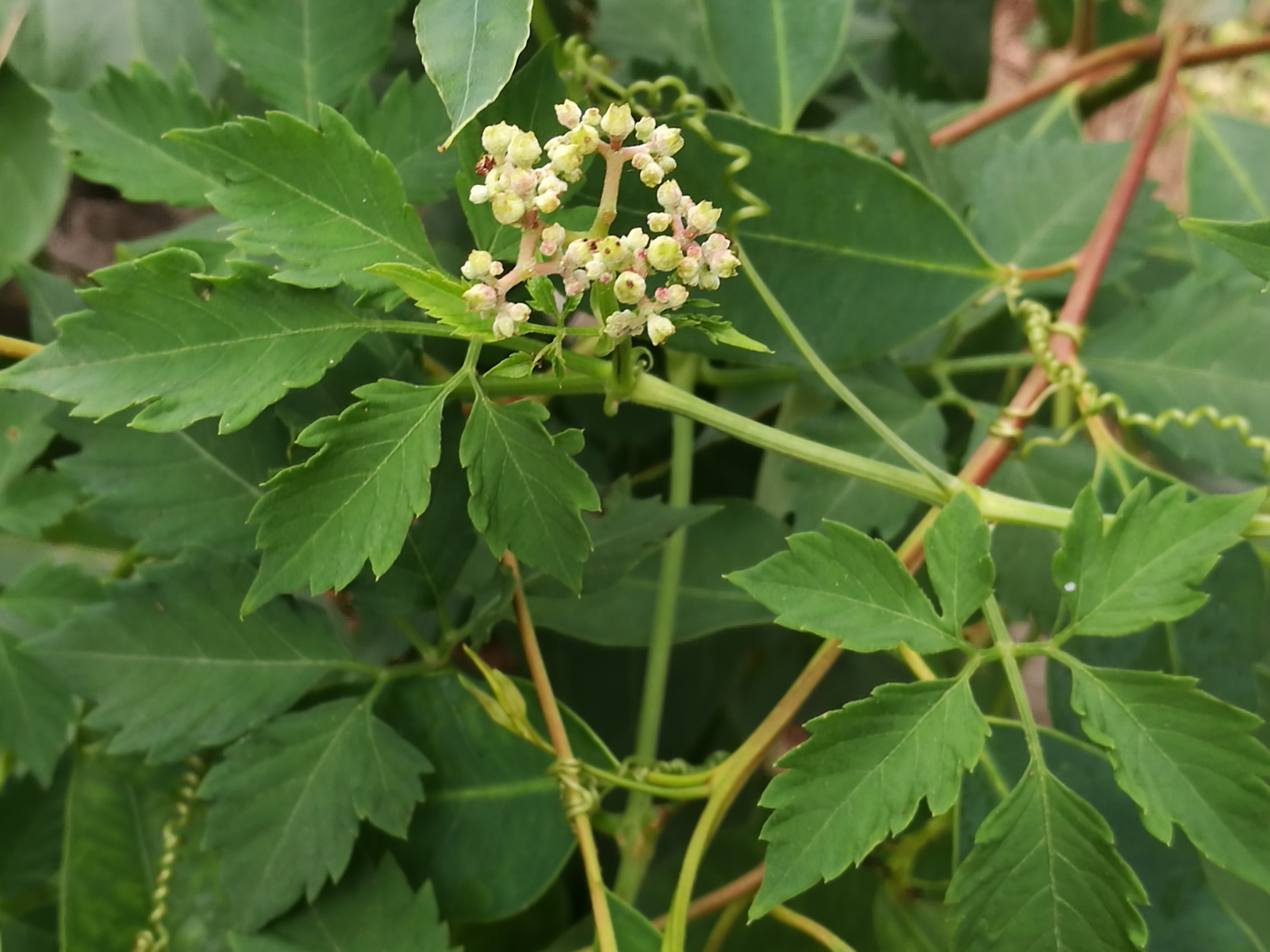
Inflorescences

It is found growing in the wet sclerophyll forests and woodlands from the Shoalhaven River gorges in southern New South Wales, to northeastern Queensland in the tropical forests at around the Townsville area. It thrives within humid, shaded areas, where it can be seen climbing over rocks and shrubs, usually on rainforest margins.

It is normally present in vine thickets and monsoon forest in northeastern Queensland, and in the south it is common along creek banks or riparian zones (Coastal Swamp Oak Forests). Altitudinal range in northeastern Queensland is from 80 to 750 metres (260 to 2,460 ft). It can also be found on farmlands in its distribution zone, but it is treated as a weed due to its fast-growing, smothering nature.

== Uses ==
Preferring full sun to part shade, it can be useful for cultivation in the garden as the blackish berries and tubers are edible, although the berries do not have a strong flavor. Moreover, the flowers attract birds and moth caterpillars to the garden. Historically, Aboriginal Australians used the tubers of the native grape and as well as Cissus opaca as a "yam", where they prepared the tubers by pounding them on stones before roasting them.

Such birds attracted to its flowers include, the Australian king parrot, Blue-faced Honeyeater, Brown Cuckoo-dove, Channel-billed Cuckoo, Common Koel, Crimson Rosella, Lewin's Honeyeater, Little Lorikeet, Noisy Friarbird, Pacific Emerald Dove, Red-winged Parrot, Rose-crowned Fruit-dove, Scaly-breasted Lorikeet and the Pied Currawong, among many others.

== Taxonomy ==
The slender grape was formally named by Ferdinand von Mueller in 1861 as Vitis clematidea, later reclassified into the genus Causonis by Betsy Rivers Jackes in the 1990s. In 2020, Jackes relocated three Australian species (i.e., C. clematidea, C. eurynema and C. maritima) to the Causonis genus. The present molecular study verifies the sister relationship between C. australasica and C. clematidea. The two aforementioned species make a clade distinct from the Asian C. japonica clade in the chloroplast and the nuclear phylogenies.
