= Nippoptilia distigmata =

Scientific classification
- Domain: Eukaryota
- Kingdom: Animalia
- Phylum: Arthropoda
- Class: Insecta
- Order: Lepidoptera
- Family: Pterophoridae
- Genus: Nippoptilia
- Species: N. distigmata

Binomial name
- Nippoptilia distigmata S. Kim & B.K. Byun, 2010

Species of plume moth

Nippoptilia distigmata is a moth of the family Pterophoridae. It is known from Korea.

The wingspan is 15–16 millimetres (0.59–0.63 in).
