= Oxyptilus epidectis =

Scientific classification
- Kingdom: Animalia
- Phylum: Arthropoda
- Class: Insecta
- Order: Lepidoptera
- Family: Pterophoridae
- Genus: Oxyptilus
- Species: O. epidectis

Binomial name
- Oxyptilus epidectis Meyrick, 1908

Species of plume moth

Oxyptilus epidectis is a moth of the family Pterophoridae, that is known from Mauritius, India, Myanmar and Sri Lanka.

The larvae have been recorded feeding on Biophytum sensitivum.
