= Nippoptilia philippensis =

Scientific classification
- Kingdom: Animalia
- Phylum: Arthropoda
- Class: Insecta
- Order: Lepidoptera
- Family: Pterophoridae
- Genus: Nippoptilia
- Species: N. philippensis

Binomial name
- Nippoptilia philippensis Gielis, 2003

Species of plume moth

Nippoptilia philippensis is a moth of the family Pterophoridae. It is known from Mindanao and Mindoro.

The wingspan is 15–19 millimetres (0.59–0.75 in). Adults are on wing in January, from May to June and in August.

== Etymology ==
The name of the species reflects the country of its origin.
