= Nippoptilia issikii =

Scientific classification
- Domain: Eukaryota
- Kingdom: Animalia
- Phylum: Arthropoda
- Class: Insecta
- Order: Lepidoptera
- Family: Pterophoridae
- Genus: Nippoptilia
- Species: N. issikii

Binomial name
- Nippoptilia issikii Yano, 1961

Species of plume moth

Nippoptilia issikii is a moth of the family Pterophoridae, that is known from Japan (Hokkaido), and Korea and China.

The wingspan is 14–16 millimetres (0.55–0.63 in) and the length of the forewings is 8–9 millimetres (0.31–0.35 in).

The larvae feed on the fruit of Vitis vinifera.
