= Oxyptilus catathectes =

Scientific classification
- Kingdom: Animalia
- Phylum: Arthropoda
- Class: Insecta
- Order: Lepidoptera
- Family: Pterophoridae
- Genus: Oxyptilus
- Species: O. catathectes

Binomial name
- Oxyptilus catathectes Meyrick, 1933

Species of plume moth

Oxyptilus catathectes is a moth of the family Pterophoridae, that can be found in Indonesia (Java).
