= Oxyptilus scutifer =

Scientific classification
- Kingdom: Animalia
- Phylum: Arthropoda
- Class: Insecta
- Order: Lepidoptera
- Family: Pterophoridae
- Genus: Oxyptilus
- Species: O. scutifer

Binomial name
- Oxyptilus scutifer Meyrick, 1930

Species of plume moth

Oxyptilus scutifer is a species of moth in the genus Oxyptilus known from Costa Rica and Ecuador. Moths of this species take flight in March and have a wingspan of about 11–14 millimetres (0.43–0.55 in).
