= Oxyptilus variegatus =

Scientific classification
- Kingdom: Animalia
- Phylum: Arthropoda
- Class: Insecta
- Order: Lepidoptera
- Family: Pterophoridae
- Genus: Oxyptilus
- Species: O. variegatus

Binomial name
- Oxyptilus variegatus Meyrick, 1920

Species of plume moth

Oxyptilus variegatus is a moth of the family Pterophoridae. It is known from South Africa.
