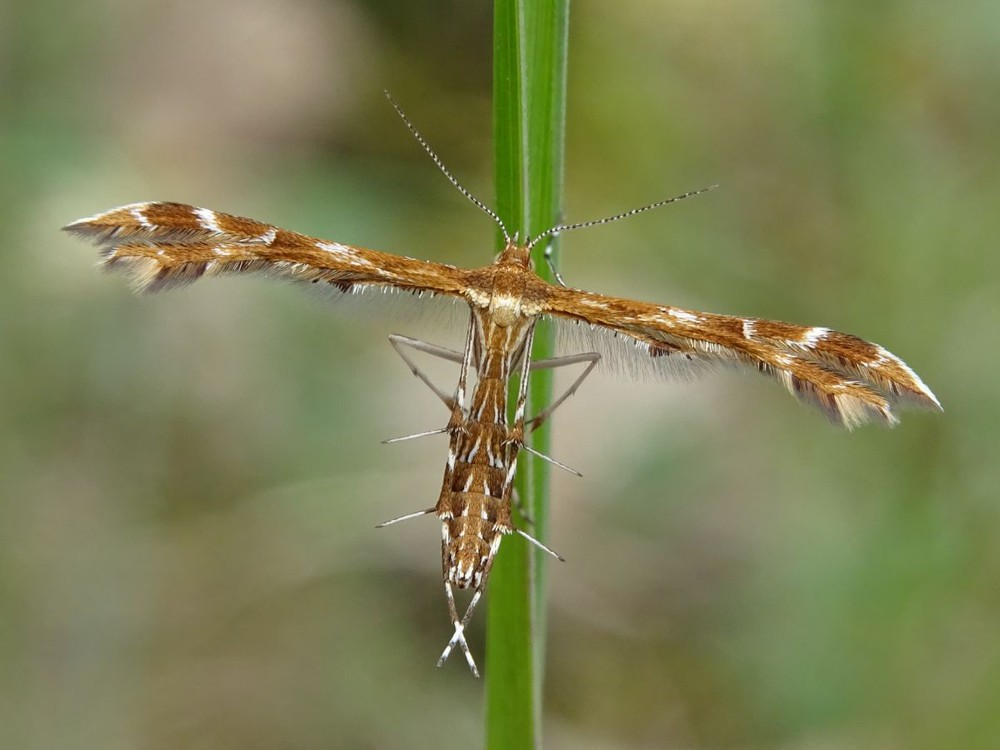

Scientific classification
- Kingdom: Animalia
- Phylum: Arthropoda
- Class: Insecta
- Order: Lepidoptera
- Family: Pterophoridae
- Genus: Oxyptilus
- Species: O. pilosellae

Binomial name
- Oxyptilus pilosellae (Zeller, 1841)

Synonyms
- Pterophorus pilosellae Zeller, 1841; Pterophorus pilosellae var. bohemanni Wallengren, 1862

= Oxyptilus pilosellae =

Species of plume moth

Oxyptilus pilosellae (hieracium plume moth) is a moth of the family Pterophoridae first described by Philipp Christoph Zeller in 1841. It is found in most of Europe, east to Russia and Asia Minor. It was released as a biological control agent for Hieracium in New Zealand in 1998.

== Description ==
The wingspan is 15–24 mm. Adults are on wing from May to August in western Europe.

Young larvae feed within the roots of hawkweeds (Hieracium species), including mouse-ear hawkweed (Hieracium pilosella). Later instars feed on the flowerheads, beneath a silken web.
