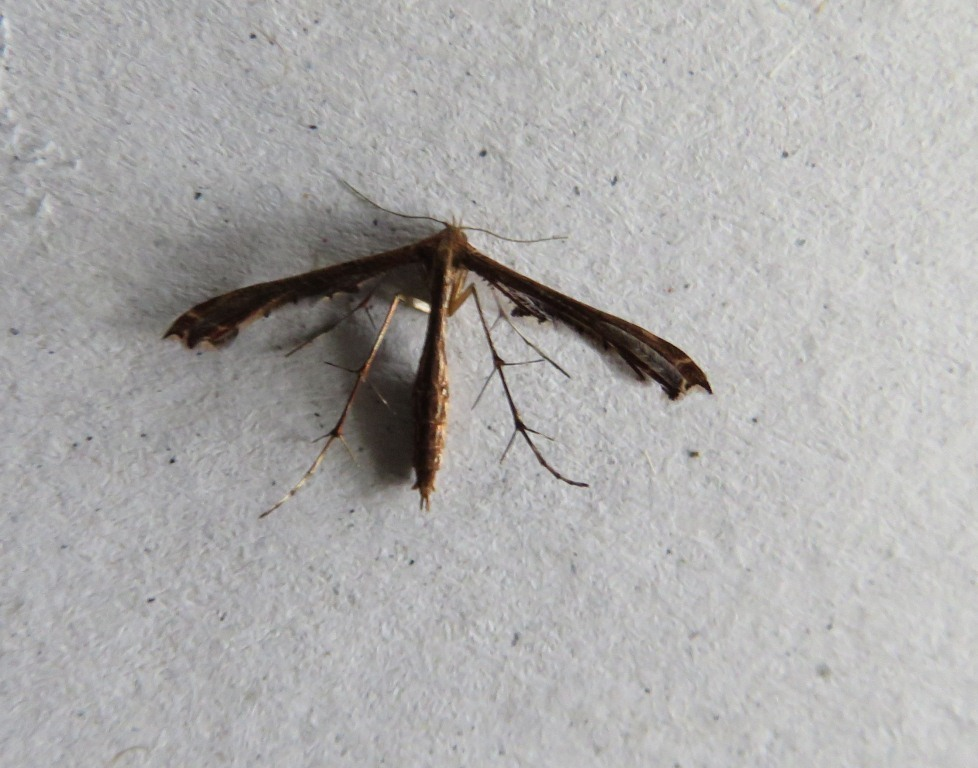
- Oxyptilus causodes, Queensland

Scientific classification
- Kingdom: Animalia
- Phylum: Arthropoda
- Class: Insecta
- Order: Lepidoptera
- Family: Pterophoridae
- Genus: Oxyptilus
- Species: O. causodes

Binomial name
- Oxyptilus causodes Meyrick, 1905

= Oxyptilus causodes =

Species of plume moth

Oxyptilus causodes is a moth of the family Pterophoridae. It is known from India, Sri Lanka, Myanmar and was recently discovered in New Guinea and Australia.

The wingspan is about 15 millimetres (0.59 in).

The larvae feed on the fruits of Dillenia retusa and Dillenia indica. Full-grown larvae emerge from the fallen fruit to pupate. This can take place on any neighbouring object. The larva pupates very rapidly, twelve hours is sufficient for it to emerge from the fruit, select a suitable place for pupation, suspend itself, and complete the metamorphosis.
