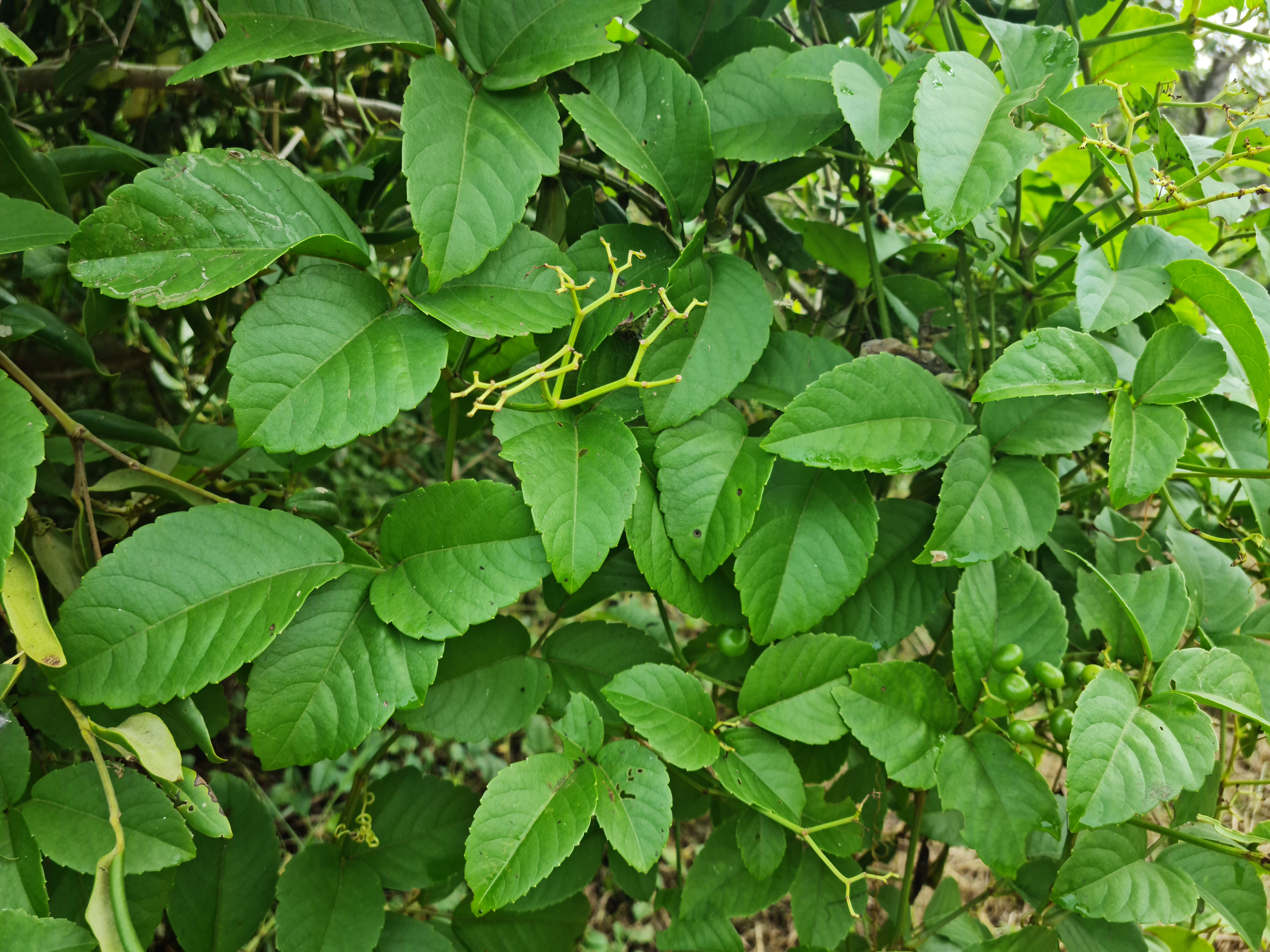
- Leaves and ripe fruit in Rajbari, Bangladesh

Scientific classification
- Kingdom: Plantae
- Clade: Tracheophytes
- Clade: Angiosperms
- Clade: Eudicots
- Clade: Rosids
- Order: Vitales
- Family: Vitaceae
- Genus: Causonis
- Species: C. trifolia

Binomial name
- Causonis trifolia (L.) Mabb. & J.Wen

Synonyms
- 13 synonyms: Cayratia trifolia (L.) Domin; Cissus trifolia (L.) K.Schum.; Columella trifolia (L.) Merr.; Vitis trifolia L.; Cayratia carnosa (Lam.) Gagnep.; Cayratia trifolia var. cinerea (Lam.) Gagnep.; Cissus carnosa Lam.; Cissus cinerea Lam.; Cissus psoraliifolia (F.Muell.) Planch.; Vitis carnosa (Lam.) Wall.; Vitis crenata Wall.; Vitis psoraliifolia F.Muell.; Vitis scabicaulis Wall.

= Causonis trifolia =

Species of vine

Causonis trifolia commonly known as bush grape, fox-grape, three-leaved wild vine or threeleaf cayratia is a species of plant native to regions from India, through Southeast Asia to Australia and the western Pacific Ocean. It is a vine with a stem diameter up to 7 cm (2.8 in), trifoliate leaves and blackish berries. Its leaves contain several flavonoids, such as cyanidin and delphinidin. Hydrocyanic acid is present in the stem, leaves and roots.

== Distribution ==
Causonis trifolia is native to these areas (as defined in the World Geographical Scheme for Recording Plant Distributions):

- Indian subcontinent: Assam, Bangladesh, East Himalaya, India, Laccadive Islands, Nepal, Pakistan, Sri Lanka, West Himalaya
- Indo-China: Andaman Islands, Cambodia, Laos, Myanmar, Nicobar Islands, South China Sea, Thailand, Vietnam
- Malesia: Borneo, Jawa, Lesser Sunda Islands, Malaya, Maluku, Philippines, Sulawesi, Sumatera, Christmas Islands
- Papuasia: Bismarck Archipelago, New Guinea, Solomon Islands
- Australasia: Northern Territory, Queensland, Western Australia
- Southwestern Pacific: New Caledonia, Vanuatu
- Northwestern Pacific: Caroline Islands

== Gallery ==
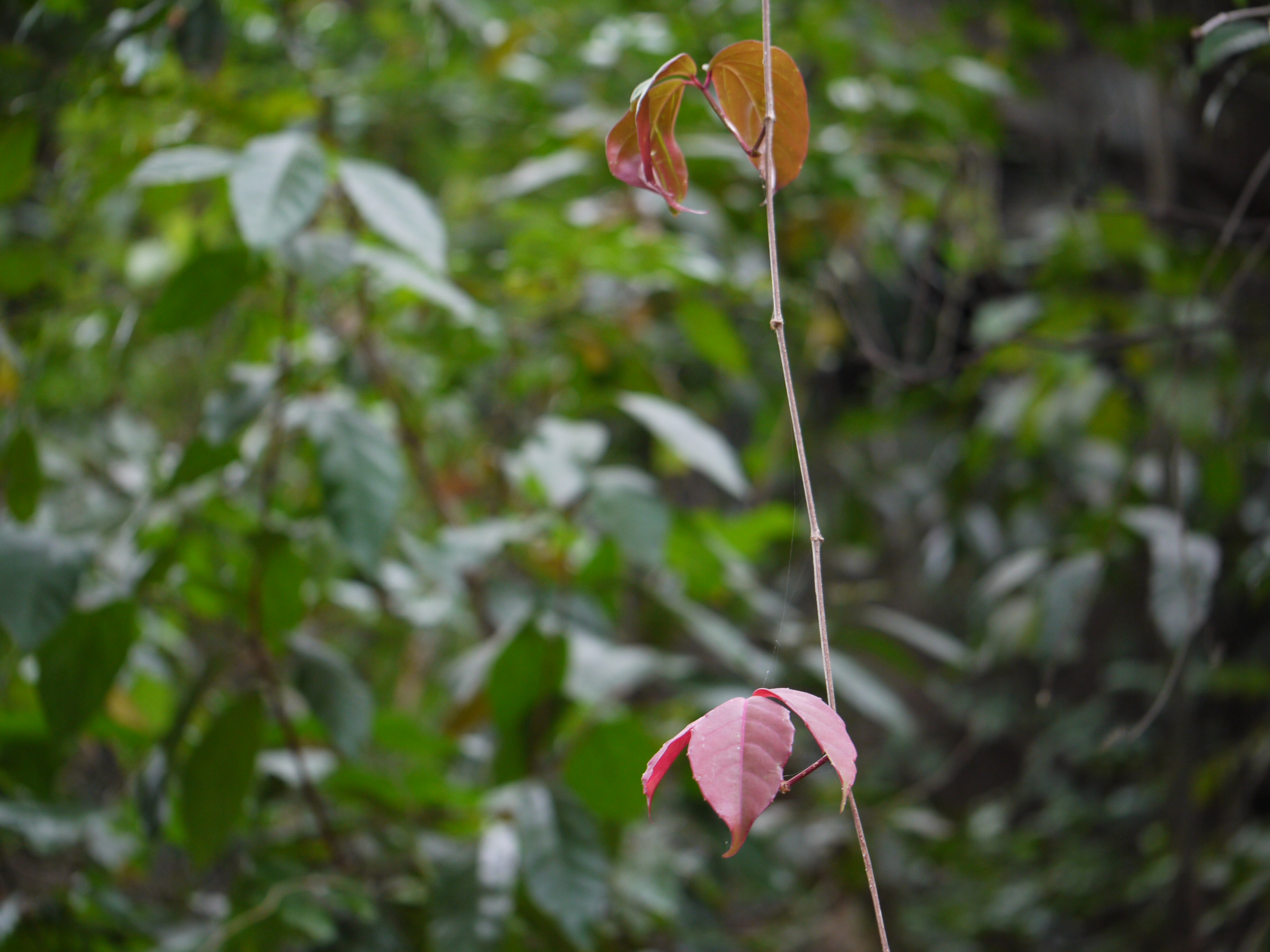
New growth

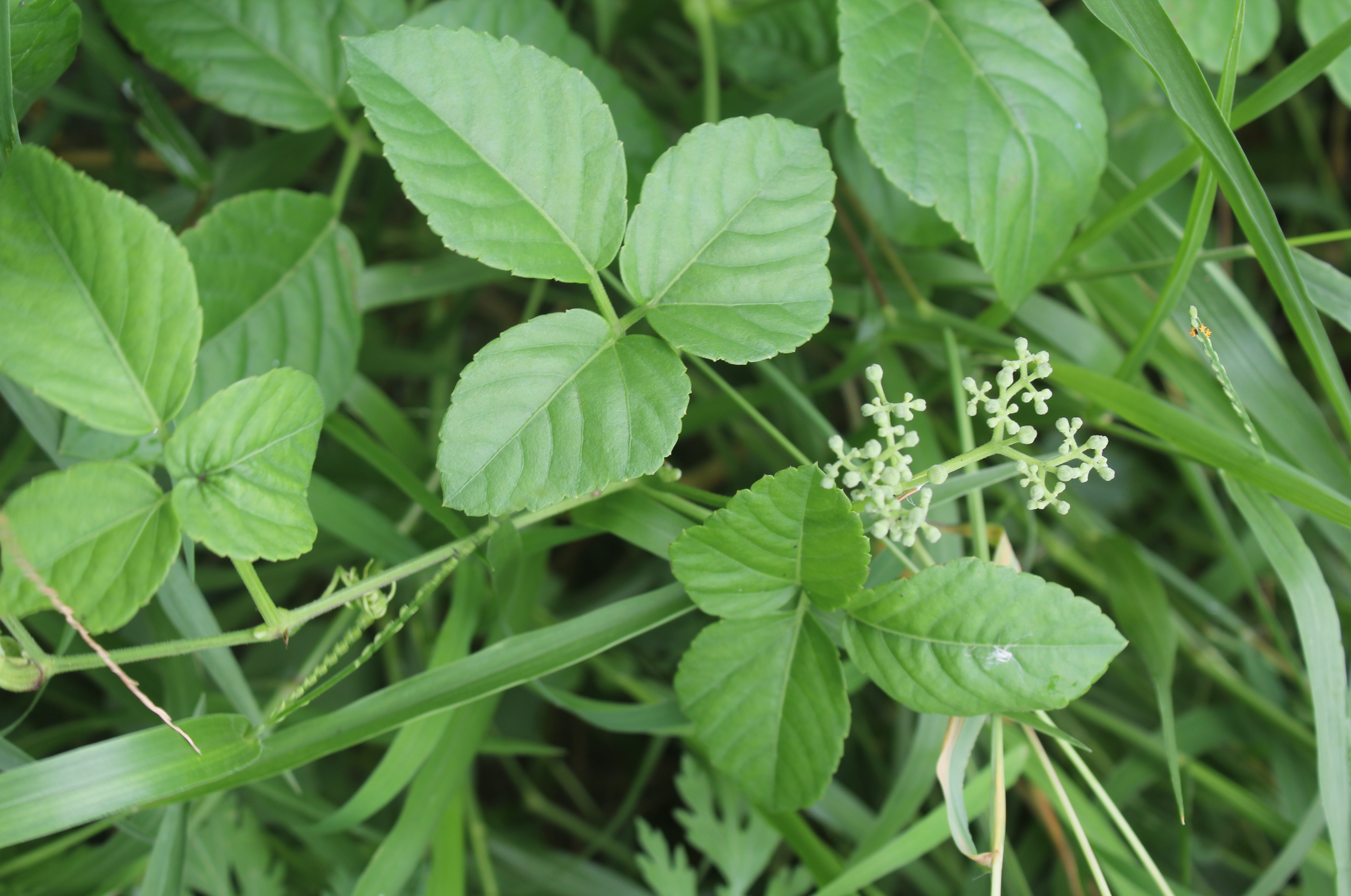
Leaves and flower buds

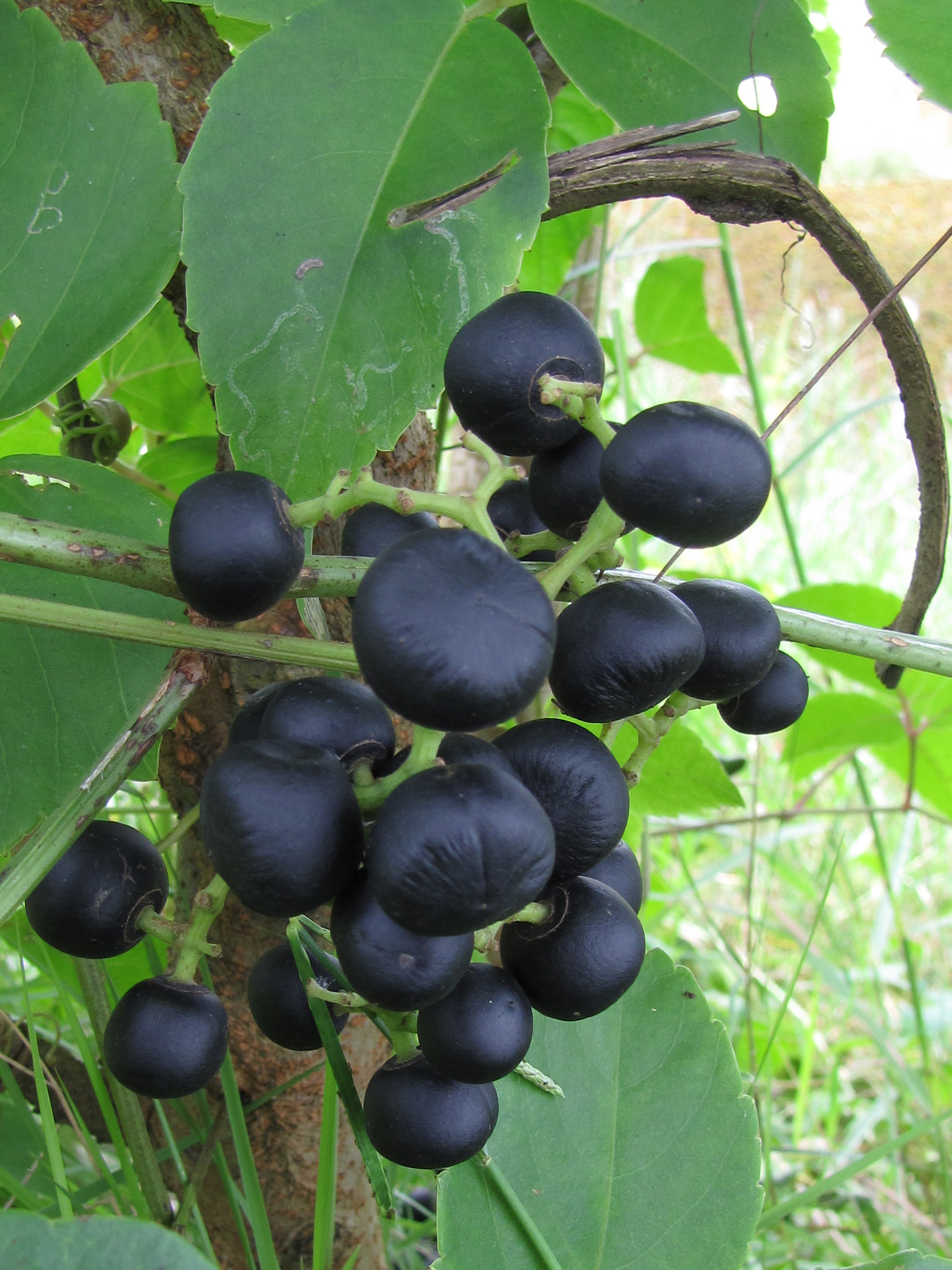
Fruit
