= Oxyptilus orichalcias =

Scientific classification
- Kingdom: Animalia
- Phylum: Arthropoda
- Class: Insecta
- Order: Lepidoptera
- Family: Pterophoridae
- Genus: Oxyptilus
- Species: O. orichalcias

Binomial name
- Oxyptilus orichalcias Meyrick, 1916

Species of plume moth

Oxyptilus orichalcias is a moth of the family Pterophoridae. It is known from Malawi.
