= Oxyptilus wallecei =

Scientific classification
- Kingdom: Animalia
- Phylum: Arthropoda
- Clade: Pancrustacea
- Class: Insecta
- Order: Lepidoptera
- Family: Pterophoridae
- Genus: Oxyptilus
- Species: O. wallecei

Binomial name
- Oxyptilus wallecei T. B. Fletcher, 1911

Species of plume moth

Oxyptilus wallecei is a moth of the family Pterophoridae. It was described by Thomas Bainbrigge Fletcher in 1911 and is found on the Aru Islands in Indonesia.
