= Oxyptilus insomnis =

Scientific classification
- Kingdom: Animalia
- Phylum: Arthropoda
- Clade: Pancrustacea
- Class: Insecta
- Order: Lepidoptera
- Family: Pterophoridae
- Genus: Oxyptilus
- Species: O. insomnis

Binomial name
- Oxyptilus insomnis (Townsend, 1956)

Synonyms
- Capperia insomnis Townsend, 1956; Procapperia insomnis (Townsend, 1956)

Species of plume moth

Oxyptilus insomnis is a moth of the family Pterophoridae. It is known from Kenya.

The larvae feed on Tinnea aethiopica.
