= Oxyptilus regulus =

Scientific classification
- Kingdom: Animalia
- Phylum: Arthropoda
- Class: Insecta
- Order: Lepidoptera
- Family: Pterophoridae
- Genus: Oxyptilus
- Species: O. regulus

Binomial name
- Oxyptilus regulus Meyrick, 1906

Species of plume moth

Oxyptilus regulus (the grape boring plume moth) is a moth of the family Pterophoridae. It is found in Australia, but has recently also been recorded from southern India.

Larvae have been recorded feeding on Vitis vinifera.
