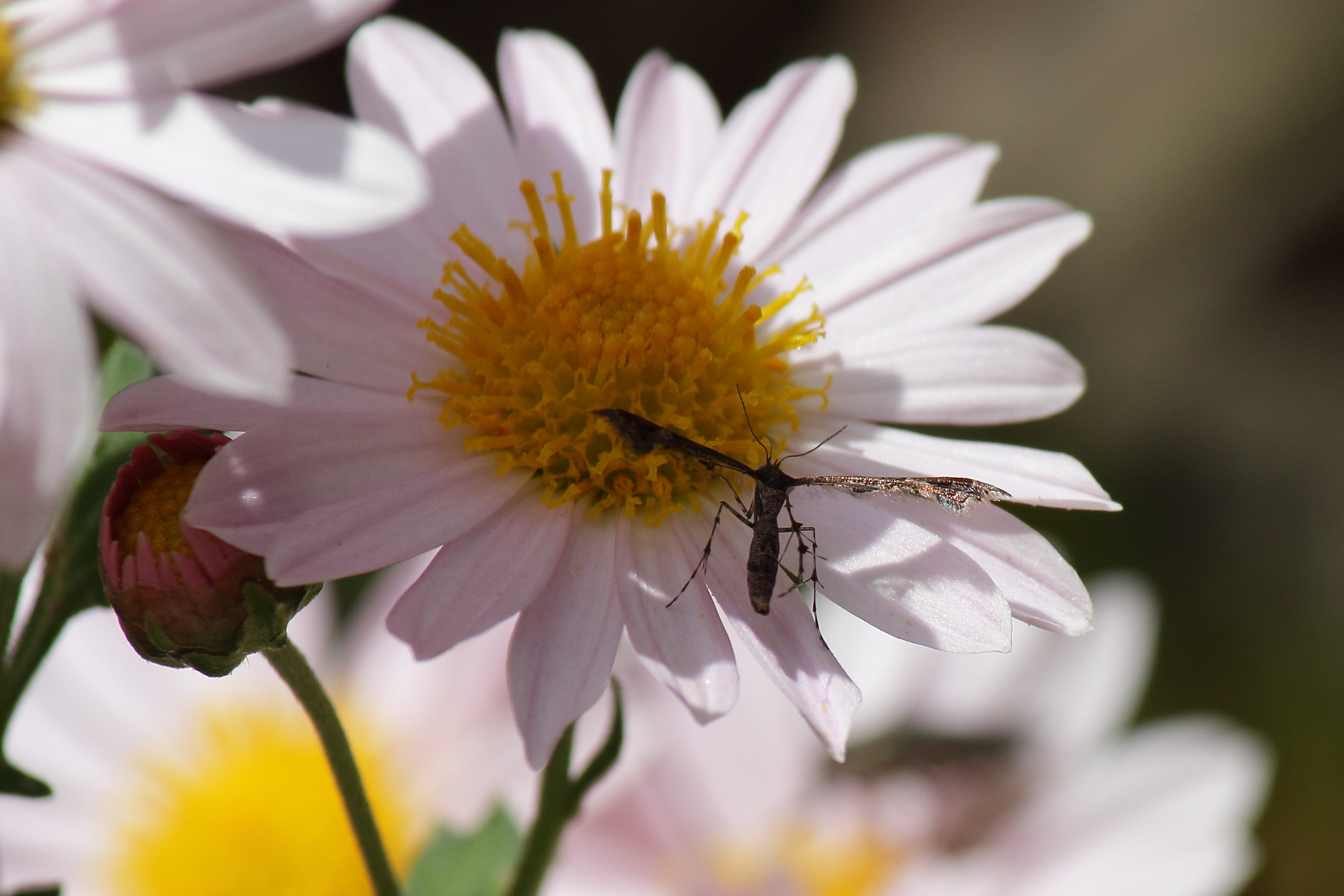

Scientific classification
- Domain: Eukaryota
- Kingdom: Animalia
- Phylum: Arthropoda
- Class: Insecta
- Order: Lepidoptera
- Family: Pterophoridae
- Genus: Nippoptilia
- Species: N. vitis

Binomial name
- Nippoptilia vitis (Sasaki, 1913)

Synonyms
- Stenoptilia vitis Sasaki, 1913; Oxyptilus formosanus Matsumura, 1931

= Nippoptilia vitis =

Species of plume moth

Nippoptilia vitis (grape plume moth) is a moth of the Pterophoridae family. It comes from Japan, Korea, Taiwan, China and Thailand.

The wingspan is about 11 millimetres (0.43 in) and the length of the forewings is 7–8 millimetres (0.28–0.31 in).

The larvae feed on Ampelopsis glandulosa, Cayratia japonica, Parthenocissus tricuspidata, Vitis thunbergii and Vitis vinifera. They feed on the flowers leaves of their host plants. When feeding on the leaf of Cayratia japonica, it eats a leaf from the under surface. The pupal period lasts for about a week.
