= Nippoptilia regulus =

Scientific classification
- Kingdom: Animalia
- Phylum: Arthropoda
- Class: Insecta
- Order: Lepidoptera
- Family: Pterophoridae
- Genus: Nippoptilia
- Species: N. regulus

Binomial name
- Nippoptilia regulus (Meyrick, 1906)

Synonyms
- Oxyptilus regulus Meyrick, 1906

Species of plume moth

Nippoptilia regulus is a moth of the family Pterophoridae first described by Edward Meyrick in 1906. It is found in Sri Lanka.
