= Oxyptilus erebites =

Scientific classification
- Kingdom: Animalia
- Phylum: Arthropoda
- Class: Insecta
- Order: Lepidoptera
- Family: Pterophoridae
- Genus: Oxyptilus
- Species: O. erebites

Binomial name
- Oxyptilus erebites Meyrick, 1937

Species of plume moth

Oxyptilus erebites is a moth of the family Pterophoridae described by Edward Meyrick in 1937. It is known from the Democratic Republic of the Congo.
