= Nippoptilia spinosa =

Scientific classification
- Domain: Eukaryota
- Kingdom: Animalia
- Phylum: Arthropoda
- Class: Insecta
- Order: Lepidoptera
- Family: Pterophoridae
- Genus: Nippoptilia
- Species: N. spinosa

Binomial name
- Nippoptilia spinosa Yano, 1963

Species of plume moth

Nippoptilia spinosa is a moth of the family Pterophoridae that is known from Papua New Guinea.

The length of the forewings is about 7.2 millimetres (0.28 in) for females and 7.5 millimetres (0.30 in) for males.
