= Oxyptilus erythrodactylus =

Scientific classification
- Kingdom: Animalia
- Phylum: Arthropoda
- Class: Insecta
- Order: Lepidoptera
- Family: Pterophoridae
- Genus: Oxyptilus
- Species: O. erythrodactylus

Binomial name
- Oxyptilus erythrodactylus T. B. Fletcher, 1911

Species of plume moth

Oxyptilus erythrodactylus is a moth of the family Pterophoridae that was described by Thomas Bainbrigge Fletcher in 1911. It is known from South Africa.
