= Nippoptilia rutteni =

Scientific classification
- Kingdom: Animalia
- Phylum: Arthropoda
- Class: Insecta
- Order: Lepidoptera
- Family: Pterophoridae
- Genus: Nippoptilia
- Species: N. rutteni

Binomial name
- Nippoptilia rutteni Gielis, 2003

Species of plume moth

Nippoptilia rutteni is a species of moth in the genus Nippoptilia, known from New Guinea. Moths in this species have a wingspan of approximately 13 millimetres (0.51 in). The specific name "rutteni" refers to microlepidopterist Dr. A.L.M. Rutten.
