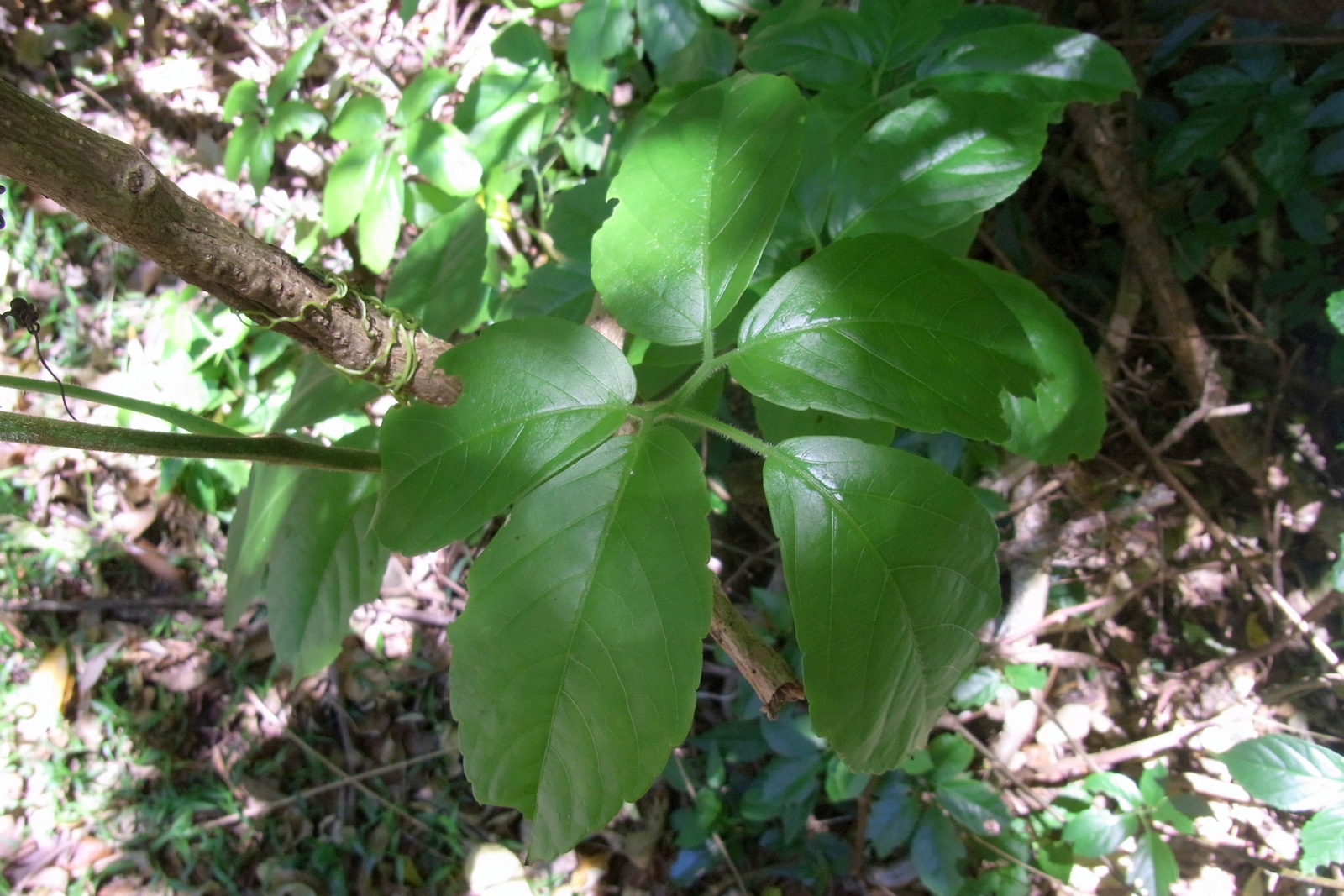
- Victoria Park Nature Reserve, Australia

Scientific classification
- Kingdom: Plantae
- Clade: Tracheophytes
- Clade: Angiosperms
- Clade: Eudicots
- Clade: Rosids
- Order: Vitales
- Family: Vitaceae
- Genus: Causonis
- Species: C. eurynema

Binomial name
- Causonis eurynema B.L.Burtt

Synonyms
- Cayratia eurynema

= Causonis eurynema =

Soft water vine

Species of grapevine

Causonis eurynema, commonly known as the soft water vine, is a plant in the grape family, found in Australia. A large woody climber usually seen in tropical forest. This plant was first collected at Comboyne in May, 1935. It was named by the eminent English botanist, Bill Burtt.
