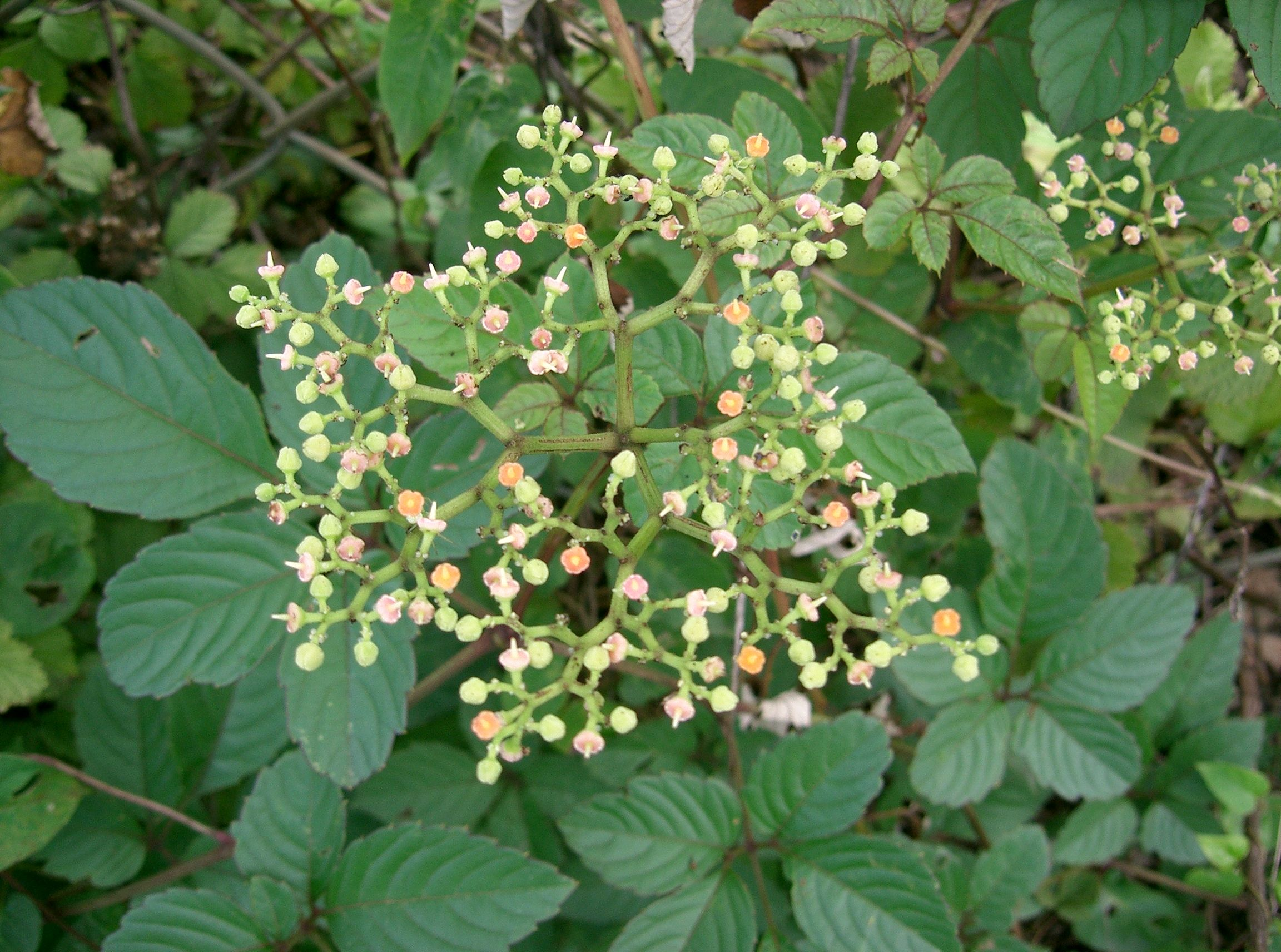
- Causonis japonica

Scientific classification
- Kingdom: Plantae
- Clade: Tracheophytes
- Clade: Angiosperms
- Clade: Eudicots
- Clade: Rosids
- Order: Vitales
- Family: Vitaceae
- Tribe: Cayratieae
- Genus: Causonis; Raf.

= Causonis =

Genus of flowering plants

Causonis is a genus of flowering plants belonging to the family Vitaceae; it is now placed in the tribe Cayratieae.

Its native range is Tropical and Subtropical Asia to Southwestern Pacific.

== Species ==
Plants of the World Online currently includes:

1. Causonis clematidea (F.Muell.) Jackes
2. Causonis corniculata (Benth.) J.Wen & L.M.Lu
3. Causonis eurynema (B.L.Burtt) Jackes
4. Causonis japonica (Thunb.) Raf. - type species
5. Causonis maritima (Jackes) Jackes
6. Causonis pterita (Merr.) J.Wen & L.M.Lu
7. Causonis trifolia (L.) Mabb. & J.Wen
