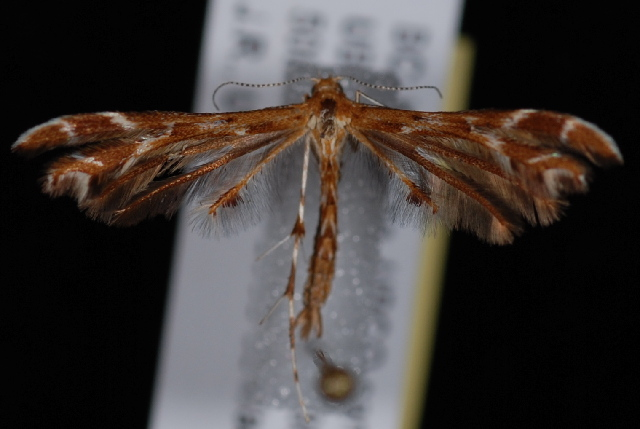

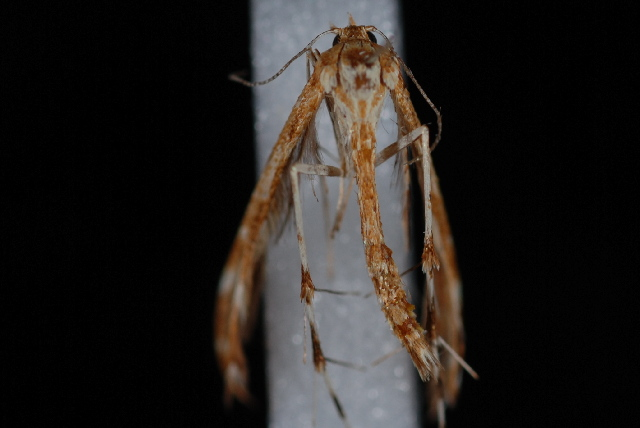

Scientific classification
- Kingdom: Animalia
- Phylum: Arthropoda
- Clade: Pancrustacea
- Class: Insecta
- Order: Lepidoptera
- Family: Pterophoridae
- Genus: Oxyptilus
- Species: O. delawaricus

Binomial name
- Oxyptilus delawaricus Zeller, 1873

Synonyms
- Oxyptilus delawarica; Oxyptilus f. finitimus Grinnell, 1908

= Oxyptilus delawaricus =

Species of plume moth

Oxyptilus delawaricus is a moth of the family Pterophoridae. It is found in North America, including Canada, New Hampshire, Massachusetts and California.

The wingspan is 17–18 millimetres (0.67–0.71 in).
