= Oxyptilus praedator =

Scientific classification
- Kingdom: Animalia
- Phylum: Arthropoda
- Class: Insecta
- Order: Lepidoptera
- Family: Pterophoridae
- Genus: Oxyptilus
- Species: O. praedator

Binomial name
- Oxyptilus praedator Meyrick, 1910

Synonyms
- Xyroptila praedator; Xyroptila predator

Species of plume moth

Oxyptilus praedator is a moth of the family Pterophoridae. It is found in Indian part of the Himalayas.

The wingspan is about 12 millimetres (0.47 in). The head and thorax are dark fuscous, but the metathorax and undersurface are white. The abdomen is dark fuscous, but white beneath, except towards the apex. The forewings are bronzy-blackish with some very undefined light suffusion towards the base of the first segment, and a faint whitish-fuscous subterminal line on both segments. The hindwings are blackish.
