= Oxyptilus idonealis =

Scientific classification
- Kingdom: Animalia
- Phylum: Arthropoda
- Class: Insecta
- Order: Lepidoptera
- Family: Pterophoridae
- Genus: Oxyptilus
- Species: O. idonealis

Binomial name
- Oxyptilus idonealis Walker, 1864

Species of plume moth

Oxyptilus idonealis is a moth of the family Pterophoridae. It is found in Indonesia on the island of Borneo.
