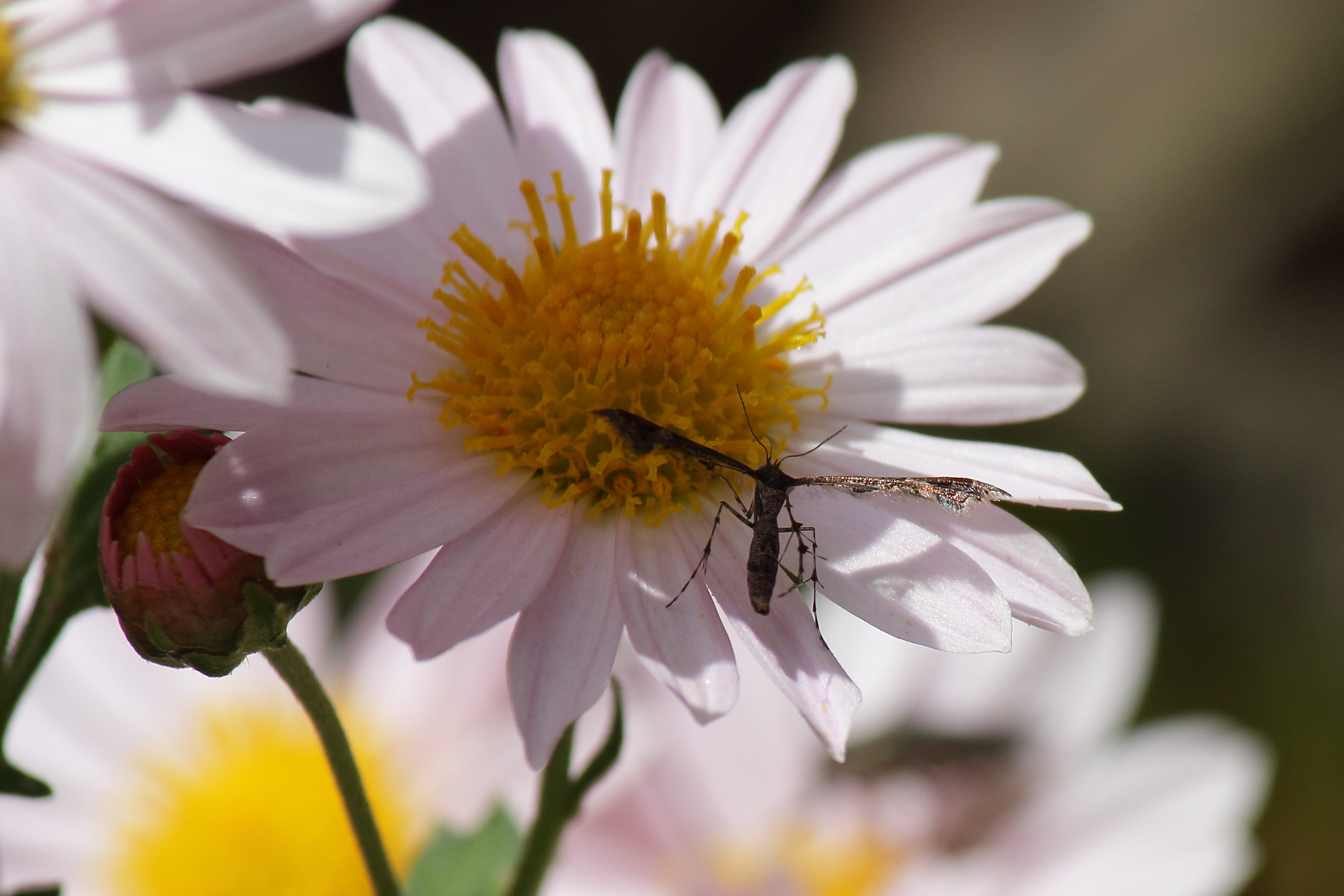
- Nippoptilia vitis

Scientific classification
- Kingdom: Animalia
- Phylum: Arthropoda
- Clade: Pancrustacea
- Class: Insecta
- Order: Lepidoptera
- Family: Pterophoridae
- Tribe: Platyptiliini
- Genus: Nippoptilia; Matsumura, 1931

= Nippoptilia =

Plume moth genus

Nippoptilia is a genus of moths in the family of Pterophoridae. The genus was first discovered by Shōnen Matsumura in 1931.

== Species ==
- Nippoptilia cinctipedalis (Walker, 1864)
- Nippoptilia distigmata S. Kim & B. K. Byun, 2010
- Nippoptilia issikii Yano, 1961
- Nippoptilia philippensis Gielis, 2003
- Nippoptilia pullum Gielis & De Vos, 2006
- Nippoptilia regulus (Meyrick, 1906)
- Nippoptilia rutteni Gielis, 2003
- Nippoptilia spinosa Yano, 1963
- Nippoptilia vitis (Sasaki, 1913)
