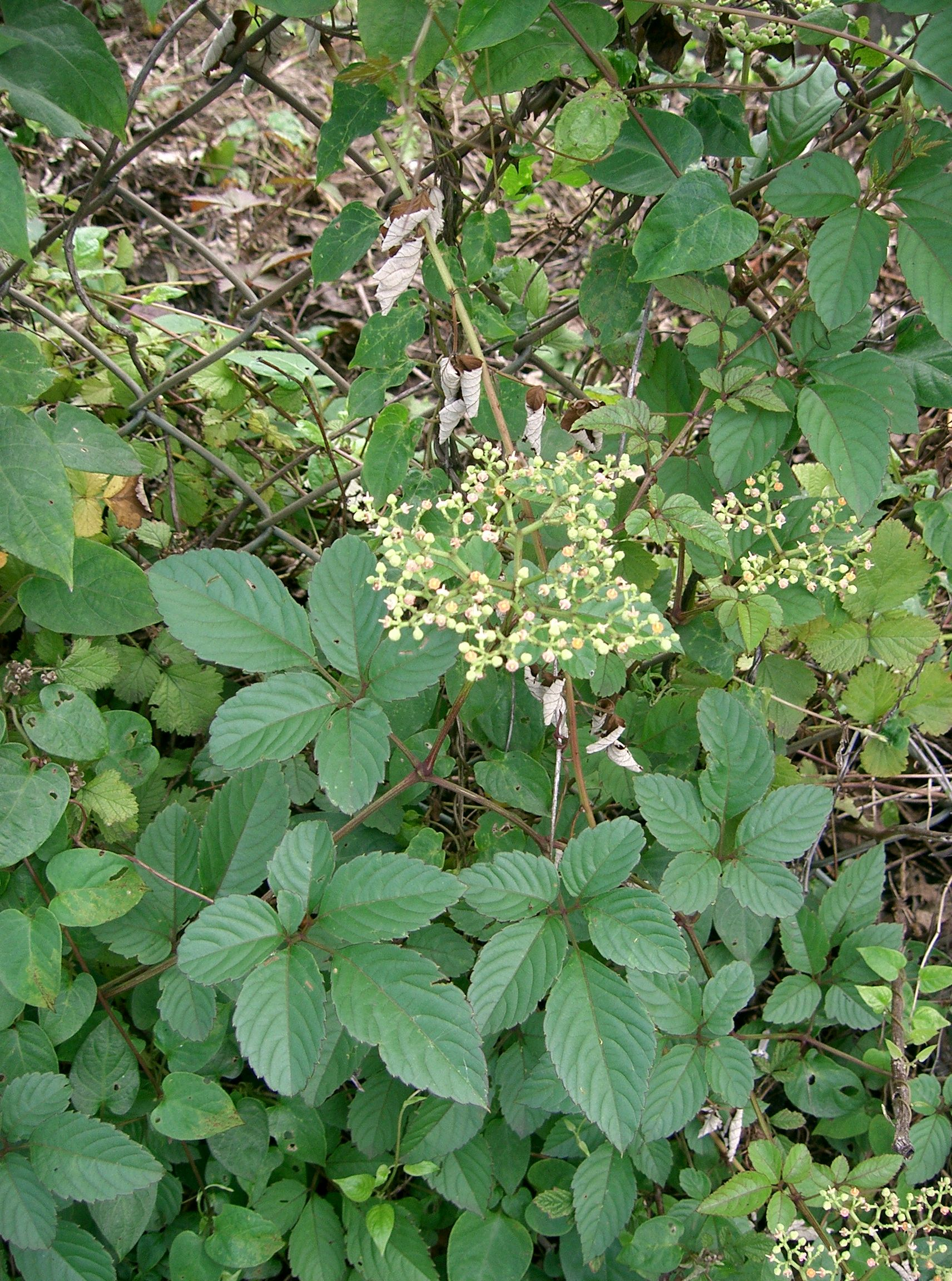

Scientific classification
- Kingdom: Plantae
- Clade: Embryophytes
- Clade: Tracheophytes
- Clade: Spermatophytes
- Clade: Angiosperms
- Clade: Eudicots
- Clade: Rosids
- Order: Vitales
- Family: Vitaceae
- Genus: Causonis
- Species: C. japonica

Binomial name
- Causonis japonica (Thunb.) Raf.

Synonyms
- List: Cayratia japonica (Thunb.) Gagnep.; Cayratia tenuifolia (Wight & Arn.) Gagnep.; Cayratia trifolia var. quinquefoliola W.T.Wang; Cissus cyanocarpa Miq.; Cissus cymosa Steud.; Cissus japonica (Thunb.) Willd.; Cissus leucocarpa Blume; Cissus paniculata B.Heyne; Cissus tenuifolia (Wight & Arn.) B.Heyne ex Planch.; Cissus truncata M.A.Lawson; Cissus vagans Carrière; Columella japonica (Thunb.) Merr.; Columella japonica Craib; Columella tenuifolia Merr.; Vitis cymosa Blume; Vitis irawadyana Steud.; Vitis japonica Thunb.; Vitis leucocarpa (Blume) Hayata; Vitis paniculata B.Heyne ex Wall.; Vitis quinquefolia Noronha; Vitis tenuifolia Wight & Arn.; Vitis truncata Wall.

= Causonis japonica =

Species of vine

Causonis japonica (also known by its synonym Cayratia japonica and common names bushkiller, yabu garashi and Japanese cayratia herb) is a vine plant in the grape family, Vitaceae. It is the type species of its genus and is native to tropical and subtropical Asia, Australia and the West Pacific. It is used as a traditional Chinese medicine to relieve swelling and heat, and to enhance diuresis and detoxification.

== Description ==
Causonis japonica is a perennial herbaceous vine with compound, alternately branching leaves. Tendrils grow opposite each leaf. The leaves have 5 leaflets with dentate margins and a white coloration on the lower surface. The leaflets are arranged in a semi-palmate arrangement with 2 pairs of 2 with 1 singular leaflet with a longer stem in the center. It flowers in the late summer with red, white, and yellow flowers developing in umbels and producing grape-like berries with 2-4 seeds. In South Korea it flowers in July and August, with its fruit ripening in September and November, while in the southern hemisphere, in the Australian Northern Territory, it flowers and fruits in October.

This species may be confused with Virginia creeper in that they both have leaves with 5 toothed leaflets, but Virginia creeper lacks a petiolule (stem connecting a leaflet to the main leaf stem) on any of the leaflets.

== Habitat ==
It is a vine which grows on the edges of rainforests.

== Taxonomy ==
As can be seen from the list of synonyms, this species has been named and renamed many times.

It was first described as Vitis japonica in 1784 by Carl Peter Thunberg from a specimen found near Nagasaki. Its current name was given in 1838 by Constantine Samuel Rafinesque, when he transferred the species to the genus Causonis.

in 1798, Carl Ludwig Willdenow transferred it to the genus Cissus, to give Cissus japonica. In 1918, Elmer Drew Merrill transferred it to the genus Columella. In 1911, François Gagnepain transferred it to the genus Cayratia, to give Cayratia japonica, a name which was accepted by Australian authorities until at least 2020, and which remains its accepted name in South Korea.

== As an introduced species in the US ==
Causonis japonica has been introduced in tropical areas of the United States including Texas, Louisiana, Mississippi, Alabama, and North Carolina, where it is known as bushkiller. It can outcompete native plants and stress native trees by blocking sunlight and weighing them down. Controlling this weed is difficult as it can regenerate from rhizomes that remain in the soil. Cutting the stems at the ground and applying a systemic herbicide will often kill the plant. Composting it is not recommended as it can re-sprout from buried stems.
