= Nippoptilia cinctipedalis =

Scientific classification
- Kingdom: Animalia
- Phylum: Arthropoda
- Class: Insecta
- Order: Lepidoptera
- Family: Pterophoridae
- Genus: Nippoptilia
- Species: N. cinctipedalis

Binomial name
- Nippoptilia cinctipedalis (Walker, 1864)

Synonyms
- Oxyptilus cinctipedalis Walker, 1864; Nippoptilia minor Hori, 1933; Stenoptilia minor; Trichoptilus eochrodes Meyrick, 1935; Nippoptilia eochrodes (Meyrick, 1935); Trichoptilus caryornis Meyrick, 1935; Oxyptilus caryornis (Meyrick, 1935)

Species of plume moth

Nippoptilia cinctipedalis is a moth of the family Pterophoridae. It is found in Australia, Korea, Japan (Kyushu), China, Micronesia, the Republic of Palau and Vietnam.

The wingspan is 8–9 millimetres (0.31–0.35 in) and the length of the forewings is 5–6 millimetres (0.20–0.24 in). Adults emerge in September and October in Japan.
