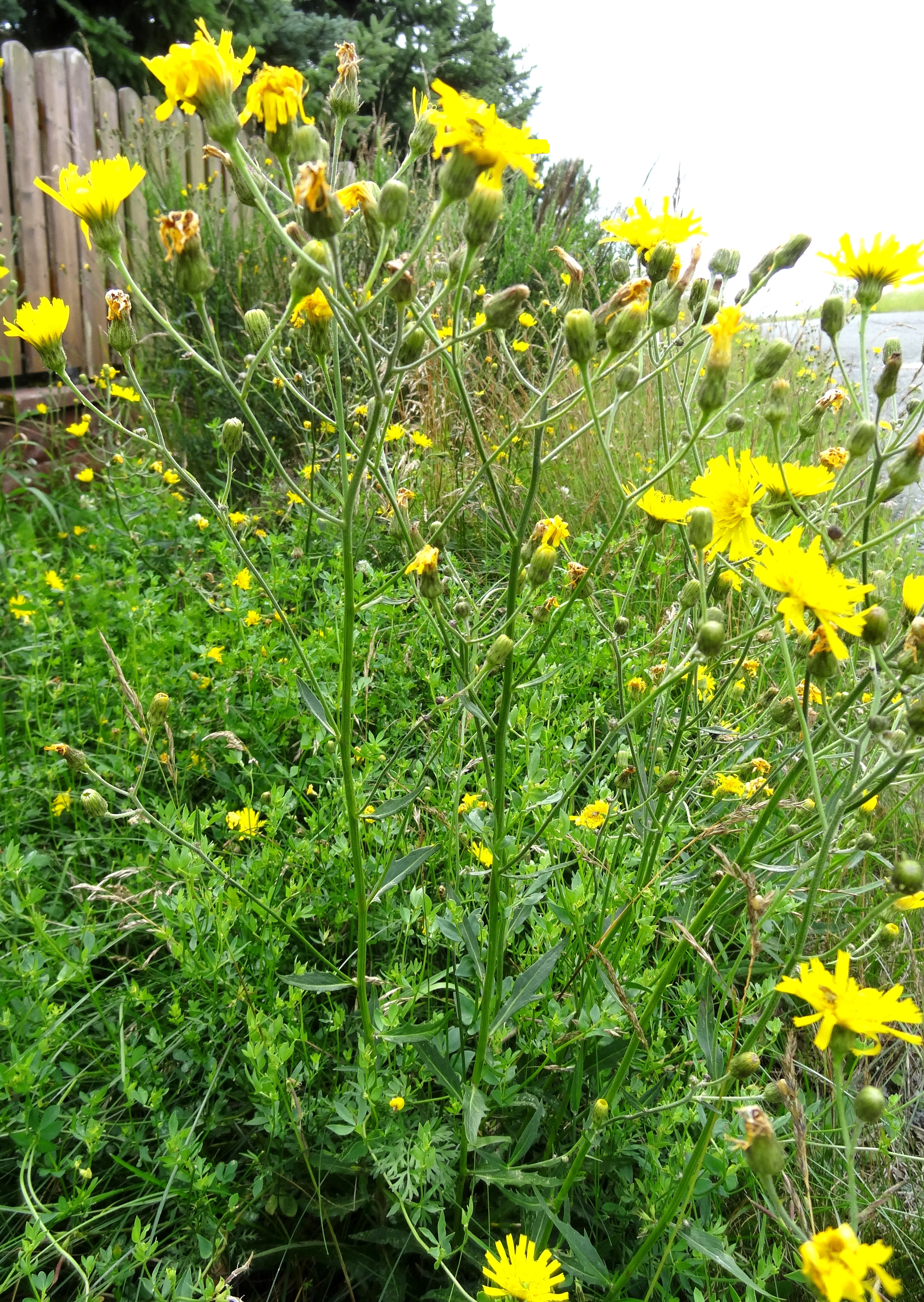

Scientific classification
- Kingdom: Plantae
- Clade: Tracheophytes
- Clade: Angiosperms
- Clade: Eudicots
- Clade: Asterids
- Order: Asterales
- Family: Asteraceae
- Genus: Hieracium
- Species: H. laevigatum

Binomial name
- Hieracium laevigatum Willd. 1803

Synonyms
- Synonymy: Hieracium achalzichiense Üksip; Hieracium acrifolium (Dahlst.) Johanss.; Hieracium analogum Boreau; Hieracium auriglandulum Wiinst.; Hieracium boreanum Boreau; Hieracium calothyrsum Zahn ex Murr; Hieracium chaubardianum Arv.-Touv.; Hieracium dechyi (Koslovsky & Zahn) Üksip; Hieracium deltophylloides (Zahn) Prain; Hieracium deseglisei] Boreau; Hieracium dryadeum Boreau; Hieracium echinodermum (Zahn) Prain; Hieracium fagineum Arv.-Touv.; Hieracium ficifolium Arv.-Touv.; Hieracium flocciparum (Schelk. & Zahn) Üksip; Hieracium creperiforme Üksip; Hieracium godbyense (Norrl.) Norrl.; Hieracium hoglandicum Brenner; Hieracium mixopolium Dahlst.; Hieracium goriense (Koslovsky & Zahn) Üksip; Hieracium gothiciforme (Dahlst.) Dahlst.; Hieracium gothicum Fr.; Hieracium lancidens Prain; Hieracium hypopityforme Üksip; Hieracium knafii (Čelak.) Zahn; Hieracium laevigans (Zahn) Üksip; Hieracium leucothyrsum (Litv. & Zahn) Üksip; Hieracium lineatum Dahlst.; Hieracium lissolepium (Zahn) Üksip; Hieracium longissimum Peter; Hieracium macrolygodes (Zahn) Üksip; Hieracium magistri Godr.; Hieracium nivale Froel.; Hieracium perangustum (Dahlst.) Prain; Hieracium pesianum Arv.-Touv. & Belli; Hieracium pictaviense Sauzé & Maillard; Hieracium pseudogothicum Arv.-Touv.; Hieracium retardatum (Zahn) Prain; Hieracium revolii Sudre; Hieracium rigidum Hartm.; Hieracium sagotii Boreau; Hieracium semiglobosum Dahlst.; Hieracium stricticaule Boreau; Hieracium gracilipes (Sudre) A.W.Hill; Hieracium subgracilipes (Zahn) P.D.Sell & C.West; Hieracium tridentaticeps (Zahn) Üksip; Hieracium conspicuum Boreau; Hieracium tridentatum (Fr.) Fr.; Hieracium vendeanum Boreau

= Hieracium laevigatum =

Species of flowering plant

Hieracium laevigatum, or smooth hawkweed, is a Eurasian plant species in the tribe Cichorieae within the family Asteraceae. It is widespread across much of Europe and western Asia. It is very similar to Hieracium sabaudum and can be found on dry, more or less nutrient rich soil in light woods, grassy embankments and fields, or on walls.

Hieracium laevigatum is an herb up to 60 cm (2 feet) tall, with leaves on the stem rather than in a rosette at the bottom. Leaves are lance-shaped, up to 10 cm (4 inches) long, with large teeth along the edge. One stalk branches toward the top, producing numerous flower heads. Each head has several ray flowers but no disc flowers.

Subspecies

- Hieracium laevigatum subsp. achalzichiense (Üksip) Greuter
- Hieracium laevigatum subsp. acrifolium (Dahlst.) Zahn
- Hieracium laevigatum subsp. analogum (Boreau) Zahn
- Hieracium laevigatum subsp. auriglandulum (Wiinst.) Zahn
- Hieracium laevigatum subsp. boreanum (Boreau) Zahn
- Hieracium laevigatum subsp. calothyrsum (Murr) Dalla Torre & Sarnth.
- Hieracium laevigatum subsp. chaubardianum (Arv.-Touv.) Zahn
- Hieracium laevigatum subsp. coronopifolioides Zahn
- Hieracium laevigatum subsp. dechyi Koslovsky & Zahn
- Hieracium laevigatum subsp. deltophylloides Zahn
- Hieracium laevigatum subsp. deseglisei (Boreau) Zahn
- Hieracium laevigatum subsp. dryadeum (Boreau) Zahn
- Hieracium laevigatum subsp. echinodermum Zahn
- Hieracium laevigatum subsp. fagineum (Arv.-Touv.) Zahn
- Hieracium laevigatum subsp. ficifolium (Arv.-Touv.) Zahn
- Hieracium laevigatum subsp. flocciparum Schelk. & Zahn
- Hieracium laevigatum subsp. glareosum (Lönnr.) Greuter
- Hieracium laevigatum subsp. goriense Koslovsky & Zahn
- Hieracium laevigatum subsp. gothiciforme (Dahlst.) Zahn
- Hieracium laevigatum subsp. gothicum (Fr.) Čelak.
- Hieracium laevigatum subsp. grandidens Zahn
- Hieracium laevigatum subsp. hypopityforme (Üksip) Greuter
- Hieracium laevigatum subsp. knafii (Čelak.) Zahn
- Hieracium laevigatum subsp. laevigans Zahn
- Hieracium laevigatum subsp. leucothyrsum (Litv. & Zahn) Greuter
- Hieracium laevigatum subsp. lineatum (Dahlst.) Zahn
- Hieracium laevigatum subsp. macrolygodes Zahn
- Hieracium laevigatum subsp. magistri (Godr.) Zahn
- Hieracium laevigatum subsp. nivale (Froel.) Zahn
- Hieracium laevigatum subsp. perangustum (Dahlst.) Zahn
- Hieracium laevigatum subsp. pesianum (Arv.-Touv. & Belli) Zahn
- Hieracium laevigatum subsp. pictaviense (Sauzé & Maillard) Zahn
- Hieracium laevigatum subsp. pseudogothicum (Arv.-Touv.) Zahn
- Hieracium laevigatum subsp. retardatum Zahn
- Hieracium laevigatum subsp. revolii (Sudre) Zahn
- Hieracium laevigatum subsp. rigidum (Hartm.) Čelak.
- Hieracium laevigatum subsp. sagotii (Boreau) Zahn
- Hieracium laevigatum subsp. semiglobosum (Dahlst.) Zahn
- Hieracium laevigatum subsp. stricticaule (Boreau) Zahn
- Hieracium laevigatum subsp. subgracilipes Zahn
- Hieracium laevigatum subsp. tridentaticeps (Zahn) Zahn
- Hieracium laevigatum subsp. tridentatum (Fr.) Čelak.
- Hieracium laevigatum subsp. vendeanum (Boreau) Zahn
- Hieracium laevigatum subsp. vogesicola Zahn
