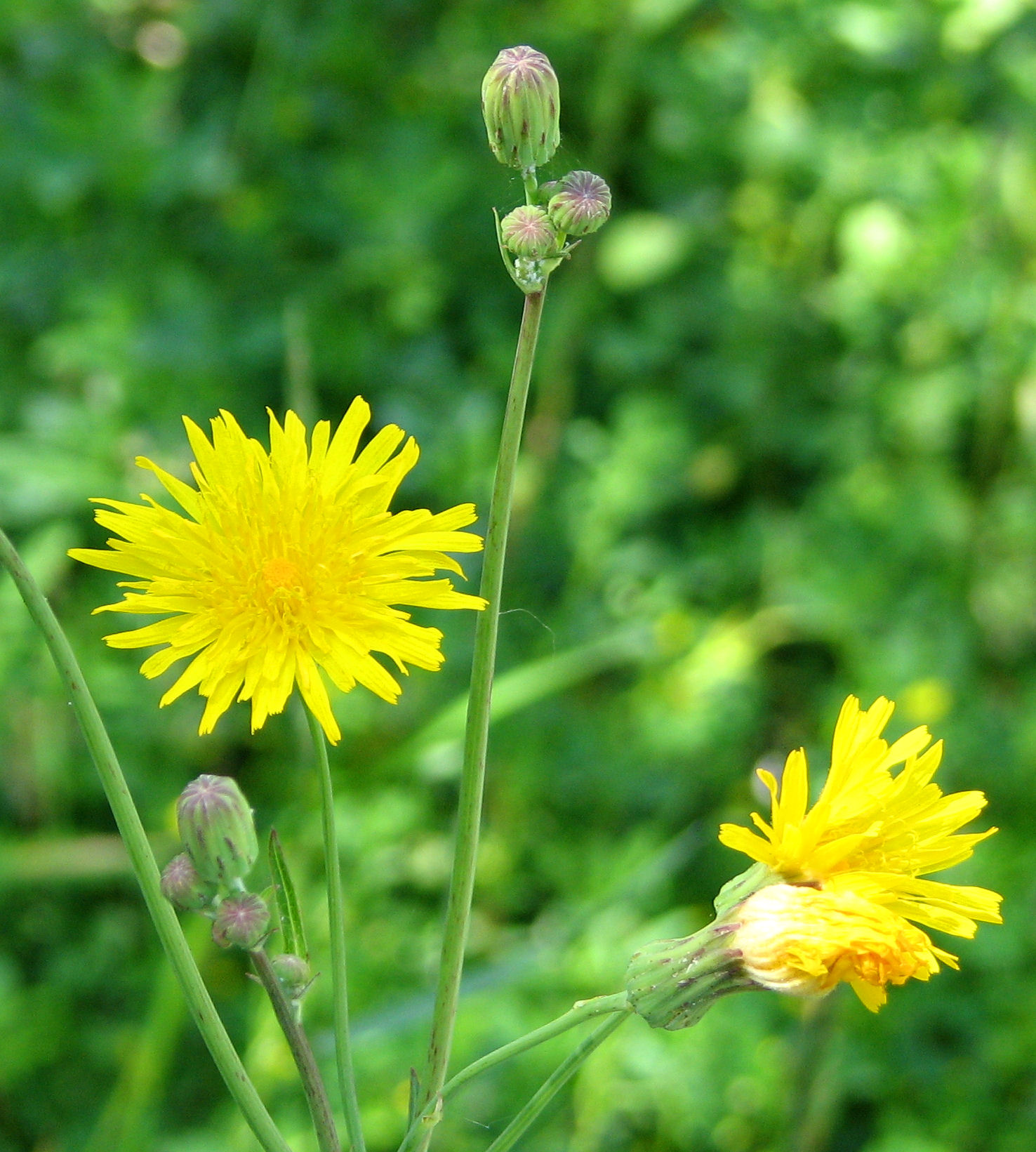

Scientific classification
- Kingdom: Plantae
- Clade: Tracheophytes
- Clade: Angiosperms
- Clade: Eudicots
- Clade: Asterids
- Order: Asterales
- Family: Asteraceae
- Genus: Hieracium
- Species: H. umbellatum

Binomial name
- Hieracium umbellatum L.
- Global country-level distribution

Synonyms
- Hieracium vulgatum; Hieracium kalmii L.; Hieracium umbellatum L.; Hieracium scabriusculum Schwein.; Hieracium acranthophorum Omang; Hieracium columbianum Rydb.; Hieracium devoldii Omang; Hieracium x dutillyanum Lepage; Hieracium eugenii Omang; Hieracium fasciculatum Pursh; Hieracium macrophyllum Pursh; Hieracium manitobense Gand.; Hieracium musartutense Omang; Hieracium nepiocratum Omang; Hieracium oxoacrum Gand.; Hieracium prenanthoides Hook., non Vill.; Hieracium rigorosum (Laest.) Almq.; Hieracium sinense Vaniot; Hieracium stiptocaule Omang; Hieracium lactescens Rouy; Hieracium dunale; Hieracium hispidum Forssk.; Hieracium monticola Jord.; Hieracium pervagum Boreau

= Hieracium umbellatum =

Species of flowering plant

Hieracium umbellatum (commonly called Hieracium canadense), the Canadian hawkweed, Canada hawkweed, narrowleaf hawkweed, or northern hawkweed, is a flowering plant in the family Asteraceae.

== Distribution ==
It is native to most of the temperate parts of the Northern Hemisphere.

Range of Hieracium canadense throughout Asia

Range of Hieracium canadense throughout Europe

Range of Hieracium canadense throughout North America

== Description ==
Its pointed leaves have toothed margins, where the teeth can appear almost hooked. The flowers of the plant are yellow.

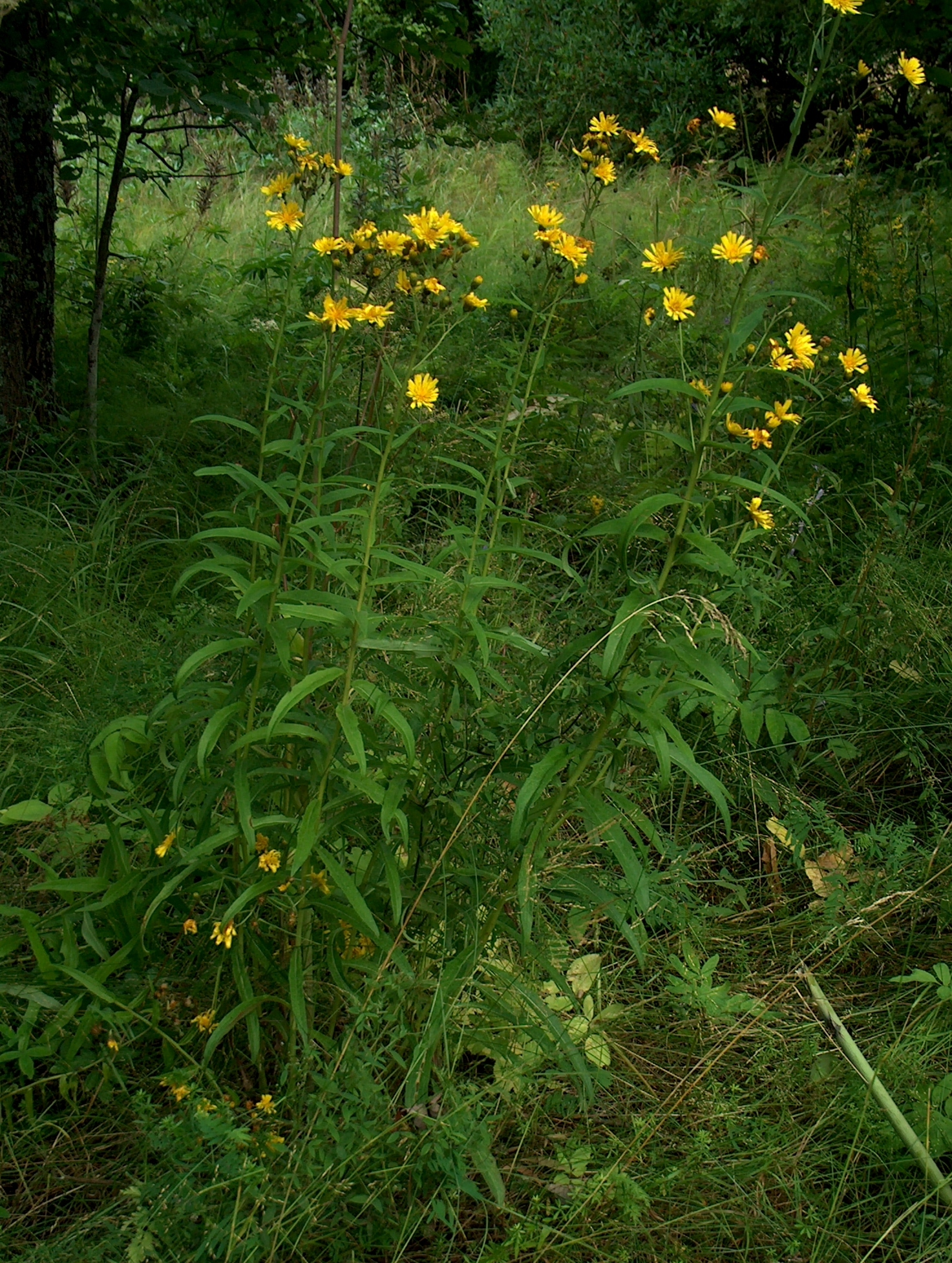
Mature plant

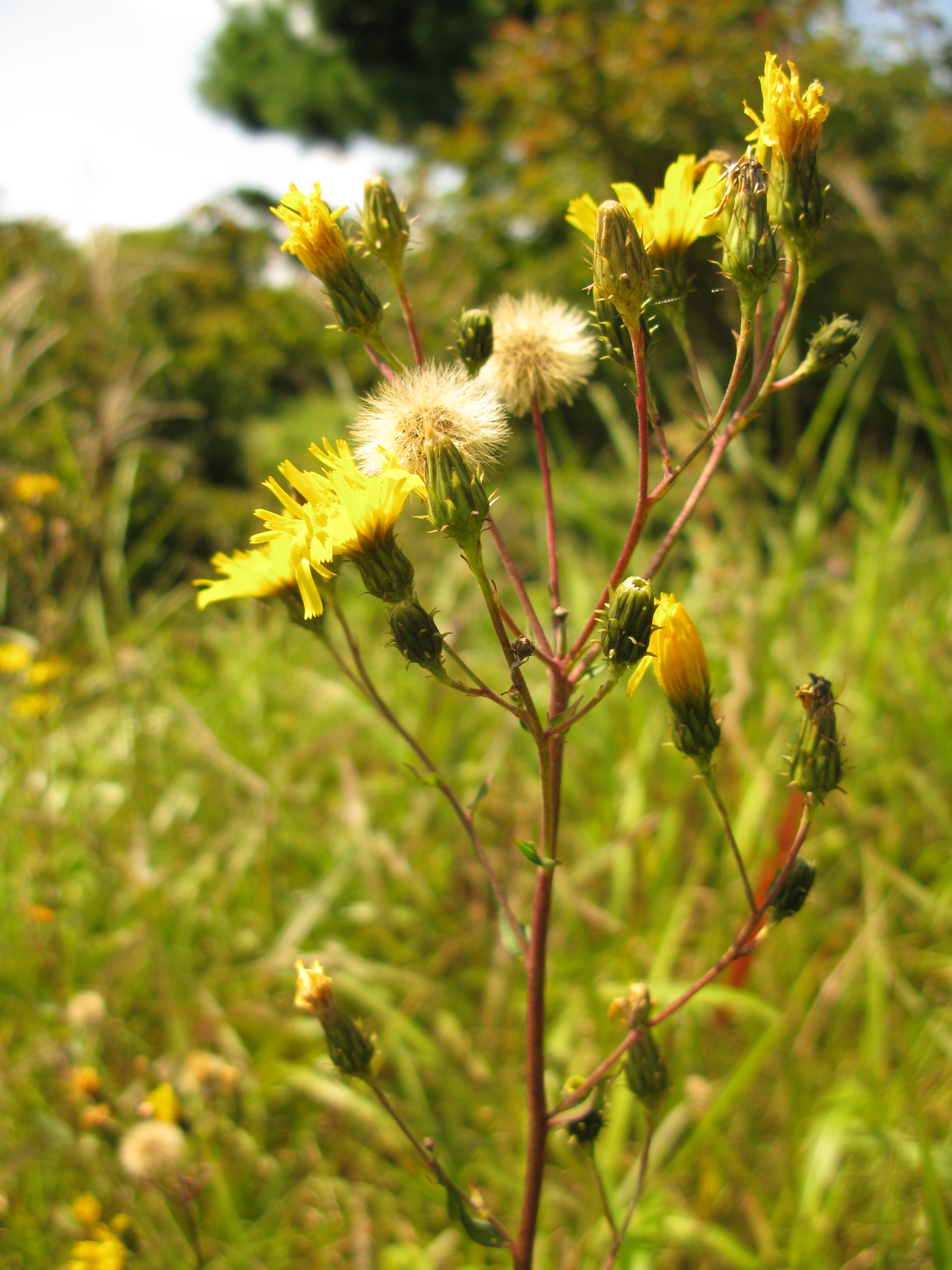
Budding, flowering, and fruiting

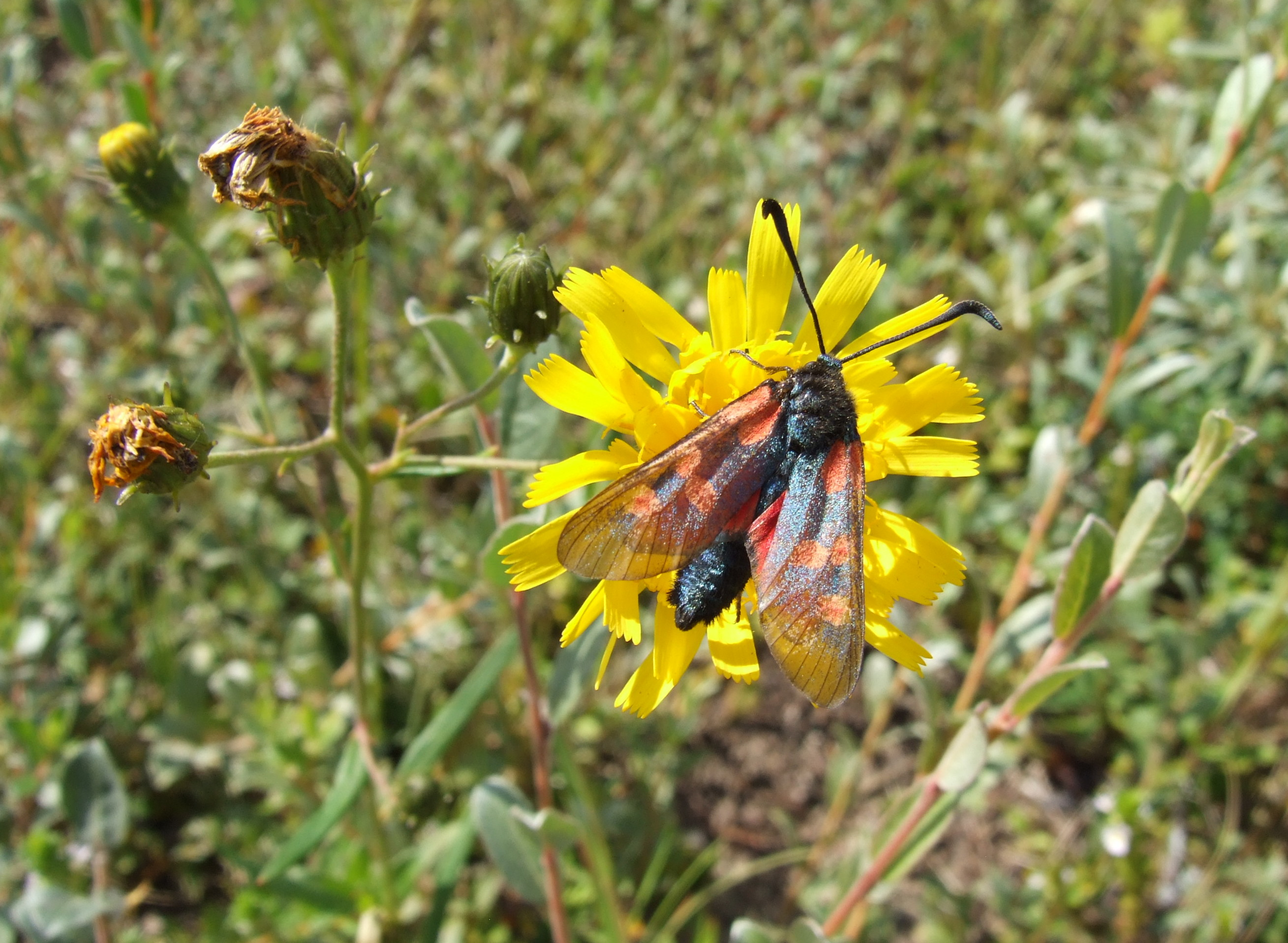
Zygaena moth visiting the flower

== Infraspecific synonyms ==
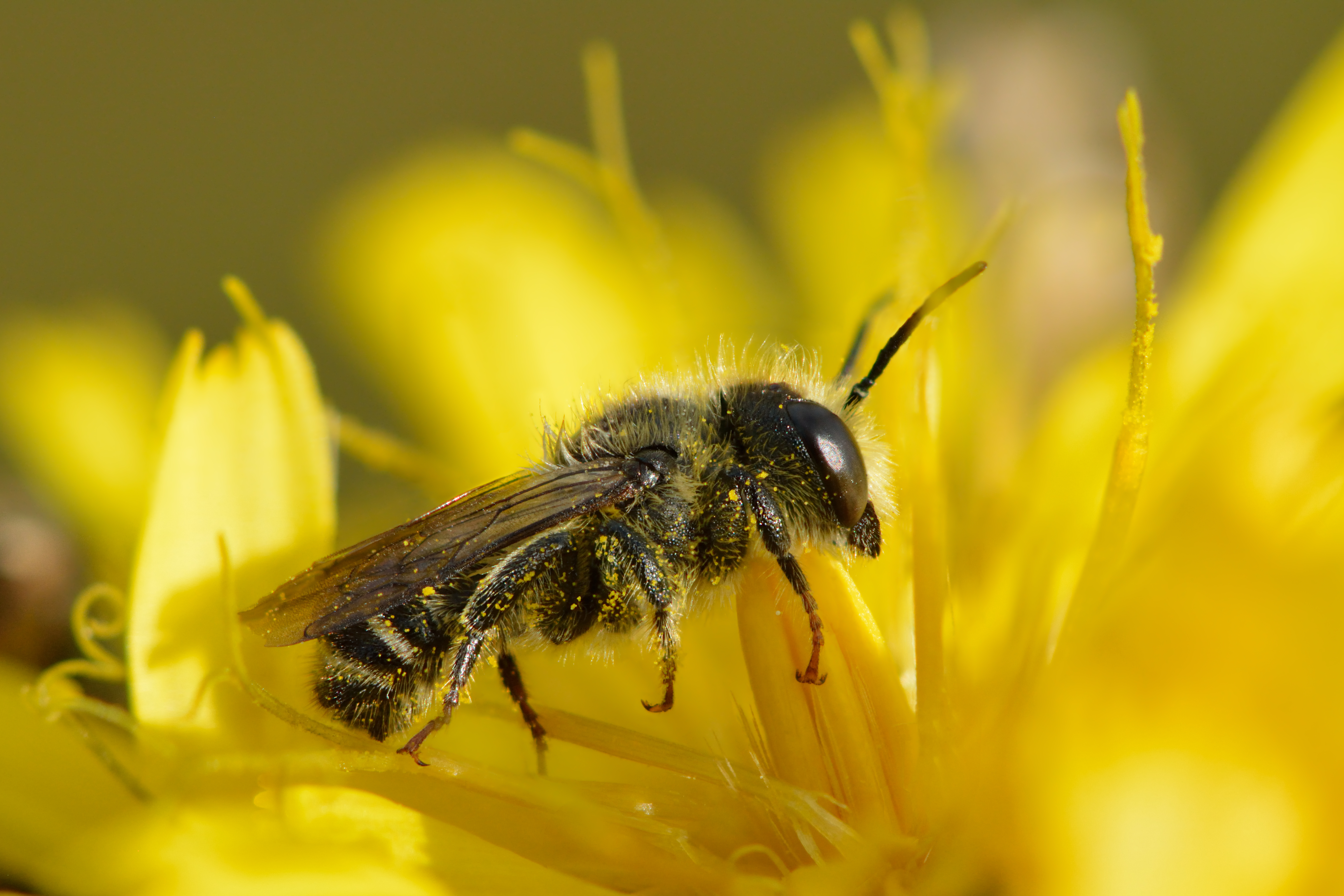
Male leafcutter bee on the flower

There are many named infraspecific taxa of Hieracium umbellatum:

- Hieracium canadense Michx. forma lepagei Vict.
- Hieracium canadense Michx. forma pilosius Lepage
- Hieracium canadense Michx. forma rufescens Lepage
- Hieracium canadense Michx. var. angustifolium Torr. & A.Gray p.p.
- Hieracium canadense Michx. var. columbianum (Rydb.) H. St.John
- Hieracium canadense Michx. var. divaricatum Lepage
- Hieracium canadense Michx. var. fasciculatum (Pursh) Fernald
- Hieracium canadense Michx. var. hirtirameum Fernald
- Hieracium canadense Michx. var. kalmii (L.) Scoggan
- Hieracium canadense Michx. var. latifolium Torr. & A.Gray
- Hieracium canadense Michx. var. scabrum Schwein.
- Hieracium canadense Michx. var. subintegrum Lepage
- Hieracium kalmii L. var. canadense (Michx.) Reveal
- Hieracium kalmii L. var. fasciculatum (Pursh) Lepage
- Hieracium kalmii L. var. subintegrum (Lepage) Lepage
- Hieracium scabriusculum Schwein. forma chrysostylum Lepage
- Hieracium scabriusculum Schwein. forma phaeostylum Lepage
- Hieracium scabriusculum Schwein. forma xanthostylum Lepage
- Hieracium scabriusculum Schwein. var. columbianum (Rydb.) Lepage
- Hieracium scabriusculum Schwein. var. perhirsutum Lepage
- Hieracium scabriusculum Schwein. var. saximontanum Lepage
- Hieracium scabriusculum Schwein. var. scabrum (Schwein.) Lepage
- Hieracium subnudum L. var. canadense (Michx.)(Michx.) DC.
- Hieracium sylvaticum Salisb., nom. illeg. hom., non (L.) L.
- Hieracium umbellatum L. subsp. canadense (Michx.) Guppy
- Hieracium umbellatum L. subsp. scabriusculum (Schwein.) Á. & D. Löve
- Hieracium umbellatum L. var. canadense (Michx.) Breitung
- Hieracium umbellatum L. var. commune Fr.
- Hieracium umbellatum L. var. coronopifolium Bernh. ex Kom.
- Hieracium umbellatum L. var. mongolicum Fr.
- Hieracium umbellatum L. var. scabriusculum (Schwein.) Farw.
- Hieracium laevigatum subsp. canadense (Michx.) Zahn
- Hieracium umbellatum L. var. canadense (Michx.) Breitung
- Hieracium canadense Michx. var. canadense
- Hieracium canadense Michx. var. fasciculatum (Pursh) Fernald
- Hieracium scabriusculum Schwein. var. columbianum (Rydb.) Lepage
- Hieracium umbellatum subsp. monticola (Jord.) Nyman
