= List of endemic plants of Corsica =

Corsica is a large island in the Mediterranean Sea, and is home to dozens of endemic species and subspecies of plants. Although it is politically part of France, the World Geographical Scheme for Recording Plant Distributions treats Corsica as distinct botanical country.

Plants are listed alphabetically by plant family. Extinct and presumed extinct species are indicated with †.

== Amaryllidaceae ==
- Acis longifolia J.Gay ex M.Roem.
- Allium corsicum Jauzein, J.-M.Tison, Deschâtres & H.Couderc

== Apiaceae ==
- Bupleurum falcatum subsp. corsicum (Coss. & Kralik) Rouy & E.G.Camus
- Daucus carota subsp. caporientalis Reduron
- Daucus carota subsp. corsoccidentalis Reduron
- Daucus carota var. meriensis Reduron
- Daucus carota subsp. otaportensis Reduron
- Daucus carota subsp. valeriae Reduron
- Laserpitium halleri subsp. cynapiifolium (Viv. ex DC.) P.Fourn.
- Mutellina corsica (J.Gay) Reduron
  - Mutellina corsica var. corsica
  - Mutellina corsica var. mufraricciae (Gamisans) Reduron
- Pastinaca kochii subsp. latifolia (Duby) Reduron
- Seseli djianeae Gamisans
- Seseli praecox (Gamisans) Gamisans

== Aspleniaceae ==
- Asplenium × dutartrei Berthet (A. ceterach × A. sagittatum) – southern Corsica

== Asteraceae ==
- Adenostyles briquetii Gamisans
- Anthemis arvensis subsp. glabra (Rouy) Jeanm.
- Bellis bernardi Boiss. & Reut.
- Bellium nivale Req.
- Carduus × theriotii nothosubsp. cyrneus (Schlüssel & Jeanm.) Lambinon, Jeanm. & Schlüssel
- Castroviejoa frigida (Labill.) Galbany, L.Sáez & Benedí
- Doronicum corsicum (Loisel.) Poir.
- Erigeron paolii Gamisans
- Hieracium bernardi subsp. bernardi
- Hieracium glaucinum subsp. dasyadenium (Zahn) de Retz & Lambinon
- Hieracium hypochoeroides subsp. ayliesii (Zahn) Greuter
- Hieracium hypochoeroides subsp. jacquiniiforme (Litard. & Zahn) Greuter
- Hieracium hypochoeroides subsp. terrei (de Retz) Greuter
- Hieracium hypochoeroides subsp. uazzanum (Zahn) Greuter
- Hieracium onosmoides subsp. microglossoides Zahn
- Hieracium racemosum subsp. insulare Greuter
- Hieracium racemosum subsp. pyramoides Zahn
- Hieracium racemosum subsp. vizzavonae Zahn
- Hieracium runcinatolobatum (Zahn) J.-M.Tison
- Hieracium rupicola subsp. marsillyanum (Arv.-Touv.) Greuter
- Hieracium saxifragum subsp. venustum (Arv.-Touv.) Zahn
- Hieracium schmidtii subsp. floccozum (Zahn) Jeanm.
- Hieracium schmidtii subsp. rupicolifolium (Zahn) Greuter
- Hieracium symphytaceum subsp. pseudorotgesianum Litard. & Zahn
- Hieracium symphytaceum subsp. rotgesianum (Arv.-Touv. & Gaut.) Zahn
- Hieracium vasconicum subsp. lactescens (Rouy) Greuter
- Hieracium venustum Arv.-Touv.
- Hieracium viscosum subsp. scariolifolium (Arv.-Touv.) Zahn
- Leucanthemopsis alpina subsp. tomentosa (Loisel.) Heywood
- Leucanthemum corsicum (Sieber ex Less.) DC.
  - Leucanthemum corsicum var. corsicum
  - Leucanthemum corsicum var. eschenlohrianum (Gamisans) Vogt, Hugot & Oberpr.
  - Leucanthemum corsicum var. fenzlii (Gamisans) Vogt, Hugot & Oberpr.
  - Leucanthemum corsicum var. pinnatifidum (Fenzl) Briq. & Cavill
- Phagnalon sordidum var. corsicum (Rouy) Gamisans
- Pilosella × deschatresii J.-M.Tison (P. lactucella subsp. nana × P. officinarum)
- Pilosella × dutartrei J.-M.Tison ( P. lactucella subsp. nana × P. visianii)
- Senecio rosinae Gamisans
- Senecio serpentinicola Jeanm.
- Taraxacum aemulans Štěpánek & Kirschner
- Taraxacum atrolivaceum Štěpánek & Kirschner
- Taraxacum atrosquamatum Soest
- Taraxacum castaneum Soest
- Taraxacum cognoscibile Štěpánek & Kirschner
- Taraxacum corsicum Soest
- Taraxacum cucullatiforme Soest
- Taraxacum gamisansii Soest
- Taraxacum marchionii Soest
- Taraxacum pomposum Štěpánek & Kirschner
- Taraxacum purpureocornutum Soest
- Taraxacum renosense Soest
- Taraxacum rubricatum Štěpánek & Kirschner
- Taraxacum squamulosum Soest

== Betulaceae ==
- Alnus alnobetula subsp. suaveolens (Req.) Lambinon & Kerguélen
- Alnus cordata subsp. cordata – northeastern Corsica

== Boraginaceae ==
- Anchusa crispa subsp. valincoana Paradis, C.Piazza & Quilichini – southwestern Corsica
- Cerinthe tenuiflora Bertol.
- Echium montenielluense Delage
- Myosotis corsicana (Fiori) Grau
- Myosotis soleirolii Godr.

== Brassicaceae ==
- Biscutella rotgesii Foucaud
- Draba × lattinicciae Gamisans
- Draba loiseleurii Boiss.
- Odontarrhena robertiana (Bernard ex Gren. & Godr.) Španiel, Al-Shehbaz, D.A.German & Marhold

== Campanulaceae ==
- Phyteuma serratum Viv.

== Caprifolicaceae ==
- Scabiosa corsica (Litard.) Gamisans
- Valeriana trinervis Viv. – southern Corsica near Bonifacio
- Valeriana tripartita (Gamisans) J.-M.Tison

== Caryophyllaceae ==
- Cerastium soleirolii Ser. ex Duby
- Cerastium soleirolii subsp. stenopetalum (Fenzl ex Gren. & Godr.) Buschm.
- Dianthus gyspergerae Rouy – western Corsica
- Spergula arvensis subsp. gracilis (E.Petit) Briq.

== Cistaceae ==
- Cistus × conradiae Demoly (C. creticus × C. monspeliensis)

== Colchicaceae ==
- Colchicum arenasii Fridl. – southwestern Corsica

== Cyperaceae ==
- Carex mabilliana (Rouy) Prain

== Euphorbiaceae ==
- Euphorbia corsica Req.

== Fabaceae ==
- Anthyllis × gamisansii Delage (A. barba-jovis × A. hermanniae subsp. corsica)
- Astragalus greuteri Bacch. & Brullo
- Genista salzmannii subsp. lobelioides (Gamisans) Bacch.
- Genista salzmannii subsp. salzmannii
- Hippocrepis conradiae Gamisans & Hugot

== Hypericaceae ==
- Hypericum tetrapterum var. corsicum (Steud.) Boiss.

== Iridaceae ==
- Romulea corsica Jord. & Fourr. – southern Corsica
- Romulea × jordanii Bég. (R. ramiflora × R. revelieri)

== Juncaceae ==
- Juncus requienii Parl.

== Lamiaceae ==
- Clinopodium corsicum (Pers.) Govaerts
- Lamium cyrneum Paradis
- Nepeta agrestis Loisel.

== Lentibulariaceae ==
- Pinguicula corsica Bernard & Gren.

== Malvaceae ==
- Malva alcea subsp. ribifolia (Viv.) Kerguélen

== Nartheciaceae ==
- Narthecium reverchonii Čelak.

== Orchidaceae ==
- Anacamptis morio nothosubsp. litardierei (Ruppert & Lebrun) J.M.H.Shaw (A. morio subsp. longicornu × A. morio subsp. picta)
- Dactylorhiza cyrnea W.Foelsche & Cord-Landwehr
- Orchis × palanchonii G.Foelsche & W.Foelsche (O. olbiensis × O. pauciflora)
- × Serapicamptis debeauxii (E.G.Camus) J.M.H.Shaw (Anacamptis papilionacea × Serapias cordigera)

== Orobanchaceae ==
- Odontites luteus subsp. bonifaciensis (Rouy) P.Fourn.
- Orobanche cyrnea Jeanm.

== Plantaginaceae ==
- Chaenorhinum minus subsp. pseudorubrifolium Gamisans
- Cymbalaria hepaticifolia (Poir.) Wettst.
- Veronica hederifolia subsp. insularis Gamisans

== Plumbaginaceae ==
- Armeria leucocephala Salzm. ex W.D.J.Koch
- Armeria soleirolii (Duby) Godr – northwestern Corsica near Calvi
- Limonium bonifaciense Arrigoni & Diana
- Limonium calanchicola Erben
- Limonium contortirameum (Mabille) Erben
- Limonium corsicum Erben
- Limonium florentinum Arrigoni & Diana
- Limonium greuteri Erben
- Limonium lambinonii Erben
- Limonium obtusifolium (Rouy) Erben
- Limonium patrimoniense Arrigoni & Diana
- Limonium portovecchiense Erben
- Limonium tarcoense Arrigoni & Diana

== Poaceae ==
- Festuca gamisansii Kerguélen
- Poa pratensis subsp. dolichophylla (Hack.) Portal
- Thinopyrum corsicum (Hack.) Banfi – Sant' Angelo

== Polygalaceae ==
- Polygala nicaeensis subsp. corsica (Boreau) P.Graebn.

== Ranunculaceae ==
- Aconitum corsicum Gáyer
- Aquilegia bernardii Gren. & Godr.
- Aquilegia litardierei Briq.
- Pulsatilla scherfelii subsp. cyrnea (Gamisans) J.-M.Tison
- Ranunculus clethrophilus Litard.
- Ranunculus elisae Gamisans
- Ranunculus marschlinsii Steud.
- Ranunculus sylviae Gamisans

== Rubiaceae ==
- Galium lucidum subsp. krendlii Natali

== Santalaceae ==
- Thesium corsalpinum Hendrych
- Thesium kyrnosum Hendrych

== Saxifragaceae ==
- Micranthes stellaris var. obovata (Engl.) Gornall
- Saxifraga × conradiae J.Prudhomme (S. corsica × S. pedemontana subsp. cervicornis)

== Thymelaeaceae ==
- Thymelaea × conradiae Aboucaya & Médail (T. hirsuta × T. tartonraira)
- Thymelaea tarton-raira subsp. thomasii (Duby) Arcang. – near Ponte Leccia
