= Ali Botush Reserve =

Nature reserve on the border between Bulgaria and Greece

Ali Botush Nature Reserve
- IUCN category Ia (strict nature reserve)
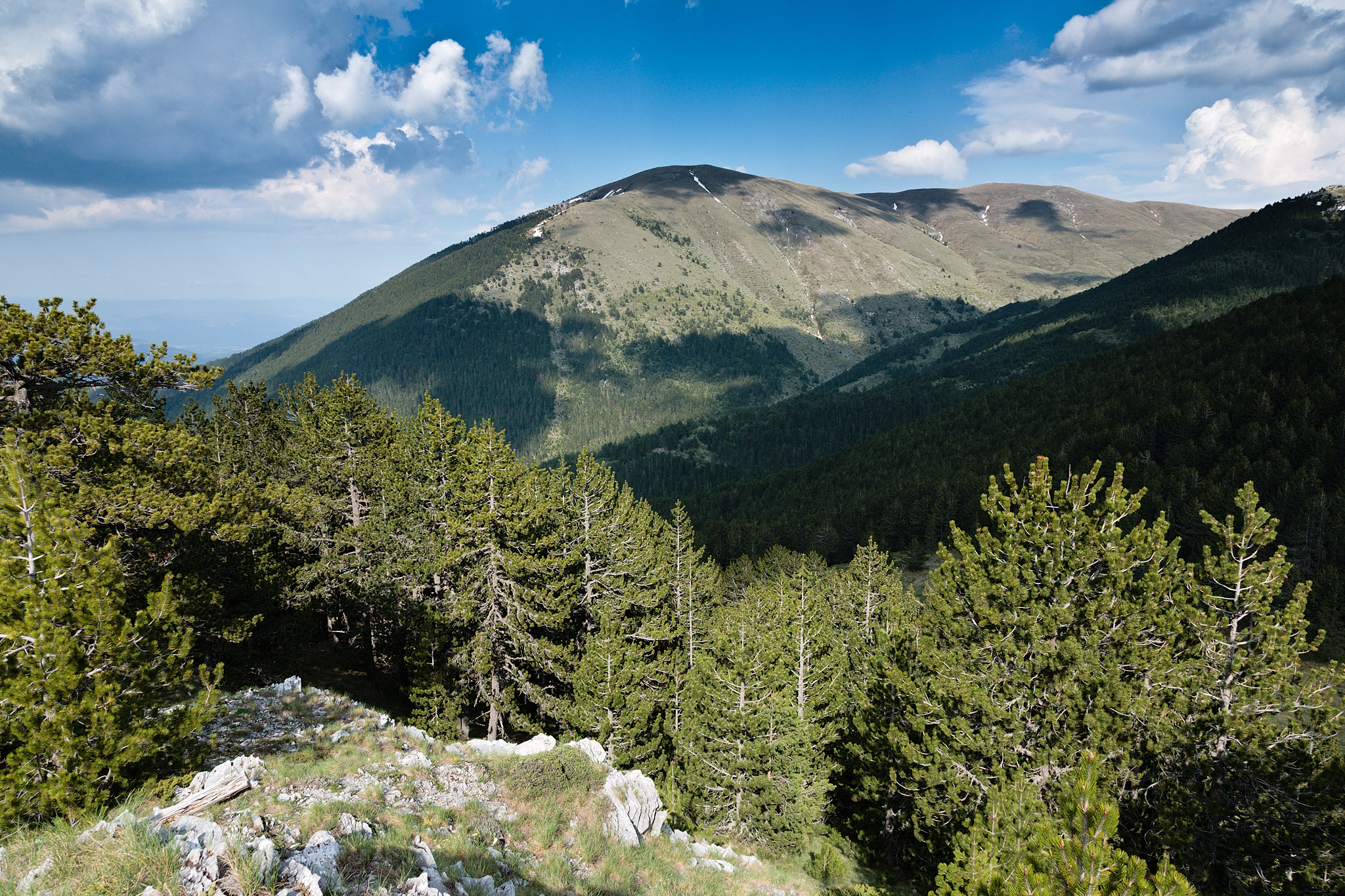

- Location within Bulgaria
- Location: Sandanski Municipality and Hadzhidimovo Municipality, Blagoevgrad Province, Bulgaria
- Nearest city: Gotse Delchev
- Coordinates: 41°22′37″N 23°37′14″E
- Area: 16.38 km^{2} (6.32 sq mi)
- Established: 24 November 1951
- Governing body: Ministry of Environment and Water

Ali Botush (Bulgarian: Али ботуш), also spelled Alibotoush, is a nature reserve in the small mountain range of Slavyanka, located on the border between Bulgaria and Greece. The reserve occupies the northern section of the mountain which lies within the territory of Bulgaria and takes its name from the old name of Slavyanka. It is situated in the municipalities of Sandanski and Hadzhidimovo, Blagoevgrad Province. It was declared in 1951 to protect the largest forests of the endemic Bosnian pine (Pinus heldreichii) in the Balkan Peninsula. Its territory was further expanded several times and spans an area of 1638 ha or 16,38 km^{2}. It was declared a UNESCO Biosphere Reserve in 1977.

The reserve was created to protect the largest forests of Bosnian pine (Pinus heldreichii) in the Balkans and is renowned for its rich flora — over 1500 species found within its limited territory.

== Geography ==
The reserve is situated on the northern slopes of the Slavyanka mountain range at altitudes between 1140 and 2212 m. It is separated from the Pirin mountain range further north by the Paril Saddle. The mountain is formed by metamorphic Paleozoic limestone and marble that cover a granite nucleus. The territory of Ali Botush has varied geomorphological forms and a number of ridges, such as Brezata, Saint Constantine, Mitnitsata, Tepleshki Peak and Chaplen Bair.

The reserve falls within the continental Mediterranean climate zone and due to its high altitude it also has Alpine climate. However, the Mediterranean influence is very strong and determines the rainfall regime, which has an autumn-winter maximum and a summer minimum. The mean temperatures in winter are much higher than the average temperatures at the same altitudes in the rest of the country. The influence of the foehn wind is very strong in the winter.

The average annual temperature for the lower parts of the reserve is 14 °C and for the highest — about 6 °C. The average duration of the period with temperatures above 10 °C for the low sections of the reserve is 200−220 days and for the high — 130 days. The annual precipitation ranges between 700 and 900 mm, and surpasses 900 mm in the highest zones. Due to the karst relief of the mountain the surface water resources of the reserve are scarce. The streams are sustained mainly with underground waters; rain provides 25−30% of the total flow volume, whereas snow forms another 20−25%.

The soil covers consists of cinnamon forest soils in lower ground and brown forest soils at higher altitude. The humus-carbonate soil type predominates but there are also mountain-meadow soils in the highest sections. The humus-carbonate soils are shallow to moderately deep. They are usually dry and warm.

== Flora ==
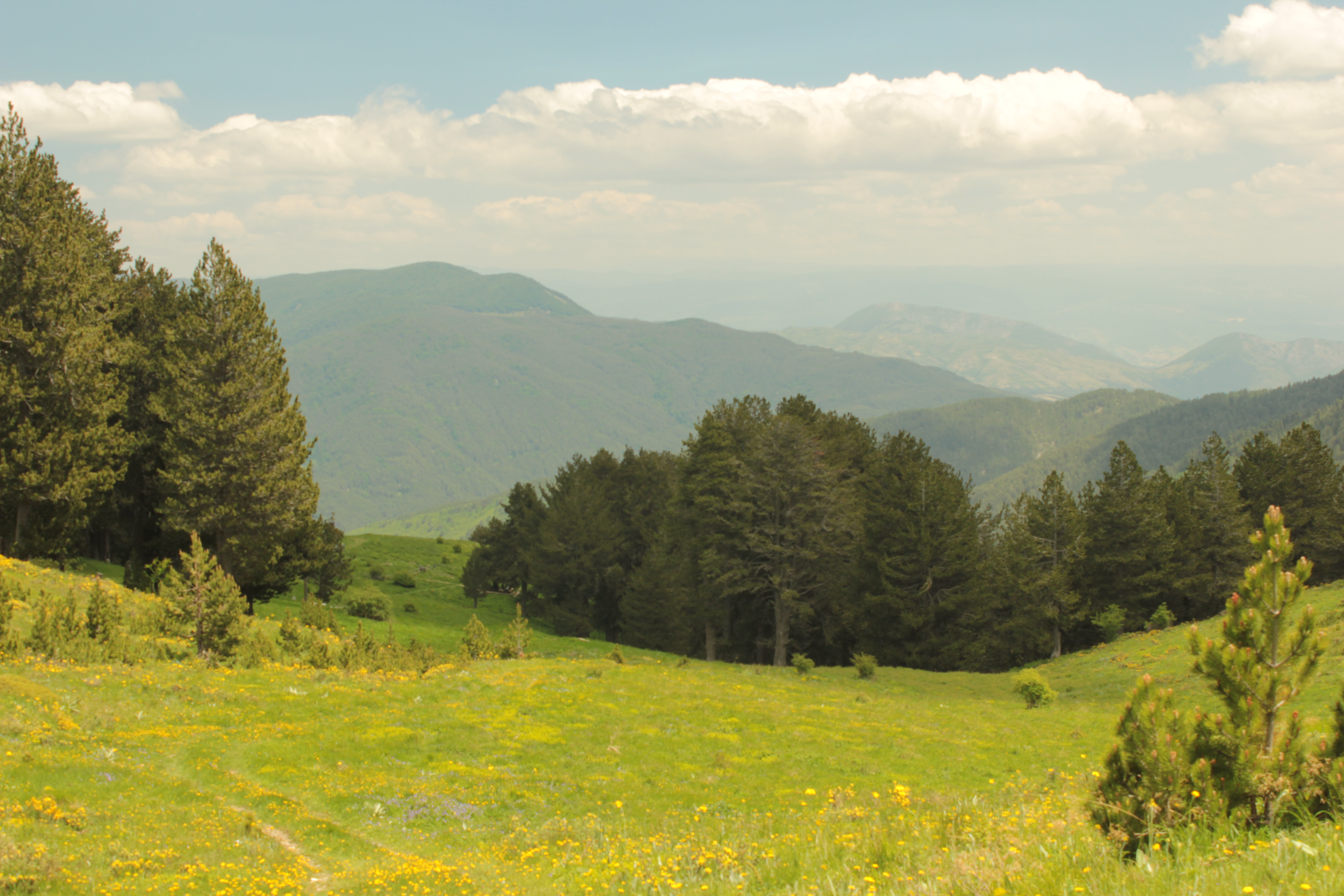
A view of the reserve

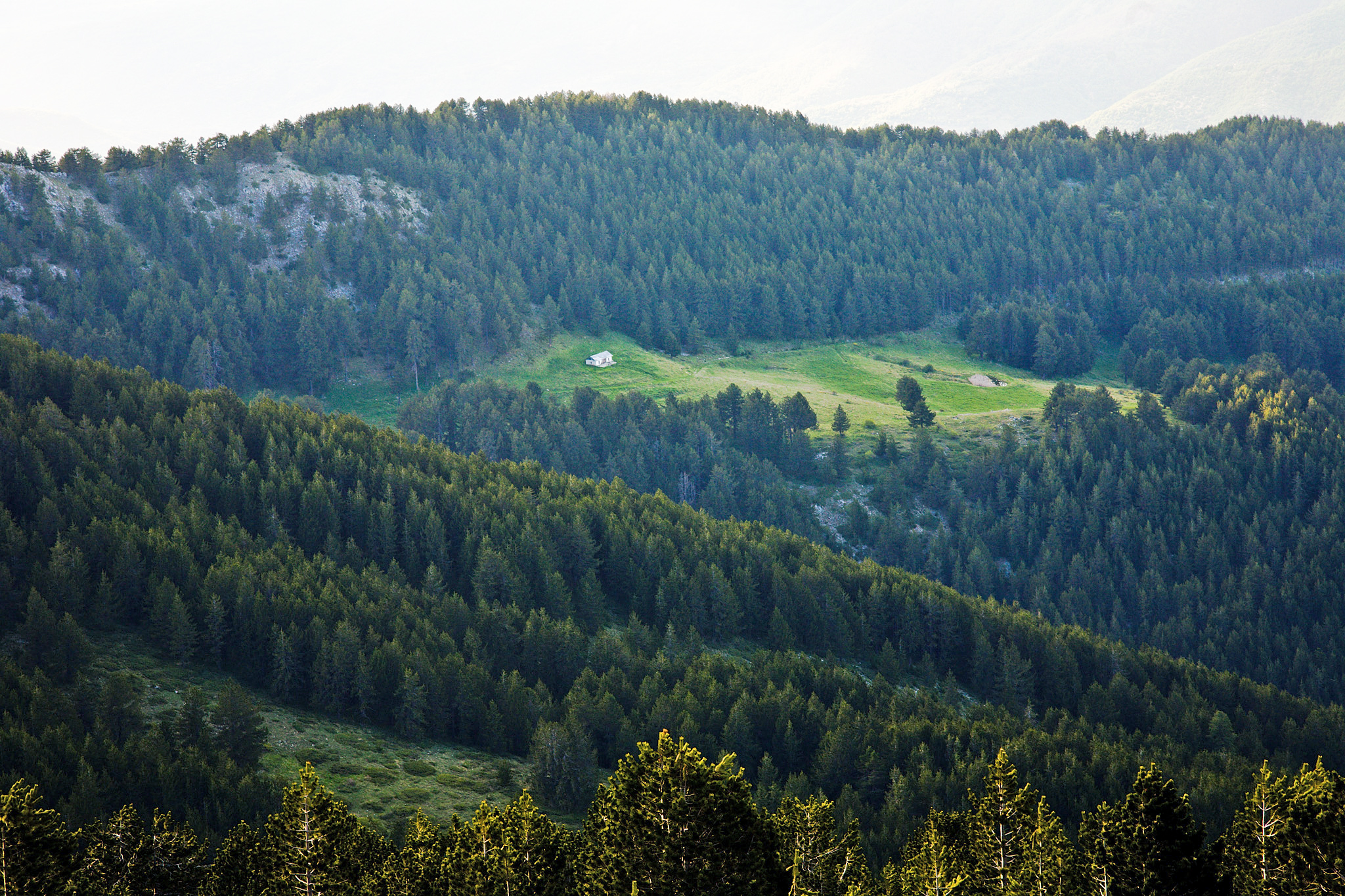
Marina Polyana locality, the only place with potable water in the higher sections of the reserve

Ali Botush is home to diverse flora which has remain intact and pristine due to the reserve's relative isolation in the border zone. On its tiny territory there are over 1500 species of vascular plants which makes it a key floristic formation centre in the Balkan Peninsula. There are over 20 Bulgarian endemic species, of which five can only be observed in the reserve, and 42 to 46 Balkan endemic taxa. The plant species are both from the Mediterranean evergreen forests biome and from the temperate forests biome.

The deciduous forests in the lowest reaches of the reserve are dominated by European beech (Fagus sylvatica) and European hop-hornbeam (Ostrya carpinifolia), and more rarely — sweet chestnut (Castanea sativa). The coniferous forest belt is composed of Scots pine (Pinus sylvestris), black pine (Pinus nigra), Norway spruce (Picea abies), European silver fir (Abies alba), Bulgarian fir (Abies borisii-regis), Macedonian pine (Pinus peuce) and Bosnian pine (Pinus heldreichii). The dominant tree species of lower coniferous belt between 1000 and 1450 m is the black pine, while the woods at higher altitudes up to 1800–1900 m are formed by Bosnian pine and are the largest of their kind in the Balkans. The reserve, as well as Pirin National Park are the only habitats of this pine species in Bulgaria. The average age of the Bosnian pine forests is 60 to 120 years, reaching over 200 and rarely 400 years. The height of the individual trees can surpass 30 m. The beech and the fir grow in shady habitats with riches soils while the Bosnian pine occupies zones with less nutrients.

The shrub vegetation in the reserve is also varied and is composed of European yew (Taxus baccata), Bulgarian spurge laurel (Daphne kosaninii), spurge laurel (Daphne mezereum), Daphne oleoides and others.

The herbaceous vegetation is very diverse due to the favourable climate and soil conditions, as well as the limestone bedrock. The Bulgarian section of Slavyanka is the only habitat of the endemic Convolvulus suendermanii. Important protected species include the black maidenhair fern (Adiantum capillus-veneris), Polygala nicaeensis, Rhamnus fallax, as well as the Balkan endemic species Fritillaria drenovskii, restricted to Slavyanka, Pirin and northern Greece, Pulsatilla rhodopaea, Saxifraga siribrnyi, long-spur violet (Viola delphinantha), restricted to this area of Bulgaria, as well as Greece, Paril centaurea (Centaurea parilica), restricted to Slavyanka and southern Pirin, etc.

In 2012 one of the world's rarest fungi, Zeus olympius, known until then only from Mount Olympus in Greece, was discovered in Ali Botush. It grows only in association with Bosnian pine.

== Fauna ==
The fauna of the reserve is also varied. The most common larger mammals include brown bear, gray wolf, roe deer, wild boar, European hare, red fox, European badger and golden jackal. The reptiles are diverse and include two species of turtles, spur-thighed tortoise and Hermann's tortoise, as well as numerous snakes and lizards, such as the rare European cat snake and the Erhard's wall lizard. It is the only place in Bulgaria where the Macedonian crested newt is found.

Of the invertebrate species between 55 and 60% belong to the Mediterranean biome. So far, over 1200 insect species have been described from the reserve. The diurnal butterflies are of particular interest. In 1992 biologist Zdravko Kolev identified five new butterfly species for Bulgaria — eastern greenish black-tip (Euchloe penia), Phalakron blue (Polyommatus andronicus), Grecian anomalous blue (Polyommatus aroaniensis), Higgin's anomalous blue (Polyommatus nephohiptamenos) and Dils' grayling (Pseudochazara orestes); of them all except for the eastern greenish black-tip are Balkan endemic species and all other than the Grecian anomalous blue can be observed in Bulgaria only in Slavyanka and Pirin mountains.

== See also ==
- Geography of Bulgaria
- List of protected areas of Bulgaria
- List of mountains in Bulgaria
- Slavyanka
- Pirin
