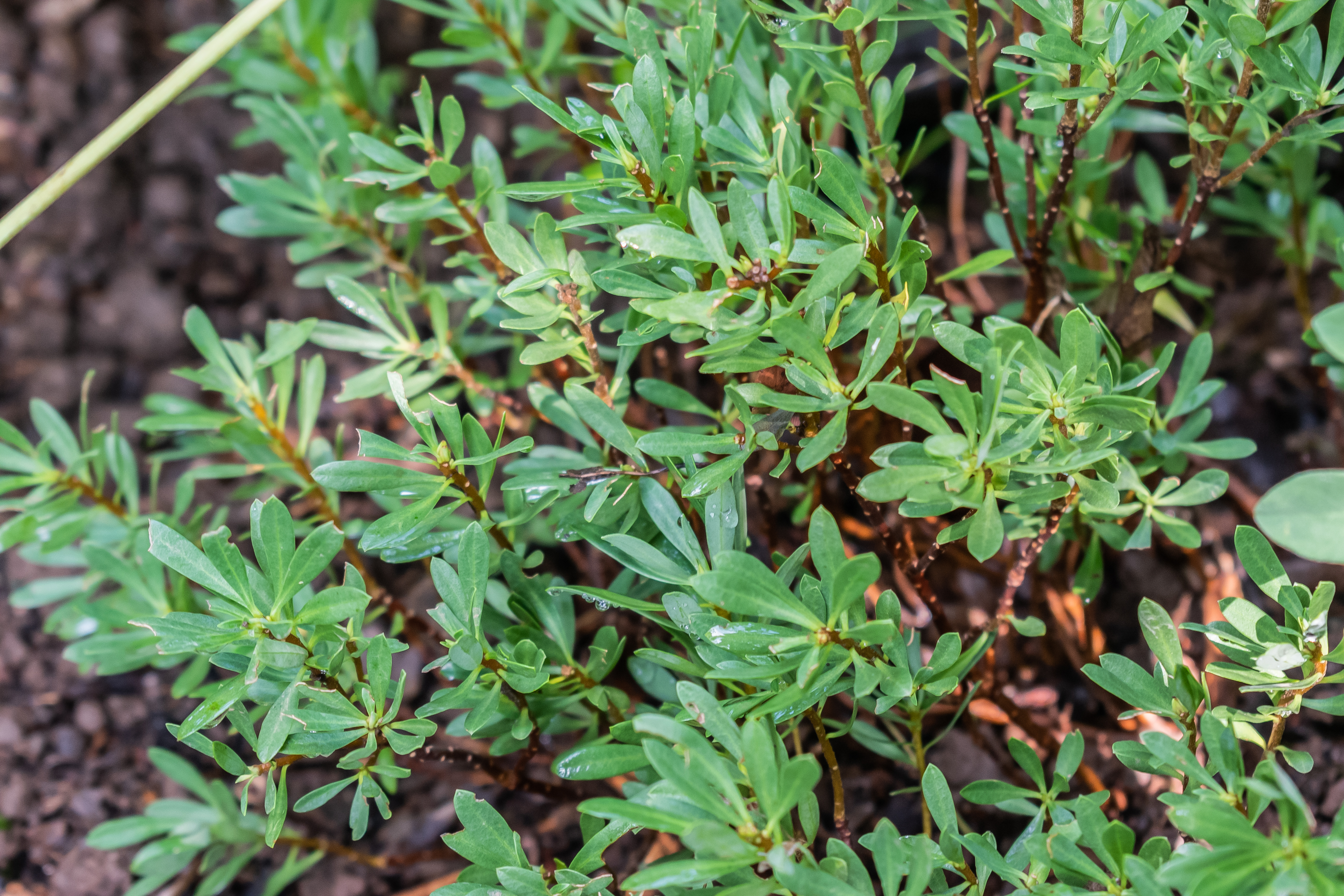

Scientific classification
- Kingdom: Plantae
- Clade: Tracheophytes
- Clade: Angiosperms
- Clade: Eudicots
- Clade: Rosids
- Order: Malvales
- Family: Thymelaeaceae
- Genus: Daphne
- Species: D. kosaninii

Binomial name
- Daphne kosaninii Stoj.

= Daphne kosaninii =

Species of shrub

Daphne kosaninii is a shrub, of the family Thymelaeaceae. It is native to south-western Bulgaria in the Pirin and Slavyanka mountain ranges, and North Macedonia, specifically Suva Gora.

== Description ==
The shrub is evergreen, and grows up to 0.2 meters tall. Its flowers are tinged pink and white, its fruits are orange, and its leaves are blue-green. It is often found on rocky slopes and in open forests at high altitudes.
