= Polyommatus andronicus =

Scientific classification
- Kingdom: Animalia
- Phylum: Arthropoda
- Class: Insecta
- Order: Lepidoptera
- Family: Lycaenidae
- Genus: Polyommatus
- Species: P. andronicus

Binomial name
- Polyommatus andronicus Coutsis & Gavalas, 1995

Species of butterfly

Polyommatus andronicus is a butterfly in the family Lycaenidae. It is found in north-eastern Greece and south-western Bulgaria, where it inhabits the mountain ranges Slavyanka and southern Pirin.

== Taxonomy ==
Some authors consider Polyommatus andronicus to be a separate species, while others treat it as a synonym of Polyommatus icarus.
