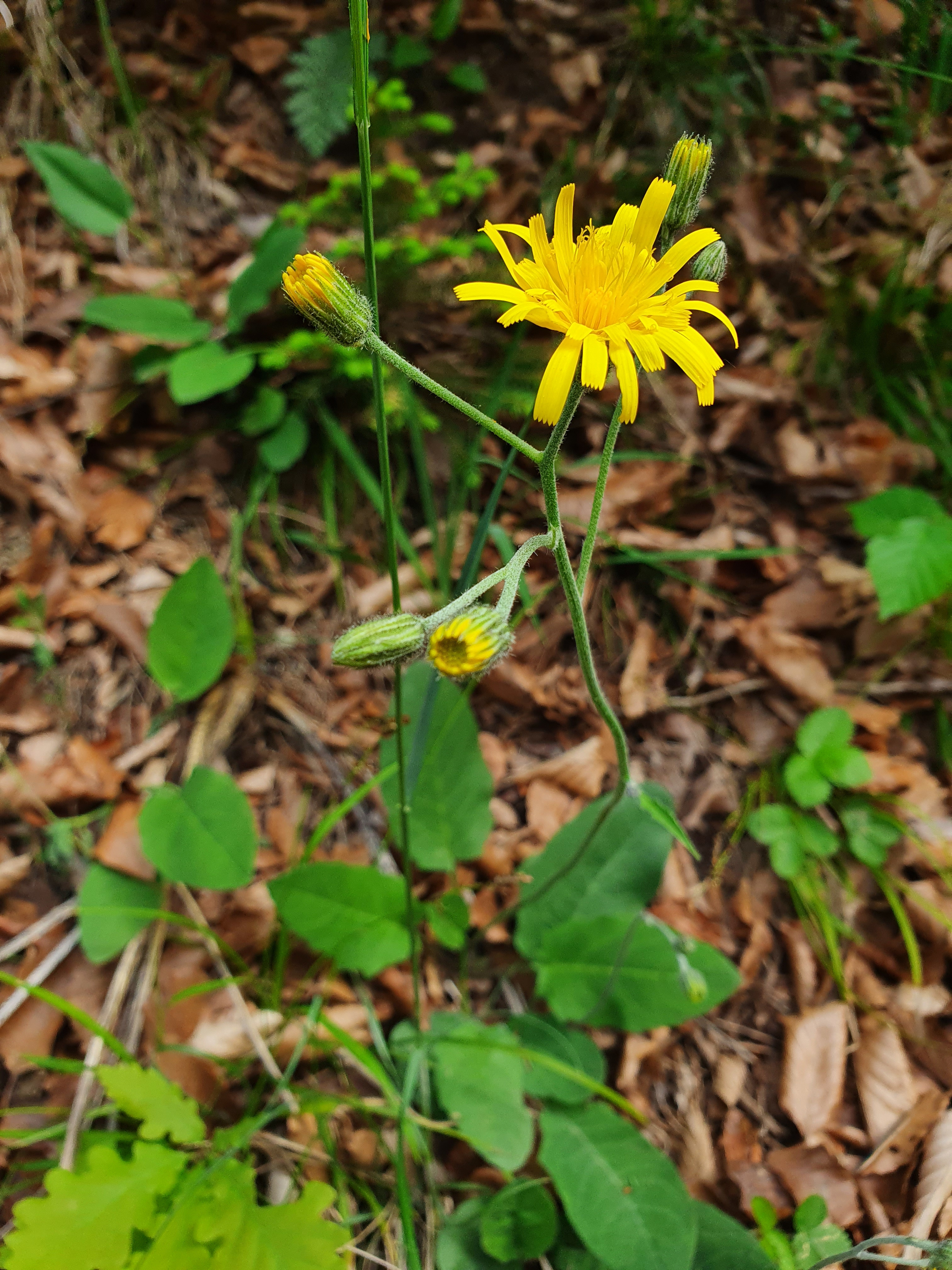
- Hieracium hypochoeroides subsp. wiesbaurianiforme Greuter

Scientific classification
- Kingdom: Plantae
- Clade: Tracheophytes
- Clade: Angiosperms
- Clade: Eudicots
- Clade: Asterids
- Order: Asterales
- Family: Asteraceae
- Genus: Hieracium
- Species: H. hypochoeroides

Binomial name
- Hieracium hypochoeroides S.Gibson

Synonyms
- List: Hieracium adesum (Bernoulli & Zahn) Prain; Hieracium apertorum (Bornm. & Schack ex Zahn) Joch.Müll.; Hieracium bifidum var. subcinereum Arv.-Touv. & Gaut.; Hieracium bridelianum (Zahn) Prain; Hieracium caerulaceum subsp. serinense Zahn; Hieracium canibifidum Arv.-Touv.; Hieracium crinicaesium (Schack & Zahn) Joch.Müll.; Hieracium criniferum Sudre; Hieracium dolichellum Arv.-Touv. & Gaut.; Hieracium epirense (Zahn) Buttler; Hieracium erucibifidum Arv.-Touv.; Hieracium euwiesbaurianiforme (Schack & Zahn) Joch.Müll.; Hieracium fissifurcum Arv.-Touv. & Gaut.; Hieracium glaucibifidum Arv.-Touv. & Gaut.; Hieracium glaucinum subsp. guaranum (Arv.-Touv. & Gaut.) O.Bolòs & Vigo; Hieracium grossidentatum Joch.Müll.; Hieracium guaranum Arv.-Touv. & Gaut.; Hieracium jenzigense (Bornm. & Zahn) Joch.Müll.; Hieracium lithophilum Arv.-Touv.; Hieracium medelingense Wiesb. ex Dichtl; Hieracium murorum var. sublanigerum Arv.-Touv. ex Belli; Hieracium nervulosum Arv.-Touv. & Gaut.; Hieracium nervulosum var. subcanens Arv.-Touv. & Gaut.; Hieracium nervulosum var. ventosicum Arv.-Touv. & Gaut.; Hieracium niphanthodes (Bornm. & Zahn) Joch.Müll.; Hieracium parvimaculatum Joch.Müll.; Hieracium plauense (Schack & Zahn) Joch.Müll.; Hieracium praecox var. kalmutinum Zahn; Hieracium pseudograniticum (Besse & Zahn) Zahn; Hieracium rigoanum Arv.-Touv. & Belli; Hieracium romieuxianum Zahn; Hieracium romieuxianum subsp. glaucocinerascens Harz & Zahn ex Schack; Hieracium romieuxianum subsp. plauense Schack & Zahn; Hieracium rudolphopolitanum Joch.Müll.; Hieracium sartorianum var. lucanicum Arv.-Touv.; Hieracium serinense Zahn; Hieracium sommerfeltii subsp. crinicaesium Schack & Zahn; Hieracium stoechadum Sudre; Hieracium supramontanum Arrigoni; Hieracium ventosicum Arv.-Touv.; Hieracium wiesbaurianum Uechtr.; Hieracium wiesbaurianum subsp. acutiserratum Zahn; Hieracium wiesbaurianum subsp. adesiforme Zahn; Hieracium wiesbaurianum subsp. adesum Bernoulli & Zahn; Hieracium wiesbaurianum subsp. apertorum Bornm. & Schack ex Zahn; Hieracium wiesbaurianum subsp. arnoldianum Zahn; Hieracium wiesbaurianum subsp. ayliesii Zahn; Hieracium wiesbaurianum subsp. bifidopsis Zahn; Hieracium wiesbaurianum subsp. bridelianum Zahn; Hieracium wiesbaurianum subsp. cinarescentiforme Zahn; Hieracium wiesbaurianum subsp. crinifrons Zahn; Hieracium wiesbaurianum subsp. cryptochaetophyllum T.Georgiev & Zahn; Hieracium wiesbaurianum subsp. cyanellum Zahn; Hieracium wiesbaurianum subsp. dalmaticum Kümmerle & Zahn; Hieracium wiesbaurianum subsp. divergentidens Schack & Zahn; Hieracium wiesbaurianum subsp. epimecodon Romieux & Zahn; Hieracium wiesbaurianum subsp. epimecodontoides Romieux & Zahn; Hieracium wiesbaurianum subsp. epirense Zahn; Hieracium wiesbaurianum var. euwiesbaurianiforme Schack & Zahn; Hieracium wiesbaurianum subsp. fojnicense Zahn; Hieracium wiesbaurianum subsp. gladiatiforme Schack & Zahn; Hieracium wiesbaurianum subsp. guestphalicum Gottschl.; Hieracium wiesbaurianum subsp. hemibifidum Zahn; Hieracium wiesbaurianum subsp. herculanum Zahn; Hieracium wiesbaurianum subsp. hypotephraeum Zahn; Hieracium wiesbaurianum subsp. jacquiniiforme Litard. & Zahn; Hieracium wiesbaurianum subsp. jenzigense Bornm. & Zahn; Hieracium wiesbaurianum subsp. kunitzburgense Bornm. & Zahn; Hieracium wiesbaurianum subsp. kyllenense Zahn; Hieracium wiesbaurianum subsp. lineatiforme Zahn; Hieracium wiesbaurianum subsp. lineatoides Zahn; Hieracium wiesbaurianum subsp. livadicae O.Behr; Hieracium wiesbaurianum subsp. monomeres Zahn; Hieracium wiesbaurianum subsp. niphanthodes Bornm. & Zahn; Hieracium wiesbaurianum subsp. pinnatiscissum Zahn; Hieracium wiesbaurianum subsp. poeciloprasum Briq. & Zahn; Hieracium wiesbaurianum subsp. prasinophyton Zahn; Hieracium wiesbaurianum subsp. pseudograniticum Besse & Zahn; Hieracium wiesbaurianum subsp. pseudomonomeres Zahn; Hieracium wiesbaurianum subsp. pseudowiesbaurianiforme Müll.Dornst. & Zahn; Hieracium wiesbaurianum subsp. retroversidens Zahn; Hieracium wiesbaurianum subsp. semicinerascens Bornm. & Zahn; Hieracium wiesbaurianum subsp. semiwiesbaurianum Gottschl.; Hieracium wiesbaurianum subsp. serinense (Zahn) Gottschl.; Hieracium wiesbaurianum subsp. strizakense O.Behr; Hieracium wiesbaurianum subsp. subcaesiellum Zahn; Hieracium wiesbaurianum subsp. sublineolatum Zahn; Hieracium wiesbaurianum subsp. terrei de Retz; Hieracium wiesbaurianum subsp. uazzanum Zahn

= Hieracium hypochoeroides =

Species of flowering plant

Hieracium hypochoeroides, the cat's-ear hawkweed, is a species of flowering plant in the family Asteraceae, native to Europe. Hieracium hypochoeroides is a recently arisen species aggregate.

== Images ==
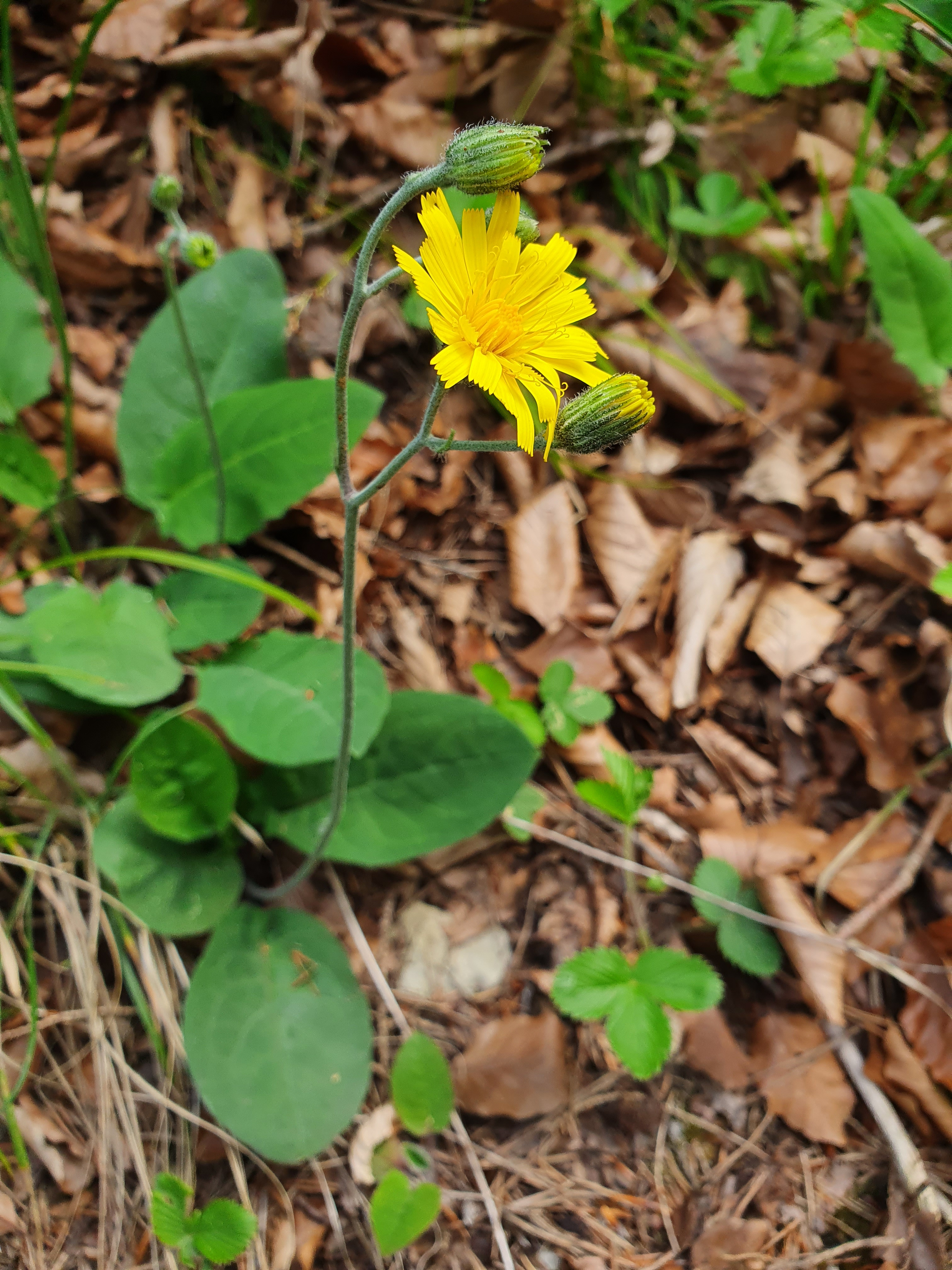
Specimen of Hieracium hypochoeroides subsp. jenzigense (Bornm. & Zahn) Greuter

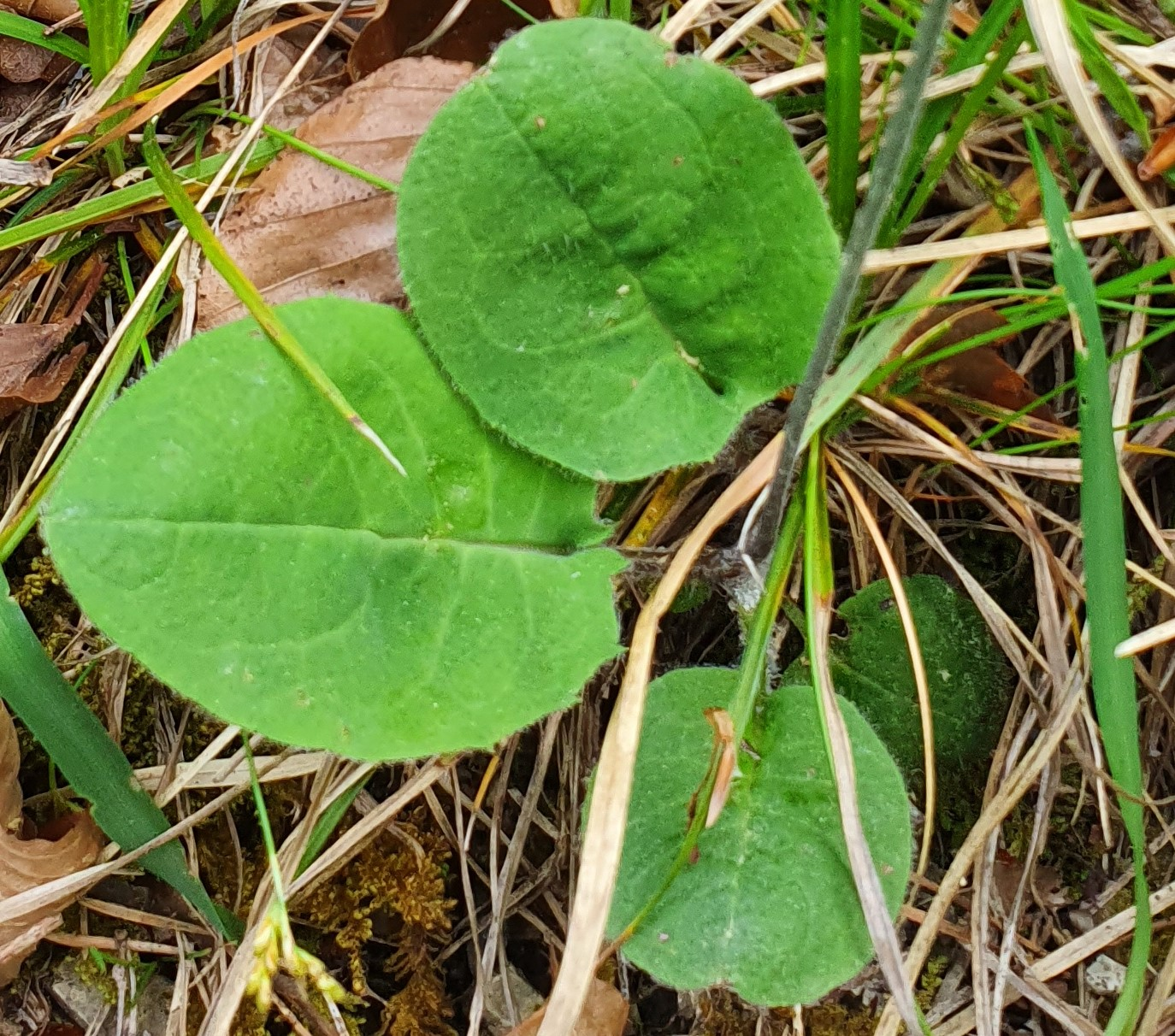
Basal leaf detail of Hieracium hypochoeroides subsp. jenzigense (Bornm. & Zahn) Greuter

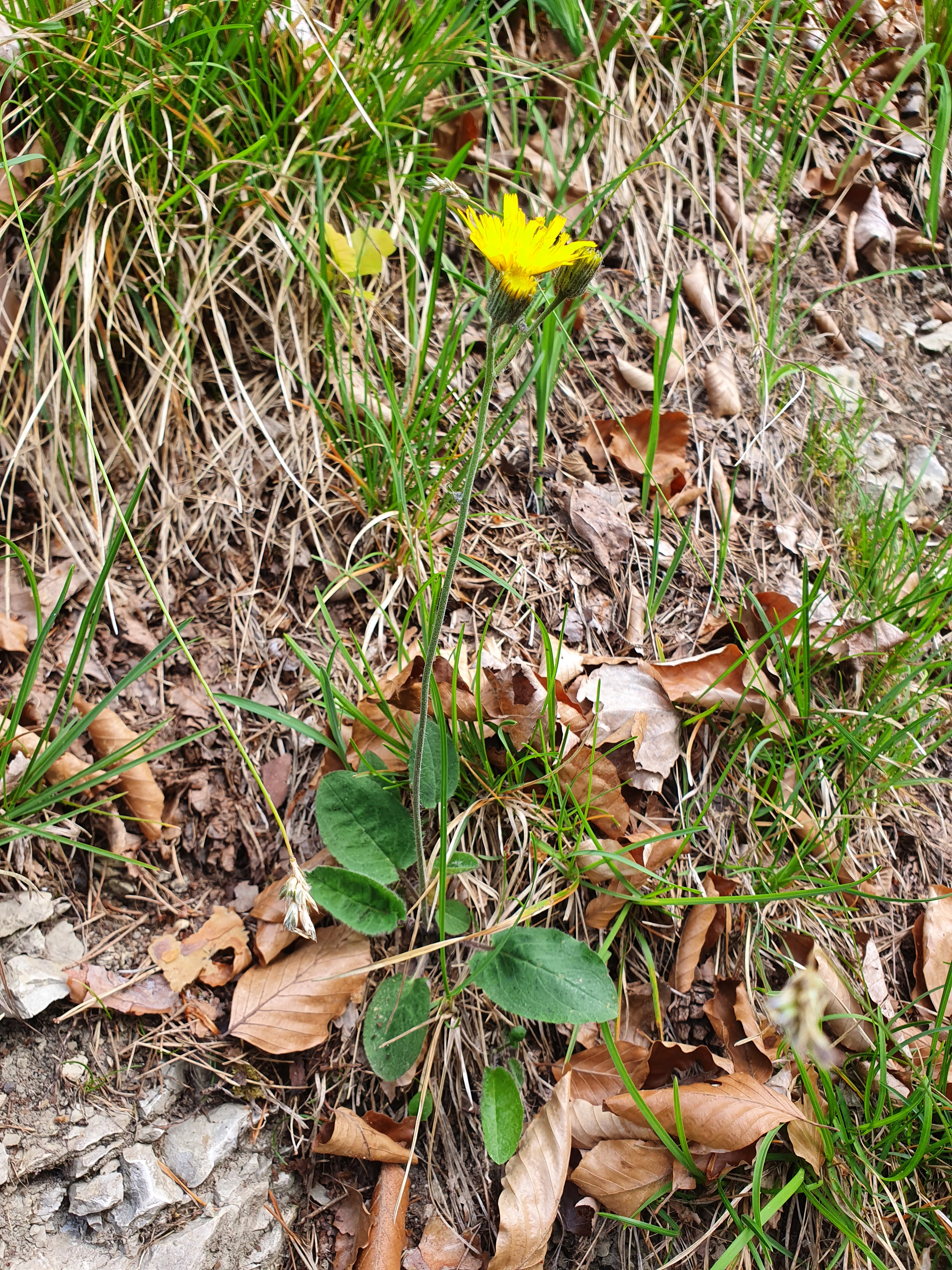
Specimen of Hieracium hypochoeroides subsp. parvimaculatum (Joch.Müll.) Greuter

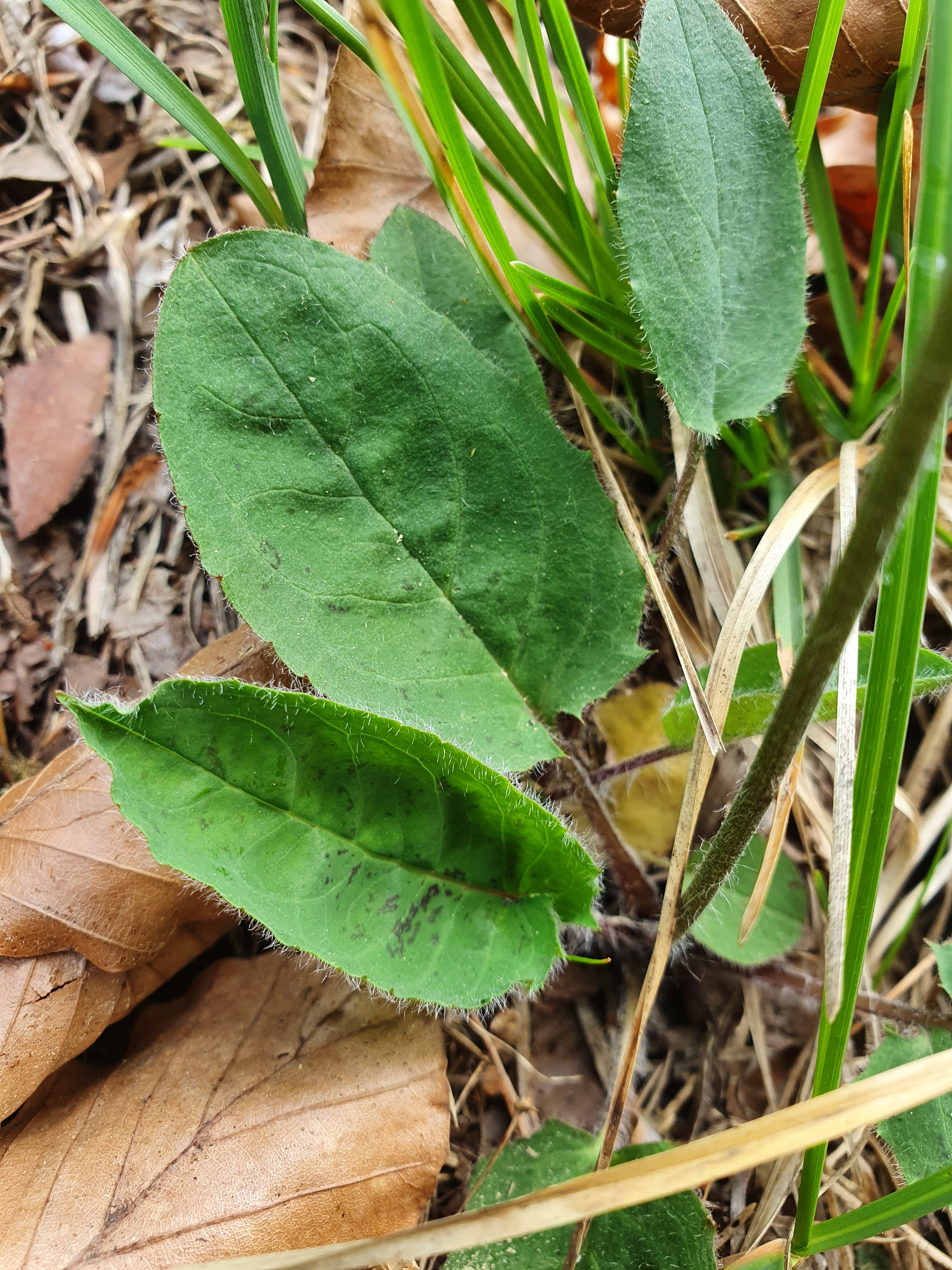
Basal leaf detail of Hieracium hypochoeroides subsp. parvimaculatum (Joch.Müll.) Greuter with typical leaf spotting

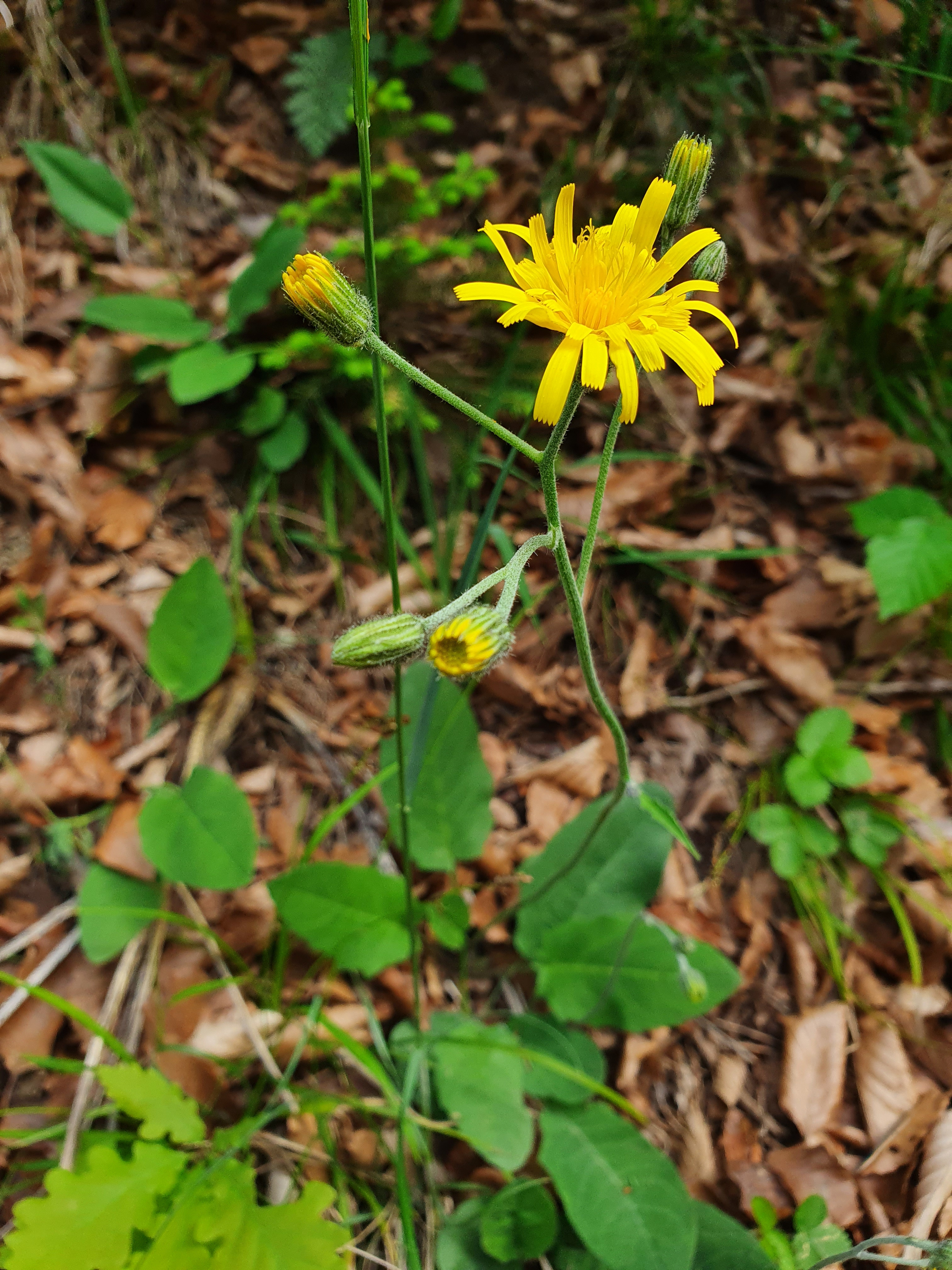
Specimen of Hieracium hypochoeroides subsp. wiesbaurianiforme Greuter

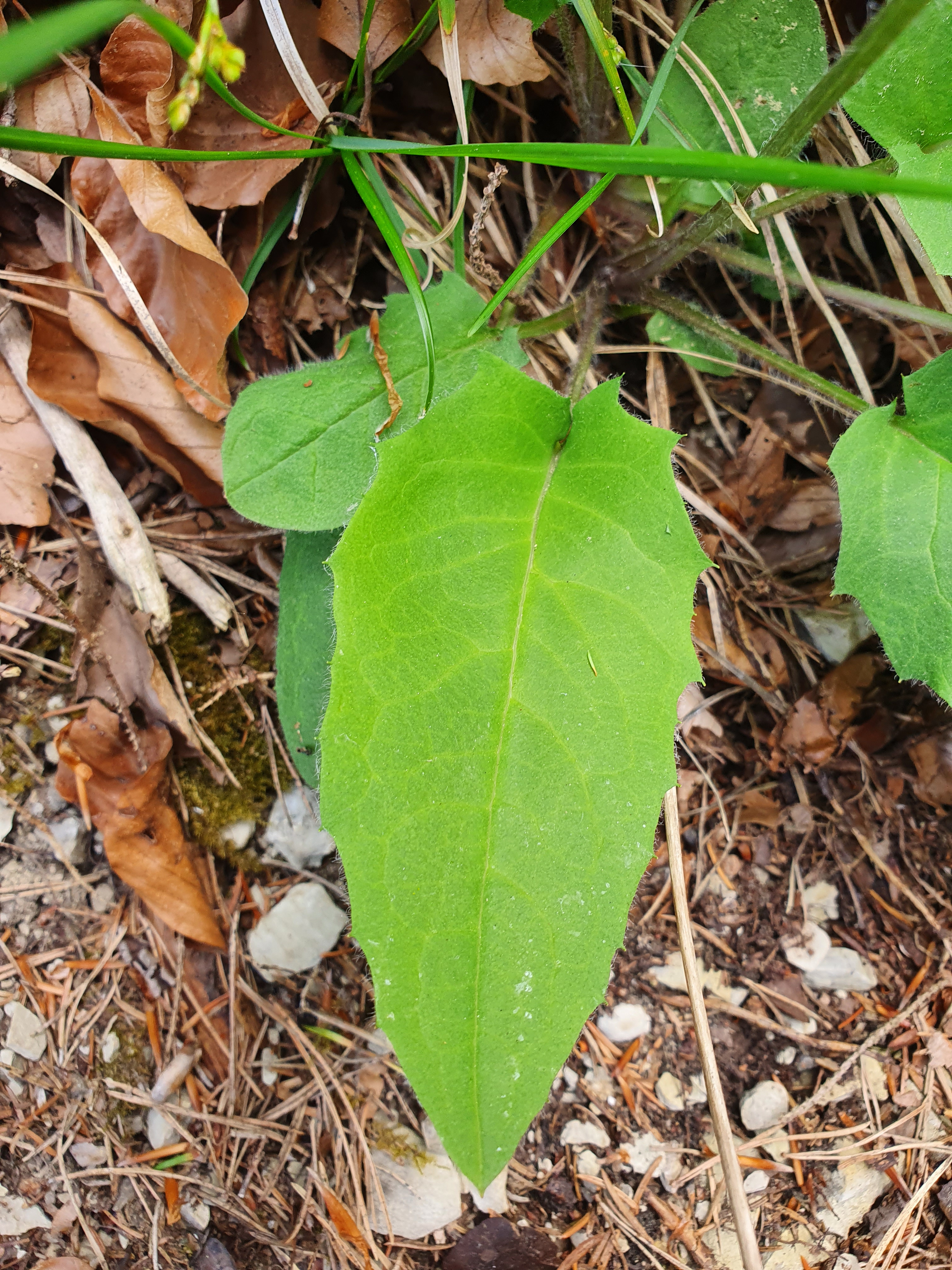
Basal leaf detail of Hieracium hypochoeroides subsp. wiesbaurianiforme Greuter

== Subtaxa ==
The following subspecies are accepted:

- Hieracium hypochoeroides subsp. acutiserratum (Zahn) Greuter – France
- Hieracium hypochoeroides subsp. adesiforme (Zahn) Greuter – France, Italy, Switzerland
- Hieracium hypochoeroides subsp. adesum (Bernoulli & Zahn) Greuter – France, Italy, Switzerland
- Hieracium hypochoeroides subsp. apertorum (Zahn) Greuter – Germany
- Hieracium hypochoeroides subsp. arnoldianum (Zahn) W.Lippert & Schuhw. – Germany
- Hieracium hypochoeroides subsp. ayliesii (Zahn) Greuter – Corsica
- Hieracium hypochoeroides subsp. bifidopsis (Zahn) Gottschl. – Italy
- Hieracium hypochoeroides subsp. bridelianum (Zahn) Greuter – France, Italy, Switzerland
- Hieracium hypochoeroides subsp. canibifidum (Arv.-Touv.) Greuter – France
- Hieracium hypochoeroides subsp. cilentanum Di Grist., Gottschl. & Raimondo – Italy
- Hieracium hypochoeroides subsp. cinerascentiforme (Zahn) Greuter – France, Italy
- Hieracium hypochoeroides subsp. crinicaesium (Schack & Zahn) Greuter – Germany
- Hieracium hypochoeroides subsp. crinifrons (Zahn) Greuter – France
- Hieracium hypochoeroides subsp. cryptochaetophyllum (T.Georgiev & Zahn) Greuter – Bulgaria
- Hieracium hypochoeroides subsp. cyanellum (Zahn) Greuter – France
- Hieracium hypochoeroides subsp. dalmaticum (Kümmerle & Zahn) Greuter – Slovenia, Croatia
- Hieracium hypochoeroides subsp. divergentidens (Schack & Zahn) Greuter – Liechtenstein
- Hieracium hypochoeroides subsp. dolichellum (Arv.-Touv. & Gaut.) Greuter – Austria, France, Italy, Switzerland
- Hieracium hypochoeroides subsp. epimecodon (Romieux & Zahn) Greuter – France
- Hieracium hypochoeroides subsp. epimecodontoides (Romieux & Zahn) Greuter – France
- Hieracium hypochoeroides subsp. epirense (Zahn) Greuter – Greece, Switzerland
- Hieracium hypochoeroides subsp. erucibifidum (Arv.-Touv.) Greuter – France
- Hieracium hypochoeroides subsp. fissifurcum (Arv.-Touv. & Gaut.) Greuter – Corsica, France
- Hieracium hypochoeroides subsp. fojnicense (Zahn) Greuter – Yugoslavia
- Hieracium hypochoeroides subsp. gladiatiforme (Schack & Zahn) Greuter – Germany
- Hieracium hypochoeroides subsp. glaucibifidum (Arv.-Touv. & Gaut.) Greuter – France, Italy
- Hieracium hypochoeroides subsp. glaucocinerascens (Harz & Zahn ex Schack) Schuhw. – Germany
- Hieracium hypochoeroides subsp. grandisaxense Gottschl. – Italy
- Hieracium hypochoeroides subsp. grossidentatum (Joch.Müll.) Greuter – Germany
- Hieracium hypochoeroides subsp. guaranum (Arv.-Touv. & Gaut.) Greuter – Spain
- Hieracium hypochoeroides subsp. guestphalicum (Gottschl.) Greuter – Germany
- Hieracium hypochoeroides subsp. hemibifidum (Zahn) Greuter – France, Italy
- Hieracium hypochoeroides subsp. herculanum (Zahn) Greuter – Romania
- Hieracium hypochoeroides subsp. hypochoeroides – Austria, Corsica, Czechoslovakia, France, Faroe Islands, Germany, Great Britain, Hungary, Ireland, Italy, Norway, Romania, Sardinia, Switzerland, Yugoslavia
- Hieracium hypochoeroides subsp. hypotephraeum (Zahn) Greuter – France
- Hieracium hypochoeroides subsp. jacquiniiforme (Litard. & Zahn) Greuter – Corsica
- Hieracium hypochoeroides subsp. jenzigense (Bornm. & Zahn) Greuter – Germany
- Hieracium hypochoeroides subsp. kalmutinum (Zahn) Schuhw. & Feulner – Germany
- Hieracium hypochoeroides subsp. kunitzburgense (Bornm. & Zahn) Greuter – Germany
- Hieracium hypochoeroides subsp. kyllenense (Zahn) Greuter – Greece
- Hieracium hypochoeroides subsp. lineatiforme (Zahn) Greuter – France, Italy
- Hieracium hypochoeroides subsp. lineatoides (Zahn) Greuter – France, Italy
- Hieracium hypochoeroides subsp. lithophilum (Arv.-Touv.) Greuter – Corsica, France, Italy
- Hieracium hypochoeroides subsp. livadicae (O.Behr) Greuter – Yugoslavia
- Hieracium hypochoeroides subsp. lucanicum (Arv.-Touv.) Di Grist., Gottschl. & Raimondo – Italy
- Hieracium hypochoeroides subsp. medelingense (Wiesb. ex Dichtl) Gottschl. – Austria
- Hieracium hypochoeroides subsp. mollardianum (Briq. & Zahn) Greuter – France
- Hieracium hypochoeroides subsp. monomeres (Zahn) Greuter – Austria, France
- Hieracium hypochoeroides subsp. montis-scuderii Di Grist., Gottschl., Galesi, Raimondo & Cristaudo – Sicily
- Hieracium hypochoeroides subsp. nervulosum (Arv.-Touv. & Gaut.) Greuter – Corsica, France, Italy
- Hieracium hypochoeroides subsp. niphanthodes (Bornm. & Zahn) Greuter – Germany
- Hieracium hypochoeroides subsp. pallidopsis Gottschl. – Italy
- Hieracium hypochoeroides subsp. parvimaculatum (Joch.Müll.) Greuter – Germany
- Hieracium hypochoeroides subsp. peracutisquamum Di Grist., Gottschl. & Raimondo – Italy
- Hieracium hypochoeroides subsp. pinnatiscissum (Zahn) Greuter – Italy
- Hieracium hypochoeroides subsp. plauense (Schack & Zahn) Greuter – Germany
- Hieracium hypochoeroides subsp. poeciloprasum (Briq. & Zahn) Greuter – France
- Hieracium hypochoeroides subsp. potamogetifolium Gottschl. – Italy
- Hieracium hypochoeroides subsp. prasinophyton (Zahn) Gottschl. – France, Italy, Switzerland
- Hieracium hypochoeroides subsp. pseudograniticum (Besse & Zahn) Greuter – France, Italy
- Hieracium hypochoeroides subsp. pseudomonomeres (Zahn) Greuter – France
- Hieracium hypochoeroides subsp. pseudowiesbaurianiforme (Müll.Dornst. & Zahn) Greuter – Germany, Liechtenstein
- Hieracium hypochoeroides subsp. retroversidens (Zahn) Greuter – Greece
- Hieracium hypochoeroides subsp. rivulicola N.Mey., Gottschl. & Reisch – Germany
- Hieracium hypochoeroides subsp. romieuxianum (Zahn) Greuter – France, Switzerland
- Hieracium hypochoeroides subsp. rudolphopolitanum (Joch.Müll.) Greuter – Germany
- Hieracium hypochoeroides subsp. semicinerascens (Bornm. & Zahn) Greuter – Germany, Liechtenstein, Hungary
- Hieracium hypochoeroides subsp. semiwiesbaurianum (Gottschl.) Greuter – Austria
- Hieracium hypochoeroides subsp. serinense (Zahn) Greuter – Italy
- Hieracium hypochoeroides subsp. stoechadum (Sudre) Greuter – France
- Hieracium hypochoeroides subsp. strizakense (O.Behr) Greuter – North Macedonia
- Hieracium hypochoeroides subsp. subcaesiellum (Zahn) Greuter – France
- Hieracium hypochoeroides subsp. subcanens (Arv.-Touv. & Gaut.) Greuter – France, Italy
- Hieracium hypochoeroides subsp. subcinereum (Arv.-Touv. & Gaut.) Greuter – Albania, France, Italy, Yugoslavia
- Hieracium hypochoeroides subsp. sublanigerum (Arv.-Touv. ex Belli) Gottschl. & Wagens. – Italy
- Hieracium hypochoeroides subsp. sublineolatum (Zahn) Greuter – France, Italy
- Hieracium hypochoeroides subsp. supramontanum (Arrigoni) Greuter – Sardinia
- Hieracium hypochoeroides subsp. terrei (de Retz) Greuter – Corsica
- Hieracium hypochoeroides subsp. uazzanum (Zahn) Greuter – Corsica
- Hieracium hypochoeroides subsp. venatovicianum N.Mey., Gottschl. & Reisch – Germany
- Hieracium hypochoeroides subsp. ventosicum (Arv.-Touv. & Gaut.) Greuter – France
- Hieracium hypochoeroides subsp. wiesbaurianiforme Greuter – Germany
- Hieracium hypochoeroides subsp. wiesbaurianum (R.Uechtr.) Greuter – Austria, Belgium, Bulgaria, Corsica, Czechoslovakia, France, Germany, Hungary, Italy, Poland, Romania, Sardinia, Yugoslavia
