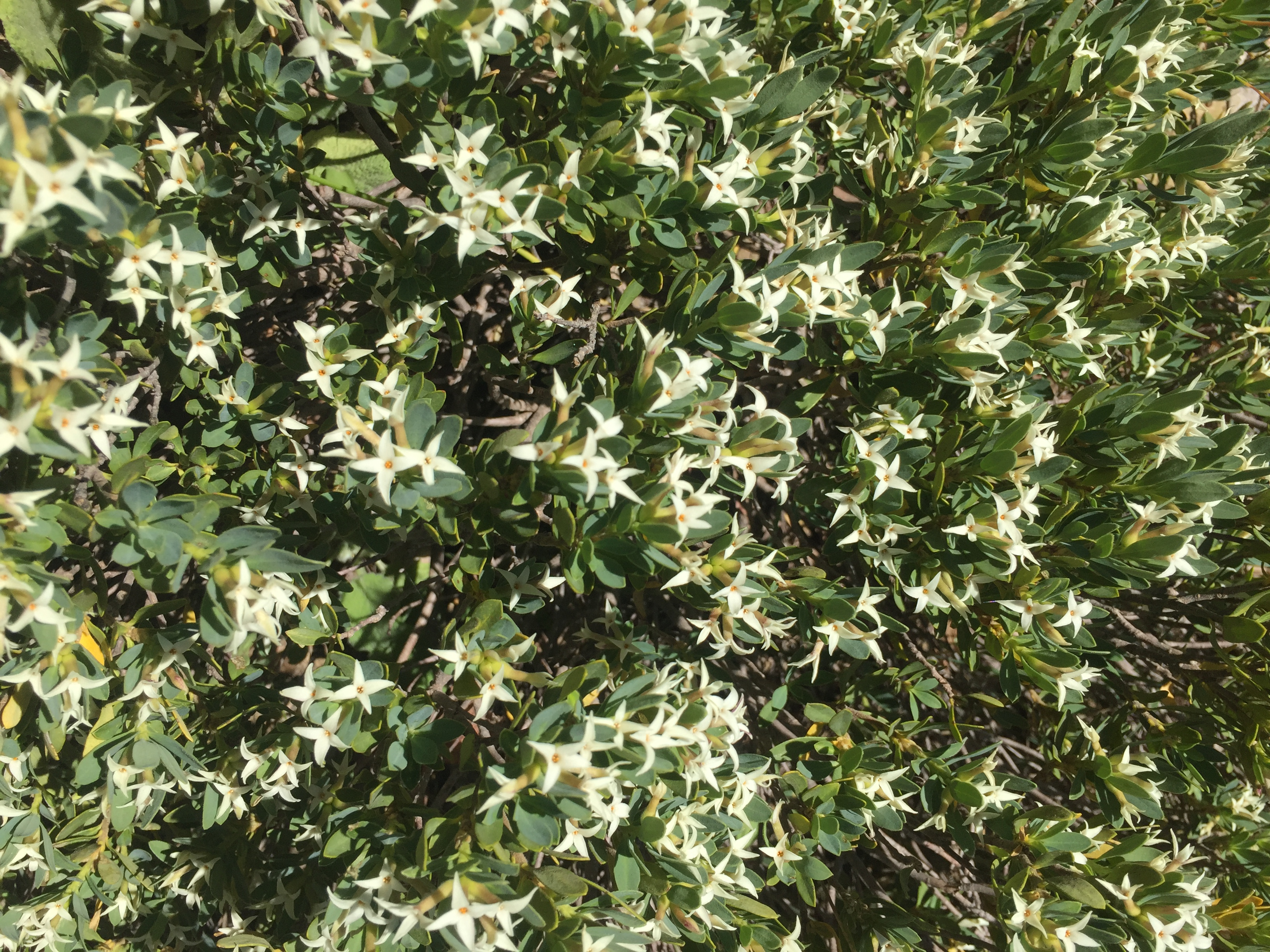
- Growing in Tannourine cedar reserve, Lebanon

Scientific classification
- Kingdom: Plantae
- Clade: Tracheophytes
- Clade: Angiosperms
- Clade: Eudicots
- Clade: Rosids
- Order: Malvales
- Family: Thymelaeaceae
- Genus: Daphne
- Species: D. oleoides

Binomial name
- Daphne oleoides Schreb.

Synonyms
- Of subsp. oleoides: List: Daphne buxifolia Vahl; Daphne buxifolia Sm., nom. illeg.; Daphne caucasica M.Bieb., nom. illeg.; Daphne euboica Rech.f.; Daphne glandulosa Bertol.; Daphne gnidioides Szov. ex Meisn.; Daphne hispanica Pau; Daphne hispanica var. granatensis Pau; Daphne jasminea Griseb., nom. illeg.; Daphne lucida Loisel.; Daphne oleoides var. atlantica Maire; Daphne oleoides subsp. atlantica (Maire) Rivas Mart., Molero Mesa, Marfíl & G.Benítez; Daphne oleoides var. brachyloba Meisn.; Daphne oleoides var. buxifolia (Vahl) Keissl.; Daphne oleoides var. glandulosa (Bertol.) Keissl.; Daphne oleoides var. granatensis (Pau) Font Quer; Daphne oleoides subsp. hispanica (Pau) Rivas Mart.; Daphne oleoides var. hispanica (Pau) Cuatrec.; Daphne oleoides var. jasminea Lázaro Ibiza, nom. illeg.; Daphne oleoides f. puberula (Jaub. & Spach) Keissl.; Daphne oleoides var. puberula Jaub. & Spach; Daphne sericea Noë ex Meisn.; Nemoctis angustifolia Raf.; Nemoctis buxifolia (Vahl) Raf.

= Daphne oleoides =

Olive daphne

Species of shrub

Daphne oleoides, known as olive daphne, is a shrub of the family Thymelaeaceae. It is native to southern Europe (Albania, Bulgaria, Corsica, Crete, mainland Greece, Italy, the northwest Balkans, Sardinia, Sicily, and Spain), northern Africa (Algeria), and Western Asia (Turkey and Lebanon-Syria).

== Description ==
The shrub is evergreen, and grows up to 60 cm tall. Its branches grow upright. Its flowers are white, with a purplish outside and it bears orange fruits. It is often found on calcareous rocks and rocky slopes at altitudes of 1,700 to 2,300 m.

== Subspecies ==
As of October 2025, Plants of the World Online accepted two subspecies:

- Daphne oleoides subsp. oleoides
- Daphne oleoides subsp. sardoa Camarda & Raimondo
