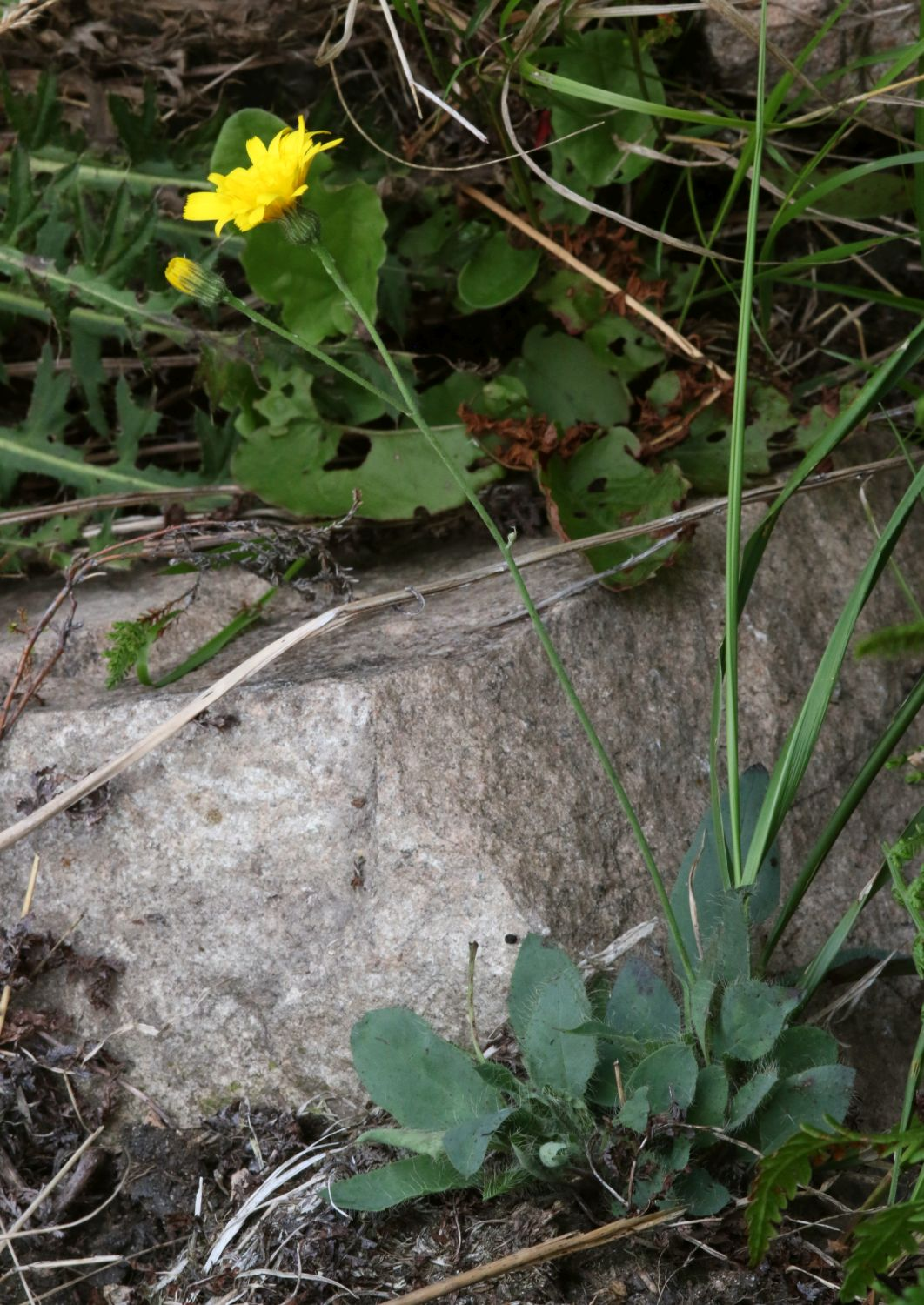

Scientific classification
- Kingdom: Plantae
- Clade: Tracheophytes
- Clade: Angiosperms
- Clade: Eudicots
- Clade: Asterids
- Order: Asterales
- Family: Asteraceae
- Genus: Hieracium
- Species: H. schmidtii

Binomial name
- Hieracium schmidtii Tausch

Subspecies
- List: Hieracium schmidtii subsp. acrocrocydotum (Zahn) Greuter; Hieracium schmidtii subsp. arcicola (Arv.-Touv.) O.Bolòs & Vigo; Hieracium schmidtii subsp. argaeum (Zahn) Greuter; Hieracium schmidtii subsp. argyrosericeum (O.Behr, E.Behr & Zahn) Greuter; Hieracium schmidtii subsp. balkanum (R.Uechtr. ex Pančić) Niketić; Hieracium schmidtii subsp. barbulatiforme (Zahn) O.Bolòs & Vigo; Hieracium schmidtii subsp. basicrinuloides (O.Behr, E.Behr & Zahn) Greuter; Hieracium schmidtii subsp. brachetianum (Arv.-Touv. & Gaut.) Gottschl.; Hieracium schmidtii subsp. brunelliforme (Arv.-Touv.) O.Bolòs & Vigo; Hieracium schmidtii subsp. catriae Gottschl.; Hieracium schmidtii subsp. cenomanicum (Zahn) Greuter; Hieracium schmidtii subsp. ceratodon (Arv.-Touv.) O.Bolòs & Vigo; Hieracium schmidtii subsp. ceratophylloides (Zahn) Gottschl.; Hieracium schmidtii subsp. cochleariforme Gottschl.; Hieracium schmidtii subsp. comatulum (Jord. ex Boreau) O.Bolòs & Vigo; Hieracium schmidtii subsp. comosulum (Arv.-Touv. & Gaut.) O.Bolòs & Vigo; Hieracium schmidtii subsp. creticum (Zahn) Greuter; Hieracium schmidtii subsp. crinitisquamum Gottschl.; Hieracium schmidtii subsp. curcicianum (Zahn) Greuter; Hieracium schmidtii subsp. cyaneum (Arv.-Touv.) O.Bolòs & Vigo; Hieracium schmidtii subsp. didymum Zahn; Hieracium schmidtii subsp. dinglerianum (Zahn) Greuter; Hieracium schmidtii subsp. diversifolium (Čelak.) Zahn; Hieracium schmidtii subsp. echinanthum (Arv.-Touv. & Gaut.) O.Bolòs & Vigo; Hieracium schmidtii subsp. euacrocydotum (Zahn) Greuter; Hieracium schmidtii subsp. floccosum (Arv.-Touv.) Gamisans & Jeanm.; Hieracium schmidtii subsp. floccozum (Zahn) Jeanm.; Hieracium schmidtii subsp. giresunense (Hub.-Mor.) Greuter; Hieracium schmidtii subsp. glaucopallens (Zahn) O.Bolòs & Vigo; Hieracium schmidtii subsp. graniticum (Sch.Bip.) Gottschl.; Hieracium schmidtii subsp. huber-morathii (P.D.Sell & C.West) Greuter; Hieracium schmidtii subsp. jovimontis (Zahn) Greuter; Hieracium schmidtii subsp. labillardierei (Arv.-Touv.) Greuter; Hieracium schmidtii subsp. lasiochaetum (Bornm. & Zahn) Greuter; Hieracium schmidtii subsp. lasiophyllum (W.D.J.Koch) O.Bolòs & Vigo; Hieracium schmidtii subsp. leucothecum (Freyn) Greuter; Hieracium schmidtii subsp. libanoticum (Boiss. & C.I.Blanche) Greuter; Hieracium schmidtii subsp. madoniense (Raimondo & Di Grist.) Greuter; Hieracium schmidtii subsp. marchettii Gottschl.; Hieracium schmidtii subsp. melaphyrogenes (Zahn) Gottschl.; Hieracium schmidtii subsp. nebrodense (Tineo) Di Grist., Gottschl. & Raimondo; Hieracium schmidtii subsp. odontotrichum (Freyn) Greuter; Hieracium schmidtii subsp. pallidiglaucinum (Zahn) Gottschl.; Hieracium schmidtii subsp. provinciale (Zahn) Greuter; Hieracium schmidtii subsp. pseudodontotrichum (Hub.-Mor.) Greuter; Hieracium schmidtii subsp. pseudorupicola (Wilczek & Zahn) Greuter; Hieracium schmidtii subsp. residuum Norrl.; Hieracium schmidtii subsp. rotenburgense (Bornm. & Zahn) Gottschl.; Hieracium schmidtii subsp. rupicola Zahn; Hieracium schmidtii subsp. rupicolifolium (Zahn) Greuter; Hieracium schmidtii subsp. samothracis (Ade & Schack) Gottschl.; Hieracium schmidtii subsp. schmidtii; Hieracium schmidtii subsp. schmidtiiforme (Zahn) O.Bolòs & Vigo; Hieracium schmidtii subsp. subcaesioides (Holle) Gottschl.; Hieracium schmidtii subsp. subcomatulum (Zahn) O.Bolòs & Vigo; Hieracium schmidtii subsp. subrupicola Zahn; Hieracium schmidtii subsp. subvandasii (Bornm. & Zahn) Greuter; Hieracium schmidtii subsp. trichellum (Arv.-Touv.) O.Bolòs & Vigo; Hieracium schmidtii subsp. trichocyaneum (Zahn) Gottschl. & Vogt; Hieracium schmidtii subsp. vranjanum (Zahn) Greuter; Hieracium schmidtii subsp. vulcanicum (Griseb.) Gottschl.; Hieracium schmidtii subsp. winkleri (Čelak.) Zahn

Synonyms
- Hieracium pallidum subsp. schmidtii (Tausch) Zahn, nom. illeg.

= Hieracium schmidtii =

Species of flowering plant

Hieracium schmidtii is a perennial species of flowering plant in the family Asteraceae, native to Europe, Lebanon-Syria, and Turkey. It was first described by Ignaz Friedrich Tausch in 1828. As of October 2024, Plants of the World Online accepted over 60 subspecies. Many of the subspecies have been treated as separate species; as one example Hieracium schmidtii subsp. graniticum has been treated as Hieracium graniticum and Hieracium sylvaticum.

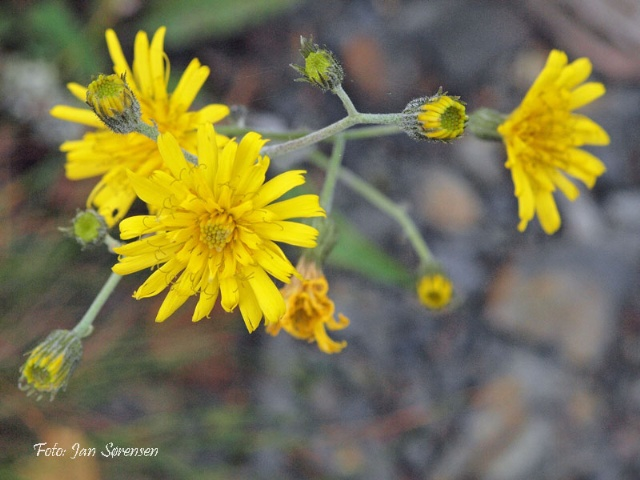
Flowers

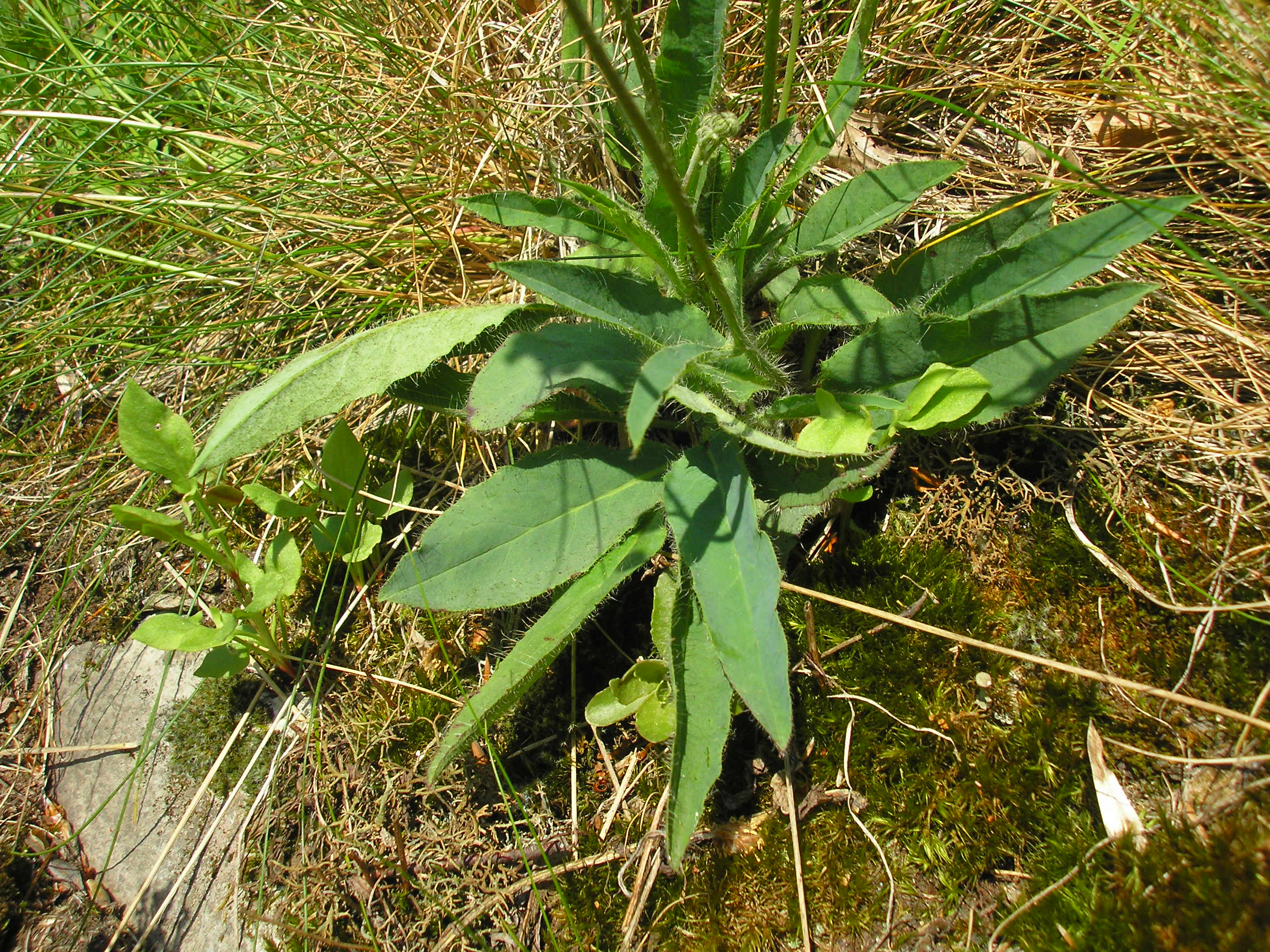
Basal leaves

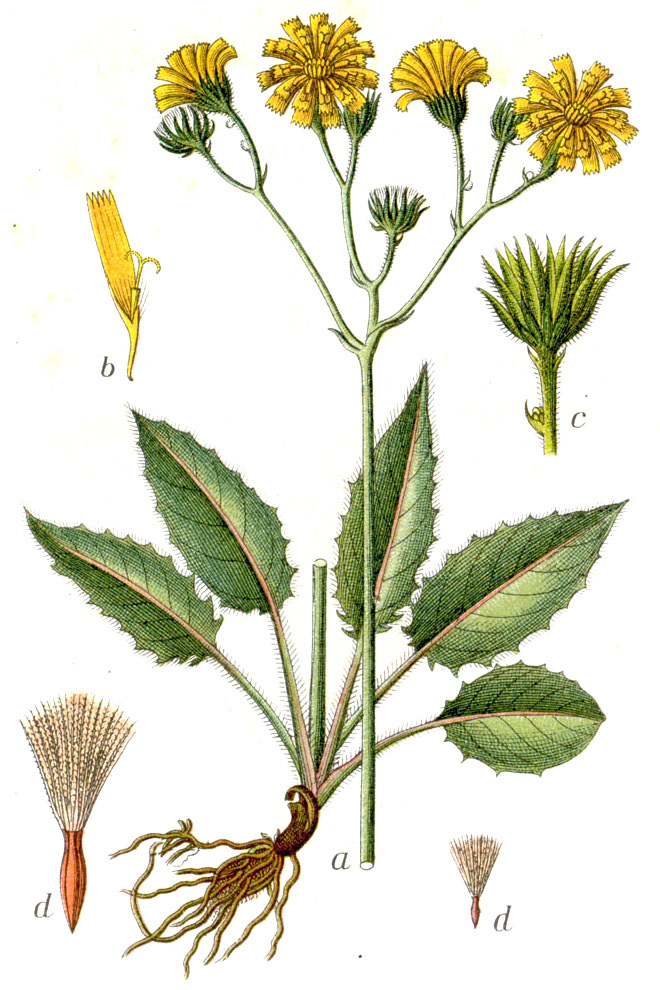
Illustration of H. schmidtii subsp. graniticum (as H. sylvaticum)
