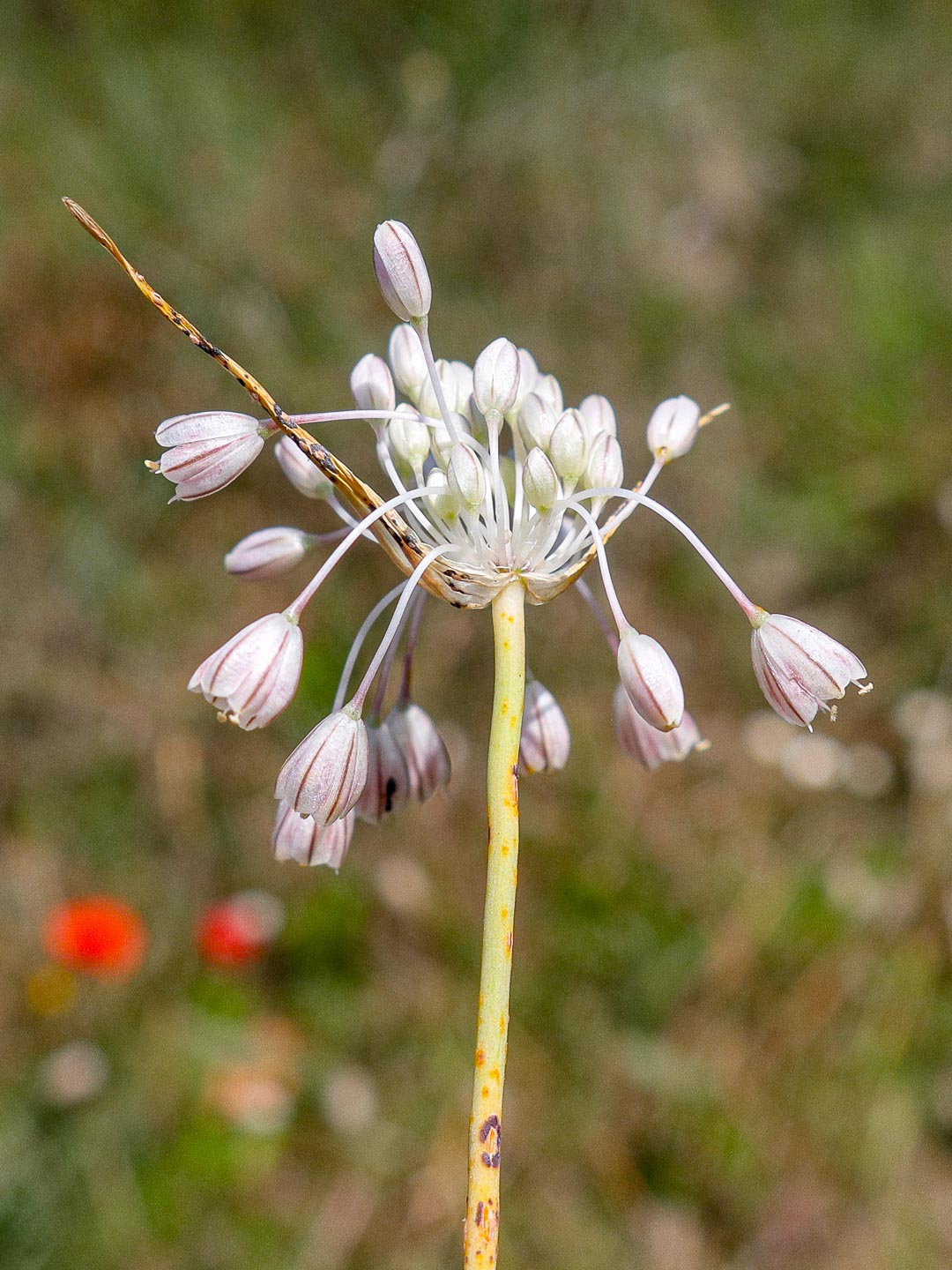

Scientific classification
- Kingdom: Plantae
- Clade: Tracheophytes
- Clade: Angiosperms
- Clade: Monocots
- Order: Asparagales
- Family: Amaryllidaceae
- Subfamily: Allioideae
- Genus: Allium
- Species: A. corsicum

Binomial name
- Allium corsicum Jauzein, J.-M.Tison, Deschâtres & H.Couderc

= Allium corsicum =

Species of flowering plant

Allium corsicum is a plant species endemic to the island of Corsica in the Mediterranean. It grows in low-elevation areas of the eastern part of the island, where it flowers in late spring.

Allium corsicum produces a spherical to egg-shaped bulb and a stipe up to 60 cm tall. Leaves are flat and hairless, about 3 mm wide. Umbel has many bell-shaped flowers, white or pink with dark purple midveins.
