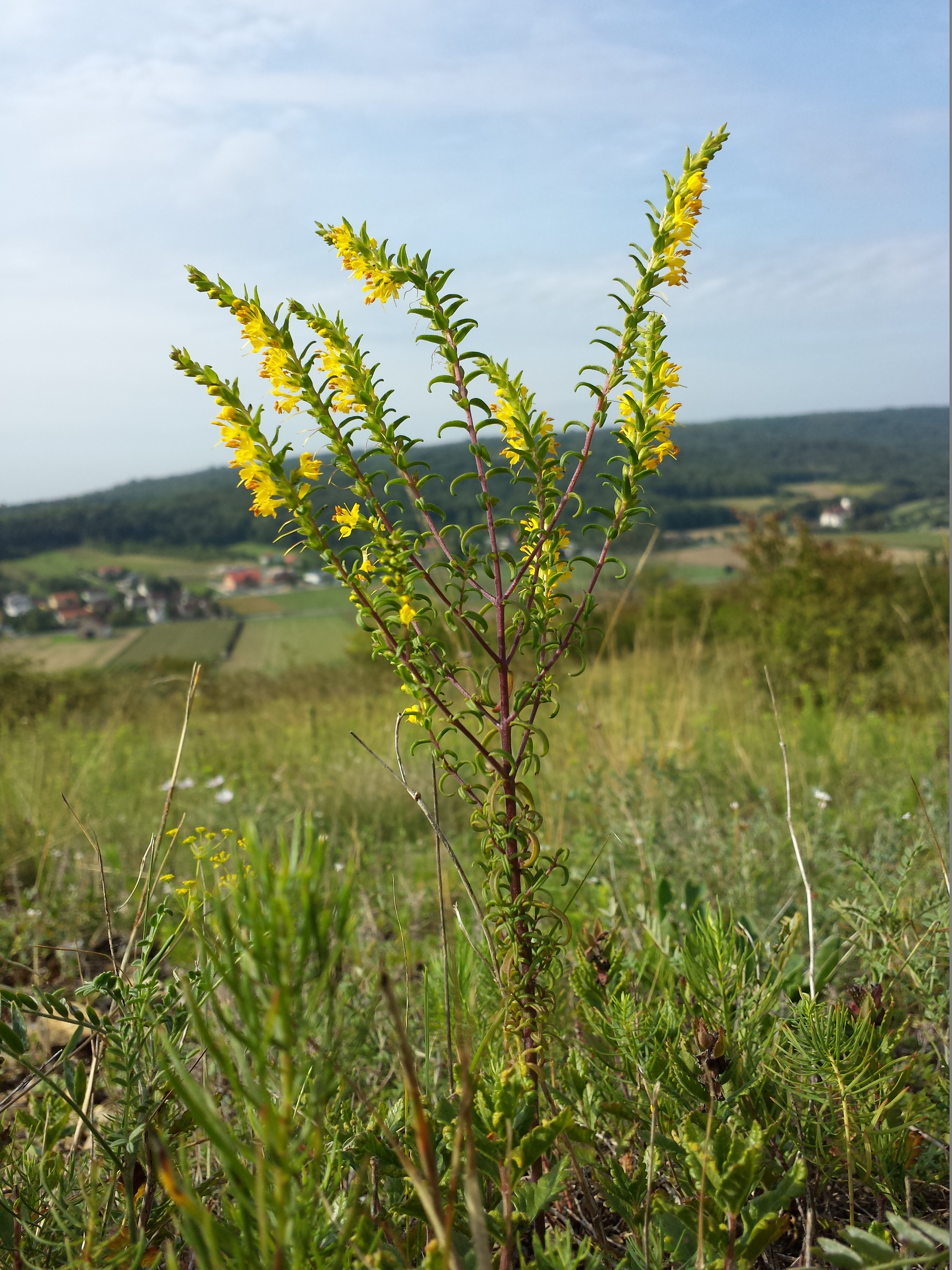
- General view of Odontites luteus

Scientific classification
- Kingdom: Plantae
- Clade: Embryophytes
- Clade: Tracheophytes
- Clade: Spermatophytes
- Clade: Angiosperms
- Clade: Eudicots
- Clade: Asterids
- Order: Lamiales
- Family: Orobanchaceae
- Genus: Odontites
- Species: O. luteus

Binomial name
- Odontites luteus (L.) Clairv.

= Odontites luteus =

Species of flowering plant in the broomrape family

Odontites luteus is a plant belonging to the genus Odontites in the family Orobanchaceae.

== Description ==
Odontites luteus is an annual plant, hemiparasite, 10 to 60 cm (3.9 to 24 in) high. The leaves are linear, narrow and generally entire.

The inflorescences are organized in unilateral clusters. The pubescent corolla, with ciliate-bearded margins, has a deep yellow color. The stamens are clearly prominent outside the corolla.

The number of chromosomes of this species is 2n = 20.

== Habitat and distribution ==
Odontites luteus is distributed in Europe and North Africa (subsp. reboudii). It grows in steppes, garrigues and in the edge of dry forests. It prefers moderately dry soils, usually limestone, poor in clay, but always in sunny exposure.

In Central Europe, this plant belongs to the Festuco-Brometea and Sedo-Scleranthetea classes.

== Systematics ==
Three subspecies have been described:

- Odontites luteus (L.) Clairv. subsp. luteus.
- Odontites luteus subsp. bonifaciensis (Rouy) P. Fourn. (Syn .: Euphrasia bonifaciensis Rouy): this subspecies is found in Corsica.
- Odontites luteus subsp.reboudii (Pomel) Quézel & Santa: this subspecies is found in Algeria.
