= Slavyanka (mountain) =

Mountain in southwestern Bulgaria and northern Greece

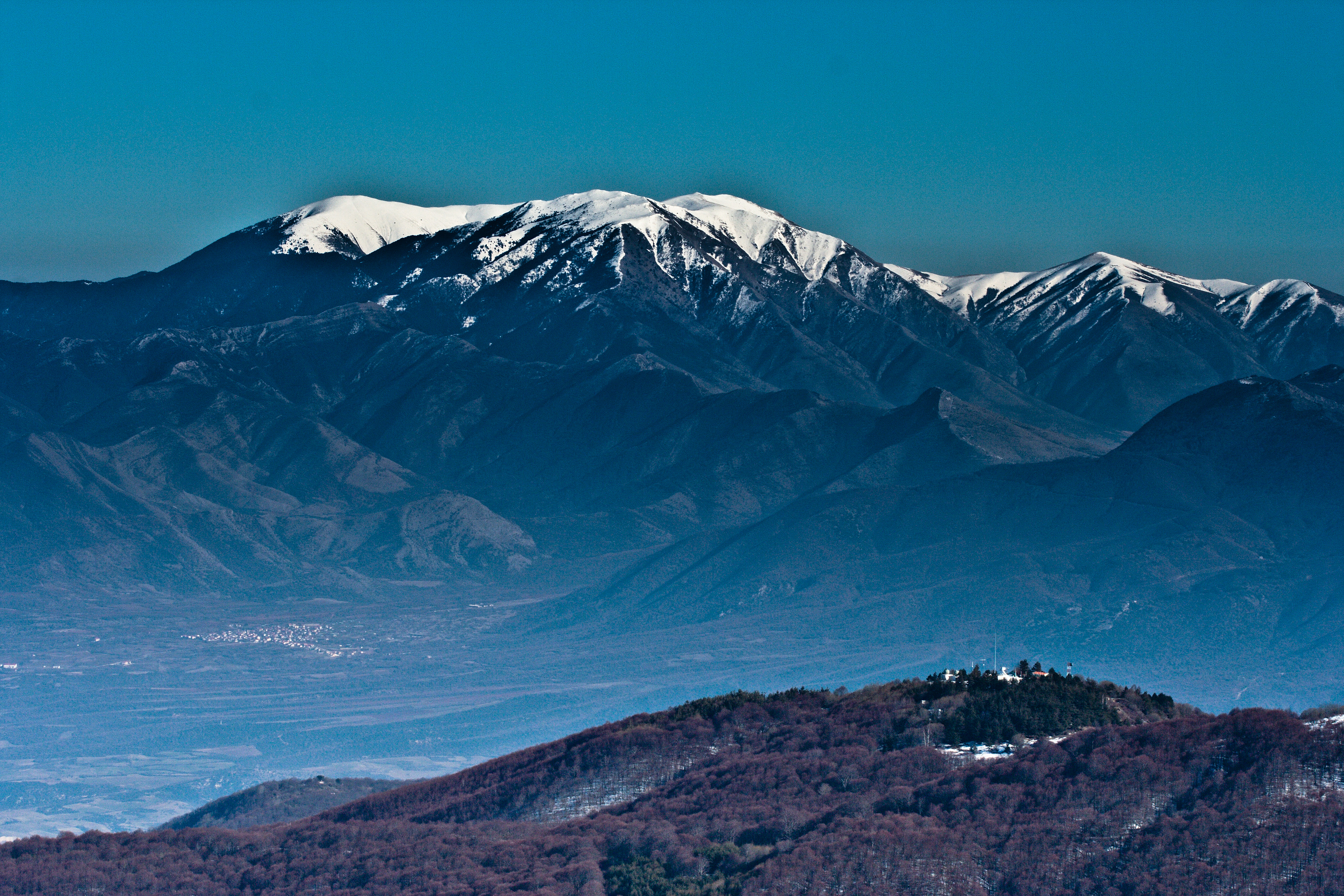
- Slavyanka, viewed from Mount Belasitsa

Highest point
- Peak: Gotsev Vrah
- Elevation: 2,212 m (7,257 ft)
- Prominence: 1,040 m (3,410 ft)
- Listing: Ribu

Naming
- Native name: Славянка (Bulgarian); Όρβηλος (Greek)

Geography
- Location within Balkans
- Countries: Bulgaria and Greece
- Range coordinates: 41°22′38″N 23°37′14″E

Slavyanka (Bulgarian: Славянка, "Slavic woman") or Orvilos (Greek: Όρβηλος), formerly known as Alibotush (from Turkish Alibotuş) and Kitka Planina (Китка планина), is a mountain located on the border of southwestern Bulgaria and northernmost Greece, located south of the Pirin Mountains and connected with it by the Paril Saddle. The highest peak of Slavyanka is Gotsev Vrah at 2,212 m, while other notable peaks include Golyam Tsarev Vrah (2,186 m), Malak Tsarev Vrah (2,087 m), Shabran (2,196 m) and Salyuva Dzhamiya (2,027 m). The Bulgarian section of the mountain is part of the Ali Botush Reserve.

The massif is dome-shaped and has very steep ridges. Slavyanka has a pronounced karst character and thus features over 30 caves, attracting many speleologists. The climate has a considerable Mediterranean influence, with precipitation being at its highest in the autumn and winter and at its lowest in the summer, and the average temperatures being higher than in the rest of the country at this height. The average annual temperature in the lowest part of the mountain is almost 14°C and about 6 °C in the highest part.

Slavyanka has a rich flora, with more than 1,700 vascular plants, including 20 Bulgarian endemic species and five that can be found nowhere else in the country. The low part of the mountain is rich in European Black Pine, while the Bosnian Pine grows at over 1,800 m above sea level, making Slavyanka the place with the highest concentration of the species in the Balkans. The fauna is represented not only by typical species for Bulgaria such as the deer, Wild Boar, hare, fox and badger, but also by characteristically Mediterranean animals like the jackal, the rare European Cat Snake, several species of tortoises and lizards, etc. There have been found 44 species of terrestrial gastropods in the Bulgarian part of the Alibotush Mountains. Twenty-four species of these terrestrial gastropods have Mediterranean type of distribution.
