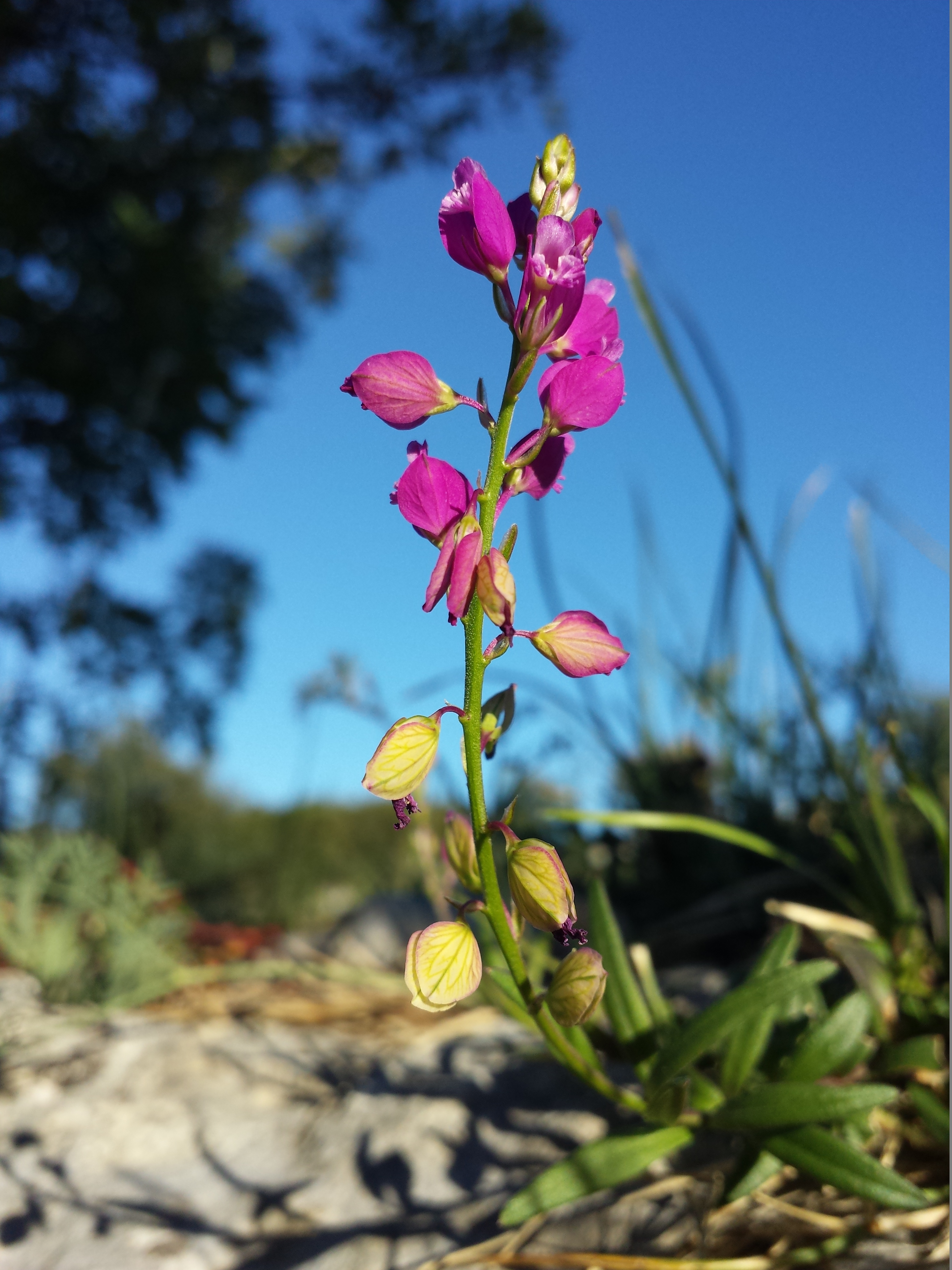

Scientific classification
- Kingdom: Plantae
- Clade: Tracheophytes
- Clade: Angiosperms
- Clade: Eudicots
- Clade: Rosids
- Order: Fabales
- Family: Polygalaceae
- Genus: Polygala
- Species: P. nicaeensis

Binomial name
- Polygala nicaeensis Risso ex W.D.J.Koch

Synonyms
- Polygala amblyptera var. nicaeensis (Risso ex W.D.J.Koch) Steud.; Polygala rosea var. nicaeensis (Risso ex W.D.J.Koch) Nyman; Polygala rosea subsp. nicaeensis (Risso ex W.D.J.Koch) Gand.; Polygala vulgaris subsp. nicaeensis (Risso ex W.D.J.Koch) Rouy; Polygala vulgaris lusus nicaeensis (Risso ex W.D.J.Koch) Regel; Polygala vulgaris var. nicaeensis (Risso ex W.D.J.Koch) Paol.

= Polygala nicaeensis =

Species of flowering plant

Polygala nicaeensis is a species of flowering plant in the milkwort family (Polygalaceae). It is a perennial native to southern Europe, from Spain to Greece and Bulgaria, and to northwestern Africa.

== Subspecies ==
Nine subspecies are accepted:

- Polygala nicaeensis subsp. caesalpini (Bubani) McNeil – southern France and northeastern Spain
- Polygala nicaeensis subsp. corsica (Boreau) P.Graebn. – Corsica
- Polygala nicaeensis subsp. gariodiana (Jord. & Fourr.) Chodat – southeastern France and northwestern Italy
- Polygala nicaeensis subsp. gerundensis (O.Bolòs & Vigo) Mateo & M.B.Crespo – Spain
- Polygala nicaeensis subsp. italiana (Chodat) Arrigoni – Italy
- Polygala nicaeensis subsp. mediterranea Chodat – northwestern Africa, Italy, former Yugoslavia, Albania, Bulgaria, Greece, and the East Aegean Islands
- Polygala nicaeensis subsp. nicaeensis – southeastern France and northwestern Italy
- Polygala nicaeensis subsp. peninsularis Arrigoni – Italy
- Polygala nicaeensis subsp. tomentella (Boiss.) Chodat – Greece
