= List of Asteraceae of Great Britain and Ireland =

List of the vascular plants of Britain and Ireland #7 — this page's list covers the dicotyledon family Asteraceae.

Status key: * indicates an introduced species and e indicates an extinct species.

== Asteraceae species ==
English name	Scientific name	Status
Glandular globe-thistle	Echinops sphaerocephalus	*
Globethistle	Echinops exaltatus	*
Blue globe-thistle	Echinops bannaticus	*
Carline thistle	Carlina vulgaris	
Greater burdock	Arctium lappa	
Lesser burdock	Arctium minus	
Alpine saw-wort	Saussurea alpina	
Slender thistle	Carduus tenuiflorus	
Plymouth thistle	Carduus pycnocephalus	*
Welted thistle	Carduus crispus	
Musk thistle	Carduus nutans	
Woolly thistle	Cirsium eriophorum	
Spear thistle	Cirsium vulgare	
Meadow thistle	Cirsium dissectum	
Tuberous thistle	Cirsium tuberosum	
Yellow thistle	Cirsium erisithales	*
Melancholy thistle	Cirsium heterophyllum	
Cabbage thistle	Cirsium oleraceum	*
Dwarf thistle	Cirsium acaule	
Marsh thistle	Cirsium palustre	
Creeping thistle	Cirsium arvense	
Cotton thistle	Onopordum acanthium	
Blessed milk thistle	Silybum marianum	*
Saw-wort	Serratula tinctoria	
Russian knapweed	Acroptilon repens	*
Greater knapweed	Centaurea scabiosa	
Perennial cornflower	Centaurea montana	*
Cornflower	Centaurea cyanus	*
Red star-thistle	Centaurea calcitrapa	*
Rough star-thistle	Centaurea aspera	*
Yellow star-thistle	Centaurea solstitialis	*
Common knapweed	Centaurea nigra	
Chicory	Cichorium intybus	
Lamb's succory	Arnoseris minima	e
Nipplewort	Lapsana communis	
Cat's-ear	Hypochaeris radicata	
Smooth cat's-ear	Hypochaeris glabra	
Spotted cat's-ear	Hypochaeris maculata	
Autumn hawkbit	Leontodon autumnalis	
Rough hawkbit	Leontodon hispidus	
Lesser hawkbit	Leontodon saxatilis	
Bristly oxtongue	Picris echioides	
Hawkweed oxtongue	Picris hieracioides	
Viper's-grass	Scorzonera humilis	
Goat's-beard	Tragopogon pratensis	
Salsify	Tragopogon porrifolius	*
Tuberous hawk's-beard	Aetheorhiza bulbosa	*
Marsh sow-thistle	Sonchus palustris	
Perennial sow-thistle	Sonchus arvensis	
Smooth sow-thistle	Sonchus oleraceus	
Prickly sow-thistle	Sonchus asper	
Prickly lettuce	Lactuca serriola	
Great lettuce	Lactuca virosa	
Least lettuce	Lactuca saligna	
Blue lettuce	Lactuca tatarica	*
Alpine blue-sow-thistle	Cicerbita alpina	
Common blue-sow-thistle	Lactuca macrophylla	*
Hairless blue-sow-thistle	Cicerbita plumieri	*
Pontic blue-sow-thistle	Cicerbita bourgaei	*
Wall lettuce	Mycelis muralis	
A dandelion	Taraxacum acutum	
A dandelion	Taraxacum arenastrum	
A dandelion	Taraxacum argutum	
A dandelion	Taraxacum brachyglossum	
A dandelion	Taraxacum cenabense	
A dandelion	Taraxacum commixtum	
A dandelion	Taraxacum degelii	
A dandelion	Taraxacum disseminatum	
A dandelion	Taraxacum dunense	
A dandelion	Taraxacum falcatum	
A dandelion	Taraxacum fulviforme	
A dandelion	Taraxacum fulvum	
A dandelion	Taraxacum glauciniforme	
A dandelion	Taraxacum inopinatum	
A dandelion	Taraxacum lacistophyllum	
A dandelion	Taraxacum oxoniense	
A dandelion	Taraxacum placidum	
A dandelion	Taraxacum proximiforme	
A dandelion	Taraxacum proximum	
A dandelion	Taraxacum pseudoproximum	
A dandelion	Taraxacum retzii	
A dandelion	Taraxacum rubicundum	
A dandelion	Taraxacum scanicum	
A dandelion	Taraxacum scoticum	
A dandelion	Taraxacum parnassicum	
A dandelion	Taraxacum tanylepis	
A dandelion	Taraxacum tortilobum	
A dandelion	Taraxacum wallonicum	
A dandelion	Taraxacum obliquum	
A dandelion	Taraxacum platyglossum	
A dandelion	Taraxacum anglicum	
A dandelion	Taraxacum palustre	
A dandelion	Taraxacum sarniense	
A dandelion	Taraxacum webbii	
A dandelion	Taraxacum faeroense	
A dandelion	Taraxacum serpenticola	
A dandelion	Taraxacum cornubiense	
A dandelion	Taraxacum drucei	
A dandelion	Taraxacum euryphyllum	
A dandelion	Taraxacum maculosum	
A dandelion	Taraxacum naevosiforme	
A dandelion	Taraxacum naevosum	
A dandelion	Taraxacum pseudolarssonii	
Richard's dandelion	Taraxacum richardsianum	
A dandelion	Taraxacum stictophyllum	
A dandelion	Taraxacum subnaevosum	
A dandelion	Taraxacum ceratolobum	
A dandelion	Taraxacum clovense	
A dandelion	Taraxacum craspedotum	
A dandelion	Taraxacum cymbifolium	
A dandelion	Taraxacum pycnostictum	
A dandelion	Taraxacum xiphoideum	
A dandelion	Taraxacum beeftinkii	
A dandelion	Taraxacum berthae	
A dandelion	Taraxacum bracteatum	
A dandelion	Taraxacum brittanicum	
A dandelion	Taraxacum caledonicum	
A dandelion	Taraxacum cambricum	
A dandelion	Taraxacum celticum	
A dandelion	Taraxacum duplidentifrons	
A dandelion	Taraxacum excellens	
A dandelion	Taraxacum fulgidum	
A dandelion	Taraxacum fulvicarpum	
A dandelion	Taraxacum gelertii	
A dandelion	Taraxacum haematicum	
A dandelion	Taraxacum hesperium	
A dandelion	Taraxacum hygrophilum	
A dandelion	Taraxacum inane	
A dandelion	Taraxacum lancastriense	
A dandelion	Taraxacum landmarkii	
A dandelion	Taraxacum luteum	
A dandelion	Taraxacum nordstedtii	
A dandelion	Taraxacum oellgaardii	
A dandelion	Taraxacum olgae	
A dandelion	Taraxacum orcadense	
A dandelion	Taraxacum ostenfeldii	
A dandelion	Taraxacum palustrisquameum	
A dandelion	Taraxacum porteri	
A dandelion	Taraxacum pseudonordstedtii	
A dandelion	Taraxacum subbracteatum	
A dandelion	Taraxacum tamesense	
A dandelion	Taraxacum texelense	
A dandelion	Taraxacum unguilobum	
A dandelion	Taraxacum atactum	
A dandelion	Taraxacum boekmanii	
A dandelion	Taraxacum fusciflorum	
A dandelion	Taraxacum hamatiforme	
A dandelion	Taraxacum hamatulum	
A dandelion	Taraxacum hamatum	
A dandelion	Taraxacum hamiferum	
A dandelion	Taraxacum kernianum	
A dandelion	Taraxacum lamprophyllum	
A dandelion	Taraxacum lancidens	
A dandelion	Taraxacum marklundii	
A dandelion	Taraxacum prionum	
A dandelion	Taraxacum pruinatum	
false hook-lobed dandelion	Taraxacum pseudohamatum	
A dandelion	Taraxacum quadrans	
A dandelion	Taraxacum spiculatum	
A dandelion	Taraxacum subhamatum	
Apiculate-lobed dandelion	Taraxacum aberrans	
Broad-bracted dandelion	Taraxacum acroglossum	
A dandelion	Taraxacum acutifidum	
A dandelion	Taraxacum acutifrons	
Twisted-bracted dandelion	Taraxacum aequilobum	
Equal-lobed dandelion	Taraxacum aequisectum	
A dandelion	Taraxacum alatum	
Tall dandelion	Taraxacum altissimum	
Toothed dandelion	Taraxacum amplum	
A dandelion	Taraxacum ancistrolobum	
A dandelion	Taraxacum angulare	
Multi-lobed dandelion	Taraxacum angustisquameum	
A dandelion	Taraxacum atonolobum	
Tailed dandelion	Taraxacum aurosulum	
Beautiful-stalked dandelion	Taraxacum caloschistum	
Cherwell dandelion	Taraxacum cherwellense	
Spikey-leaved dandelion	Taraxacum chloroticum	
A dandelion	Taraxacum chrysophaenum	
Round-lobed dandelion	Taraxacum cophocentrum	
Entire-lobed dandelion	Taraxacum cordatum	
A dandelion	Taraxacum corynodes	
A dandelion	Taraxacum croceiflorum	
Variable leafed dandelion	Taraxacum curtifrons	
Bluish-bracted dandelion	Taraxacum cyanolepis	
A dandelion	Taraxacum dahlstedtii	
A dandelion	Taraxacum densilobum	
Bulbous-lobed dandelion	Taraxacum diastematicum	
A dandelion	Taraxacum dilaceratum	
Grassland dandelion	Taraxacum dilatatum	
Ekman's dandelion	Taraxacum ekmanii	
Imbricate-bracted dandelion	Taraxacum exacutum	
A dandelion	Taraxacum expallidiforme	
Erect-bracted dandelion	Taraxacum exsertiforme	
Pale-green dandelion	Taraxacum exsertum	
Fagerströem's dandelion	Taraxacum fagerstroemii	
A dandelion	Taraxacum fasciatum	
Pretty-leaved dandelion	Taraxacum adiantifrons	
Hexham dandelion	Taraxacum hexhamense	
A dandelion	Taraxacum horridifrons	
A dandelion	Taraxacum huelphersianum	
Incise-leaved dandelion	Taraxacum incisum	
A dandelion	Taraxacum insigne	
City dandelion	Taraxacum interveniens	
A dandelion	Taraxacum intumescens	
A dandelion	Taraxacum lacerifolium	
A dandelion	Taraxacum laciniosifrons	
A dandelion	Taraxacum laciniosum	
A dandelion	Taraxacum laeticolor	
A dandelion	Taraxacum laticordatum	
A dandelion	Taraxacum latisectum	
Broad-leaved dandelion	Taraxacum latissimum	
A dandelion	Taraxacum leptodon	
White-Stalked dandelion	Taraxacum leucopodum	
A dandelion	Taraxacum lingulatum	
Elongate-bracted dandelion	Taraxacum longisquameum	
A dandelion	Taraxacum lucidum	
Lunar-lobed dandelion	Taraxacum lunare	
A dandelion	Taraxacum macranthoides	
A dandelion	Taraxacum macrolobum	
Yellowish-Green dandelion	Taraxacum maculatum	
A dandelion	Taraxacum margettsii	
A dandelion	Taraxacum melanthoides	
Sharp-lobed dandelion	Taraxacum mimulum	
Many-coloured dandelion	Taraxacum multicolorans	
A dandelion	Taraxacum necessarium	
Shining dandelion	Taraxacum nitidum	
A dandelion	Taraxacum obliquilobum	
Oblong-leaved dandelion	Taraxacum oblongatum	
A dandelion	Taraxacum obtusifrons	
Blunt-lobed dandelion	Taraxacum obtusilobum	
Winged dandelion	Taraxacum ochrochlorum	
A dandelion	Taraxacum pachylobum	
Dirty-leaved dandelion	Taraxacum pachymerum	
A dandelion	Taraxacum pallescens	
A dandelion	Taraxacum pallidipes	
A dandelion	Taraxacum pannucium	
A dandelion	Taraxacum pannulatiforme	
Leaden-bracted dandelion	Taraxacum pannulatum	
Pectinate-leaved dandelion	Taraxacum pectinatiforme	
A dandelion	Taraxacum piceatum	
Diverse-leaved dandelion	Taraxacum planum	
Common dandelion	Taraxacum polyodon	
Hump-lobed dandelion	Taraxacum porrigens	
A dandelion	Taraxacum procerisquameum	
Spur-lobed dandelion	Taraxacum pseudoretroflexum	
Beautiful-leaved dandelion	Taraxacum pulchrifolium	
Falcate-lobed dandelion	Taraxacum remanentilobum	
Reflexed-lobed dandelion	Taraxacum retroflexum	
A dandelion	Taraxacum rhamphodes	
Smooth dandelion	Taraxacum sagittipotens	
Deltoid-lobed dandelion	Taraxacum scotiniforme	
A dandelion	Taraxacum sellandii	
Hairy-ribbed dandelion	Taraxacum semiglobosum	
A dandelion	Taraxacum sinuatum	
Massive dandelion	Taraxacum speciosum	
A dandelion	Taraxacum stenacrum	
Hairy-stalked dandelion	Taraxacum stereodes	
A dandelion	Taraxacum subcyanolepis	
A dandelion	Taraxacum subexpallidum	
A dandelion	Taraxacum subhuelphersianum	
A dandelion	Taraxacum sublaeticolor	
Roadside dandelion	Taraxacum sublongisquameum	
A dandelion	Taraxacum lepidum	
Complex-leaved dandelion	Taraxacum subundulatum	
A dandelion	Taraxacum subxanthostigma	
A dandelion	Taraxacum tanyphyllum	
A dandelion	Taraxacum tenebricans	
Three-lobed dandelion	Taraxacum trilobatum	
A dandelion	Taraxacum tumentilobum	
Dull-leaved dandelion	Taraxacum undulatiflorum	
A dandelion	Taraxacum undulatum	
Reflexed-bracted dandelion	Taraxacum valens	
A dandelion	Taraxacum vastisectum	
Ochre-styled dandelion	Taraxacum xanthostigma	
Marsh hawk's-beard	Crepis paludosa	
Northern hawk's-beard	Crepis mollis	
Rough hawk's-beard	Crepis biennis	
Smooth hawk's-beard	Crepis capillaris	
Beaked hawk's-beard	Crepis vesicaria	*
Stinking hawk's-beard	Crepis foetida	
Leafless hawk's-beard	Crepis praemorsa	*
Shaggy mouse-ear hawkweed	Pilosella peleteriana	
Mouse-ear hawkweed	Pilosella officinarum	
Shetland mouse-ear hawkweed	Pilosella flagellaris	
Tall mouse-ear hawkweed	Pilosella praealta	*
Yellow fox-and-cubs	Pilosella caespitosa	*
Fox-and-cubs	Pilosella aurantiaca	*
New England hawkweed	Hieracium sabaudum	
A hawkweed	Hieracium virgultorum	
A hawkweed	Hieracium rigens	
A hawkweed	Hieracium salticola	
Canadian hawkweed	Hieracium canadense	
A hawkweed	Hieracium maritimum	
A hawkweed	Hieracium pycnotrichum	e
A hawkweed	Hieracium bakerianum	
A hawkweed	Hieracium subumbellatiforme	
A hawkweed	Hieracium reticulatum	
A hawkweed	Hieracium strictiforme	
A hawkweed	Hieracium drummondii	
A hawkweed	Hieracium subcrocatum	
A hawkweed	Hieracium latobrigorum	
A hawkweed	Hieracium tavense	
A hawkweed	Hieracium calcaricola	
A hawkweed	Hieracium ornatilorum	
A hawkweed	Hieracium eboracense	
A hawkweed	Hieracium cambricogothicum	
A hawkweed	Hieracium trichocaulon	
A hawkweed	Hieracium acamptum	
A hawkweed	Hieracium cantianum	
A hawkweed	Hieracium scabrisetum	
A hawkweed	Hieracium stewartii	
A hawkweed	Hieracium scullyi	
A hawkweed	Hieracium nidense	
A hawkweed	Hieracium subintegrifolium	
A hawkweed	Hieracium placerophylloides	
A hawkweed	Hieracium substrigosum	
A hawkweed	Hieracium gothicoides	
A hawkweed	Hieracium uiginskyense	
Smooth hawkweed	Hieracium laevigatum	
A hawkweed	Hieracium sparsifolium	
A hawkweed	Hieracium hibernicum	
A hawkweed	Hieracium sparsifrons	
A hawkweed	Hieracium linguans	
A hawkweed	Hieracium borreri	e
A hawkweed	Hieracium carpathicum	
A hawkweed	Hieracium dewarii	
A hawkweed	Hieracium mirandum	
A hawkweed	Hieracium vinicaule	
A hawkweed	Hieracium northroense	
A hawkweed	Hieracium subtruncatum	
A hawkweed	Hieracium dilectum	
A hawkweed	Hieracium pugsleyi	
A hawkweed	Hieracium attenuatifolium	
A hawkweed	Hieracium hethlandiae	e
A hawkweed	Hieracium praethulense	
A hawkweed	Hieracium dovrense	
A hawkweed	Hieracium australius	
A hawkweed	Hieracium difficile	
A hawkweed	Hieracium gratum	
A hawkweed	Hieracium solum	
A hawkweed	Hieracium breve	
A hawkweed	Hieracium zetlandicum	
A hawkweed	Hieracium pollichiae	
A hawkweed	Hieracium caesionigrescens	
A hawkweed	Hieracium cravoniense	
A hawkweed	Hieracium triviale	
Yellow hawkweed	Hieracium lachenalii	
A hawkweed	Hieracium rubiginosum	
A hawkweed	Hieracium subramosum	e
A hawkweed	Hieracium lepidulum	
A hawkweed	Hieracium surrejanum	
A hawkweed	Hieracium subamplifolium	
A hawkweed	Hieracium diaphanoides	
A hawkweed	Hieracium subminutidens	
A hawkweed	Hieracium diaphanum	
A hawkweed	Hieracium glanduliceps	
Spotted hawkweed	Hieracium maculatum	
A hawkweed	Hieracium pulchrius	
A hawkweed	Hieracium rectulum	
A hawkweed	Hieracium submutabile	
A hawkweed	Hieracium orcadense	
A hawkweed	Hieracium oxyodus	
A hawkweed	Hieracium maculoides	
A hawkweed	Hieracium fulvocaesium	
A hawkweed	Hieracium stenophyes	
A hawkweed	Hieracium caesiomurorum	
A hawkweed	Hieracium rhomboides	
A hawkweed	Hieracium dipteroides	
Radyr hawkweed	Hieracium radyrense	
A hawkweed	Hieracium cuneifrons	
A hawkweed	Hieracium breadalbanense	
A hawkweed	Hieracium uisticola	
A hawkweed	Hieracium orithales	
A hawkweed	Hieracium oistophyllum	
A hawkweed	Hieracium silvaticoides	
A hawkweed	Hieracium neocoracinum	
A hawkweed	Hieracium subhirtum	
A hawkweed	Hieracium subtenue	
A hawkweed	Hieracium aggregatum	
A hawkweed	Hieracium anguinum	
A hawkweed	Hieracium variifolium	
A hawkweed	Hieracium pauculidens	
A hawkweed	Hieracium mucronellum	
A hawkweed	Hieracium maculosum	
A hawkweed	Hieracium auratiflorum	
A hawkweed	Hieracium crebridentiforme	
A hawkweed	Hieracium rivale	
A hawkweed	Hieracium pachyphylloides	
A hawkweed	Hieracium sanguineum	
A hawkweed	Hieracium pseudosarcophyllum	
A hawkweed	Hieracium pseudostenstroemii	
A hawkweed	Hieracium cymbifolium	
A hawkweed	Hieracium piligerum	
A hawkweed	Hieracium pollinarioides	
A hawkweed	Hieracium pictorum	
A hawkweed	Hieracium gougetianum	*
A hawkweed	Hieracium zygophorum	*
A hawkweed	Hieracium scotostictum	*
A hawkweed	Hieracium duriceps	
A hawkweed	Hieracium asteridiophyllum	
A hawkweed	Hieracium discophyllum	
Leek-coloured hawkweed	Hieracium subprasinifolium	
A hawkweed	Hieracium prolixum	
A hawkweed	Hieracium itunense	
A hawkweed	Hieracium pollinarium	
A hawkweed	Hieracium stenstroemii	
A hawkweed	Hieracium candelabrae	
A hawkweed	Hieracium uistense	
A hawkweed	Hieracium pruinale	
Snowdonia hawkweed	Hieracium snowdoniense	
A hawkweed	Hieracium camptopetalum	
A hawkweed	Hieracium pellucidum	
A hawkweed	Hieracium hjeltii	*
A hawkweed	Hieracium integratum	
A hawkweed	Hieracium oblongum	*
A hawkweed	Hieracium subcrassum	
A hawkweed	Hieracium patale	*
A hawkweed	Hieracium cinderella	
A hawkweed	Hieracium sublepistoides	
A hawkweed	Hieracium severiceps	*
A hawkweed	Hieracium grandidens	*
A hawkweed	Hieracium cardiophyllum	*
A hawkweed	Hieracium exotericum	
A hawkweed	Hieracium chloranthum	
A hawkweed	Hieracium orimeles	
A hawkweed	Hieracium subrude	
A hawkweed	Hieracium proximum	
A hawkweed	Hieracium scoticum	
A hawkweed	Hieracium angustisquamum	
A hawkweed	Hieracium caledonicum	
A hawkweed	Hieracium holophyllum	
A hawkweed	Hieracium leyanum	
A hawkweed	Hieracium angustatiforme	
A hawkweed	Hieracium cacuminum	
A hawkweed	Hieracium angustatum	
A hawkweed	Hieracium argenteum	
A hawkweed	Hieracium vagense	
A hawkweed	Hieracium cambricum	
A hawkweed	Hieracium sommerfeltii	
A hawkweed	Hieracium carneddorum	
A hawkweed	Hieracium pseudoleyi	
A hawkweed	Hieracium decolor	
A hawkweed	Hieracium cyathis	
A hawkweed	Hieracium leyi	
A hawkweed	Hieracium jovimontis	
A hawkweed	Hieracium nitidum	
A hawkweed	Hieracium cillense	
A hawkweed	Hieracium lasiophyllum	
A hawkweed	Hieracium brigantum	
A hawkweed	Hieracium schmidtii	
A hawkweed	Hieracium hypochaeroides	
A hawkweed	Hieracium repandulare	
A hawkweed	Hieracium riddelsdellii	
A hawkweed	Hieracium ebudicum	
A hawkweed	Hieracium eucallum	
A hawkweed	Hieracium saxorum	
A hawkweed	Hieracium subplanifolium	
A hawkweed	Hieracium basalticola	
A hawkweed	Hieracium dicella	
A hawkweed	Hieracium sarcophylloides	
A hawkweed	Hieracium fratrum	
A hawkweed	Hieracium britannicum	
A hawkweed	Hieracium britanniciforme	
Derby hawkweed	Hieracium naviense	
A hawkweed	Hieracium subbritannicum	
A hawkweed	Hieracium stenolepiforme	
A hawkweed	Hieracium stenopholidium	
A hawkweed	Hieracium eustomon	
A hawkweed	Hieracium speluncarum	*
A hawkweed	Hieracium pulmonarioides	*
Sticky hawkweed	Hieracium amplexicaule	*
A hawkweed	Hieracium scarpicum	
A hawkweed	Hieracium magniceps	
A hawkweed	Hieracium iricum	
A hawkweed	Hieracium anglicum	
A hawkweed	Hieracium hartii	
A hawkweed	Hieracium langwellense	
A hawkweed	Hieracium ampliatum	
A hawkweed	Hieracium hebridense	
A hawkweed	Hieracium flocculosum	
A hawkweed	Hieracium shoolbredii	
A hawkweed	Hieracium pseudanglicoides	
A hawkweed	Hieracium pseudanglicum	
A hawkweed	Hieracium cumbriense	
A hawkweed	Hieracium petrocharis	
A hawkweed	Hieracium dasythrix	
A hawkweed	Hieracium laetificum	
A hawkweed	Hieracium gracilifolium	
A hawkweed	Hieracium chrysolorum	
A hawkweed	Hieracium clovense	
A hawkweed	Hieracium melanochloricephalum	
A hawkweed	Hieracium vennicontium	
A hawkweed	Hieracium isabellae	
A hawkweed	Hieracium callistophyllum	
A hawkweed	Hieracium hyparcticoides	
A hawkweed	Hieracium glandulidens	
A hawkweed	Hieracium longilobum	
A hawkweed	Hieracium centripetale	
A hawkweed	Hieracium anfractiforme	
A hawkweed	Hieracium cuspidens	
A hawkweed	Hieracium dissimile	
A hawkweed	Hieracium hastiforme	
A hawkweed	Hieracium diversidens	
A hawkweed	Hieracium westii	
A hawkweed	Hieracium marshallii	
A hawkweed	Hieracium molybdochroum	
A hawkweed	Hieracium senescens	
A hawkweed	Hieracium sinuans	
A hawkweed	Hieracium cremnanthes	
A hawkweed	Hieracium eustales	
A hawkweed	Hieracium insulare	
A hawkweed	Hieracium lingulatum	
A hawkweed	Hieracium hanburyi	
A hawkweed	Hieracium pseudocurvatum	
A hawkweed	Hieracium calenduliflorum	
A hawkweed	Hieracium macrocarpum	
A hawkweed	Hieracium graniticola	
A hawkweed	Hieracium larigense	
A hawkweed	Hieracium globosiflorum	
A hawkweed	Hieracium grovesii	
A hawkweed	Hieracium backhousei	
A hawkweed	Hieracium memorabile	
A hawkweed	Hieracium marginatum	
A hawkweed	Hieracium eximium	
A hawkweed	Hieracium notabile	
A hawkweed	Hieracium subgracilentipes	
A hawkweed	Hieracium tenuifrons	
A hawkweed	Hieracium pseudopetiolatum	
A hawkweed	Hieracium insigne	
Alpine hawkweed	Hieracium alpinum	
A hawkweed	Hieracium holosericeum	
Treasureflower	Gazania rigens	*
Common cudweed	Filago vulgaris	
Red-tipped cudweed	Filago lutescens	
Broad-leaved cudweed	Filago pyramidata	
Small cudweed	Filago minima	
Narrow-leaved cudweed	Filago gallica	*
Mountain everlasting	Antennaria dioica	
Western pearly everlasting	Anaphalis margaritacea	*
Highland cudweed	Omalotheca norvegica	
Heath cudweed	Omalotheca sylvatica	
Dwarf cudweed	Omalotheca supina	
American cudweed	Gamochaeta ustulata	*
Marsh cudweed	Gnaphalium uliginosum	
Jersey cudweed	Pseudognaphalium luteoalbum	
Cape cudweed	Pseudognaphalium undulatum	*
New Zealand everlastingflower	Anaphalioides bellidioides	*
Elecampane	Inula helenium	*
Irish fleabane	Pentanema salicinum	
Ploughman's-spikenard	Pentanema squarrosum	
Golden-samphire	Limbarda crithmoides	
Woody fleabane	Dittrichia viscosa	*
Common fleabane	Pulicaria dysenterica	
Small fleabane	Pulicaria vulgaris	
Yellow oxeye	Telekia speciosa	*
Coastal gumplant	Grindelia stricta	*
Goldenrod	Solidago virgaurea	
Rough-stemmed goldenrod	Solidago rugosa	*
Canadian goldenrod	Solidago canadensis	*
Early goldenrod	Solidago gigantea	*
Grass-leaved goldenrod	Euthamia graminifolia	*
Shrub Goldilocks	Chrysocoma cernua	*
Nettle-leaved Michaelmas-daisy	Eurybia schreberi	*
Goldilocks aster	Galatella linosyris	
Glaucous Michaelmas-daisy	Symphyotrichum laeve	*
Narrow-leaved Michaelmas-daisy	Symphyotrichum lanceolatum	*
Confused Michaelmas-daisy	Symphyotrichum novi-belgii	*
Hairy Michaelmas-daisy	Symphyotrichum novae-angliae	*
Sea aster	Tripolium pannonicum	
Seaside daisy	Erigeron glaucus	*
Alpine fleabane	Erigeron alpiniformis	
Blue fleabane	Erigeron acer	
Tall fleabane	Erigeron annuus	*
Canadian fleabane	Erigeron canadensis	*
Mexican fleabane	Erigeron karvinskianus	*
Robin's-plantain	Erigeron philadelphicus	*
Guernsey fleabane	Erigeron sumatrensis	*
Akiraho	Olearia paniculata	*
New Zealand holly	Olearia macrodonta	*
Akeake	Olearia traversiorum	*
Tree groundsel	Baccharis halimifolia	*
Daisy	Bellis perennis	
Feverfew	Tanacetum parthenium	*
Rayed tansy	Tanacetum macrophyllum	*
Tansy	Tanacetum vulgare	*
Wormwood	Artemisia absinthium	*
Southernwood	Artemisia abrotanum	*
Slender mugwort	Artemisia biennis	*
Field wormwood	Artemisia campestris	
Sea wormwood	Artemisia maritima	
Norwegian mugwort	Artemisia norvegica	
Hoary mugwort	Artemisia stelleriana	*
Chinese mugwort	Artemisia verlotiorum	*
Mugwort	Artemisia vulgaris	
Lavender-cotton	Santolina chamaecyparissus	*
Cottonweed	Otanthus maritimus	
Sneezewort	Achillea ptarmica	
Southern yarrow	Achillea ligustica	*
Yarrow	Achillea millefolium	
Tall yarrow	Achillea distans	*
Chamomile	Chamaemelum nobile	
Sicilian chamomile	Anthemis punctata	*
Corn chamomile	Anthemis arvensis	
Stinking chamomile	Anthemis cotula	
Yellow chamomile	Cota tinctoria	*
Corn marigold	Glebionis segetum	*
Autumn oxeye	Leucanthemella serotina	*
Oxeye daisy	Leucanthemum vulgare	
Scented mayweed	Matricaria chamomilla	
Pineapple mayweed	Matricaria discoidea	*
Sea mayweed	Tripleurospermum maritimum	
Scentless mayweed	Tripleurospermum inodorum	
Buttonweed	Cotula coronopifolia	*
Annual buttonweed	Cotula australis	*
Hairless leptinella	Leptinella dioica	*
Leptinella	Leptinella squalida	*
Marsh ragwort	Jacobaea aquatica	
Hoary ragwort	Jacobaea erucifolia	
Silver ragwort	Jacobaea maritima (formerly Senecio cineraria)	*
Fen ragwort	Jacobaea paludosa	
Common ragwort	Jacobaea vulgaris (formerly Senecio jacobaea)	
Welsh groundsel	Senecio cambrensis	
Golden ragwort	Senecio doria	*
Chamois ragwort	Senecio doronicum	*
Purple ragwort	Senecio grandiflorus	*
Narrow-leaved ragwort	Senecio inaequidens	*
Broad-leaved ragwort	Senecio fluviatilis	*
Wood ragwort	Senecio ovatus	*
Magellan ragwort	Senecio smithii	*
Oxford ragwort	Senecio squalidus	*
Heath groundsel	Senecio sylvaticus	
Eastern groundsel	Senecio vernalis	*
Sticky groundsel	Senecio viscosus	
Common groundsel	Senecio vulgaris	
Cineraria	Pericallis × hybrida	*
Field fleawort	Tephroseris integrifolia	
Marsh fleawort	Tephroseris palustris	e
German-ivy	Delairea odorata	*
Monro's ragwort	Brachyglottis monroi	*
Hedge ragwort	Brachyglottis repanda	*
Chinese ragwort	Sinacalia tangutica	*
Leopardplant	Ligularia dentata	*
Przewalski's leopardplant	Ligularia przewalskii	*
Leopard's-bane	Doronicum pardalianches	*
Plantain-leaved leopard's-bane	Doronicum plantagineum	*
Eastern leopard's-bane	Doronicum columnae	*
Colt's-foot	Tussilago farfara	
Butterbur	Petasites hybridus	
Giant butterbur	Petasites japonicus	*
White butterbur	Petasites albus	*
Winter heliotrope	Petasites pyrenaicus	*
Purple colt's-foot	Homogyne alpina	*
Field marigold	Calendula arvensis	*
Pot marigold	Calendula officinalis	*
Ragweed	Ambrosia artemisiifolia	*
Perennial ragweed	Ambrosia psilostachya	*
Marsh-elder	Cyclachaena xanthiifolia	*
Argentine cocklebur	Xanthium ambrosioides	*
Spiny cocklebur	Xanthium spinosum	*
Rough cocklebur	Xanthium strumarium	*
Western St Paul's-wort	Sigesbeckia serrata	*
Black-eyed Susan	Rudbeckia hirta	*
Coneflower	Rudbeckia laciniata	*
Sunflower	Helianthus annuus	*
Jerusalem artichoke	Helianthus tuberosus	*
Gallant-soldier	Galinsoga parviflora	*
Shaggy-soldier	Galinsoga quadriradiata	*
Nodding bur-marigold	Bidens cernua	
London bur-marigold	Bidens connata	*
Beggarticks	Bidens frondosa	*
Trifid bur-marigold	Bidens tripartita	
Large-flowered tickseed	Coreopsis grandiflora	*
Mexican aster	Cosmos bipinnatus	*
Sneezeweed	Helenium autumnale	*
Hemp-agrimony	Eupatorium cannabinum	
