= Tollymore Forest Park =

Forest park in Northern Ireland

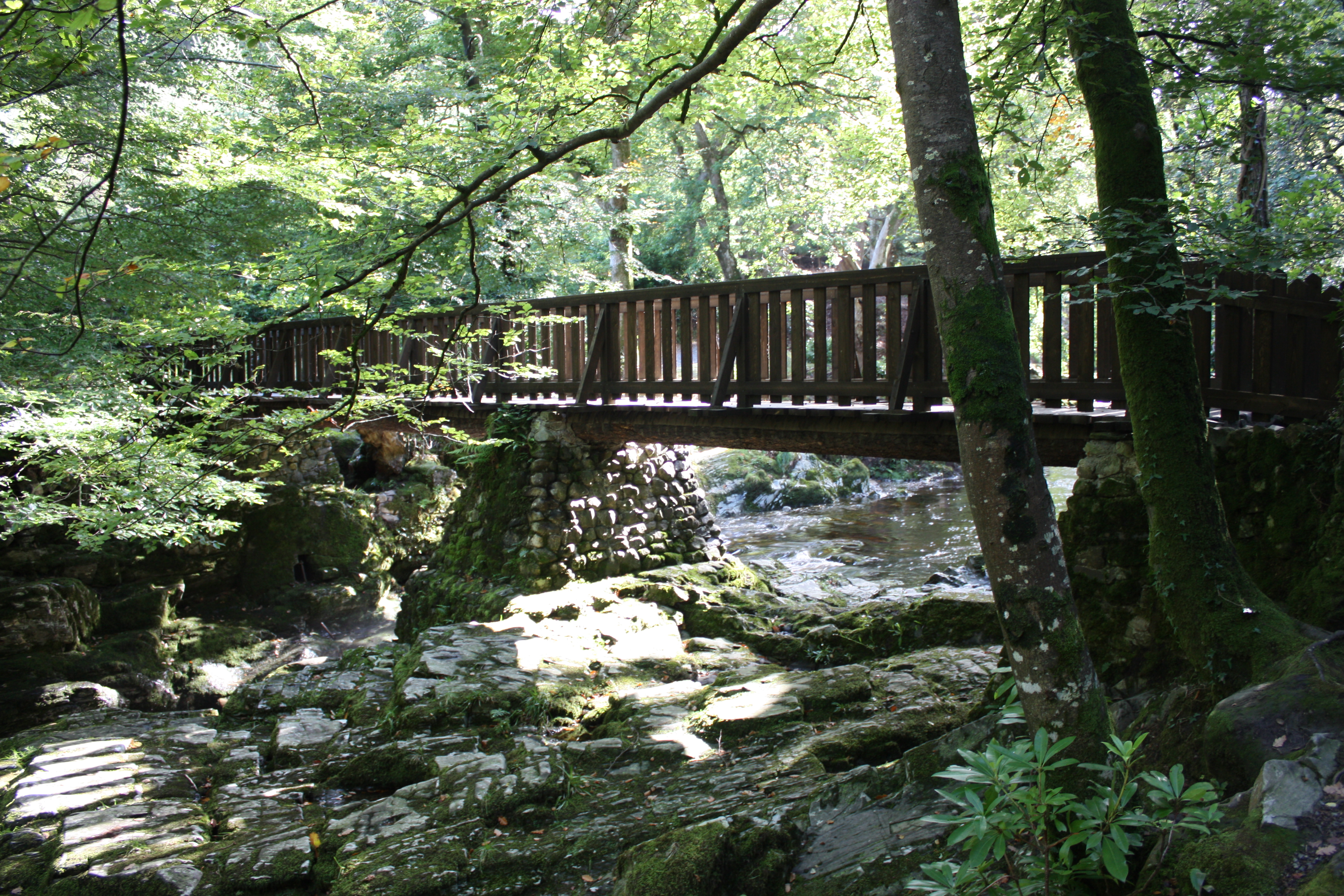
- A wooden footbridge crossing the Shimna River in Tollymore Forest Park

- Location within Northern Ireland

Geography
- Location: Down, Northern Ireland, United Kingdom
- Coordinates: 54.216°N 5.917°W
- Area: 630 hectares (1,600 acres)

Administration
- Established: 2 June 1955
- Authority: Forest Service Northern Ireland

Tollymore Forest Park is a state forest park in Northern Ireland. Located at Bryansford, near the town of Newcastle in the Mourne and Slieve Croob Area of Outstanding Natural Beauty, it became the first state forest park to be established in Northern Ireland on 2 June 1955.

It covers an area of 630 hectares (1,600 acres) at the foot of the Mourne Mountains and has views of the surrounding mountains and the sea at nearby Newcastle. The Shimna River flows through the park where it is crossed by 16 bridges, the earliest dating to 1726. The river is a spawning ground for salmon and trout and is an Area of Special Scientific Interest due to its geology, flora and fauna.

The forest has four walking trails signposted by different coloured arrows, the longest being the "long haul trail" at 8 miles (13 km) long. It was listed in The Sunday Times top twenty British picnic sites for 2000. The Forest Park has been managed by the Forest Service since they purchased it from the Roden Estate in 1941.

== History ==
=== Early history ===
The name Tollymore (Tulaigh Mhór) is derived from "large hill or mound", referring to the two hills, approximately 250 m high, which are located within the forest boundary. Their official names have been recorded as Slieve Neir (possibly from Sliabh an Aoire, meaning "the mountain of the shepherd") and Slieve Snaran (from either snarvan, meaning to creep, or snarban, meaning a cataract). However, they are more commonly known as The Drinns and Curraghard, meaning "ridge" and "marshy upland" respectively.

After the Norman invasion of Ulster in 1177 and the creation of the Earldom of Ulster, the Magennis clan gained power in the area. The extended Magennis families controlled most of the land in the south of County Down by the 15th century, including the area where Tollymore is located. On 22 February 1611, Tollymore (officially referred to as Ballytollymore) was included in seven and a half townlands which were surrendered to the English crown in return for a formal freehold in the name of Brian McHugh McAghorley Magennis. The land was passed to his grandson in 1628 and when he died without issue in the 1660s, it was passed to Brian Magennis' only daughter Ellen, who was married to William Hamilton of Ayrshire.

=== Hamilton family ===
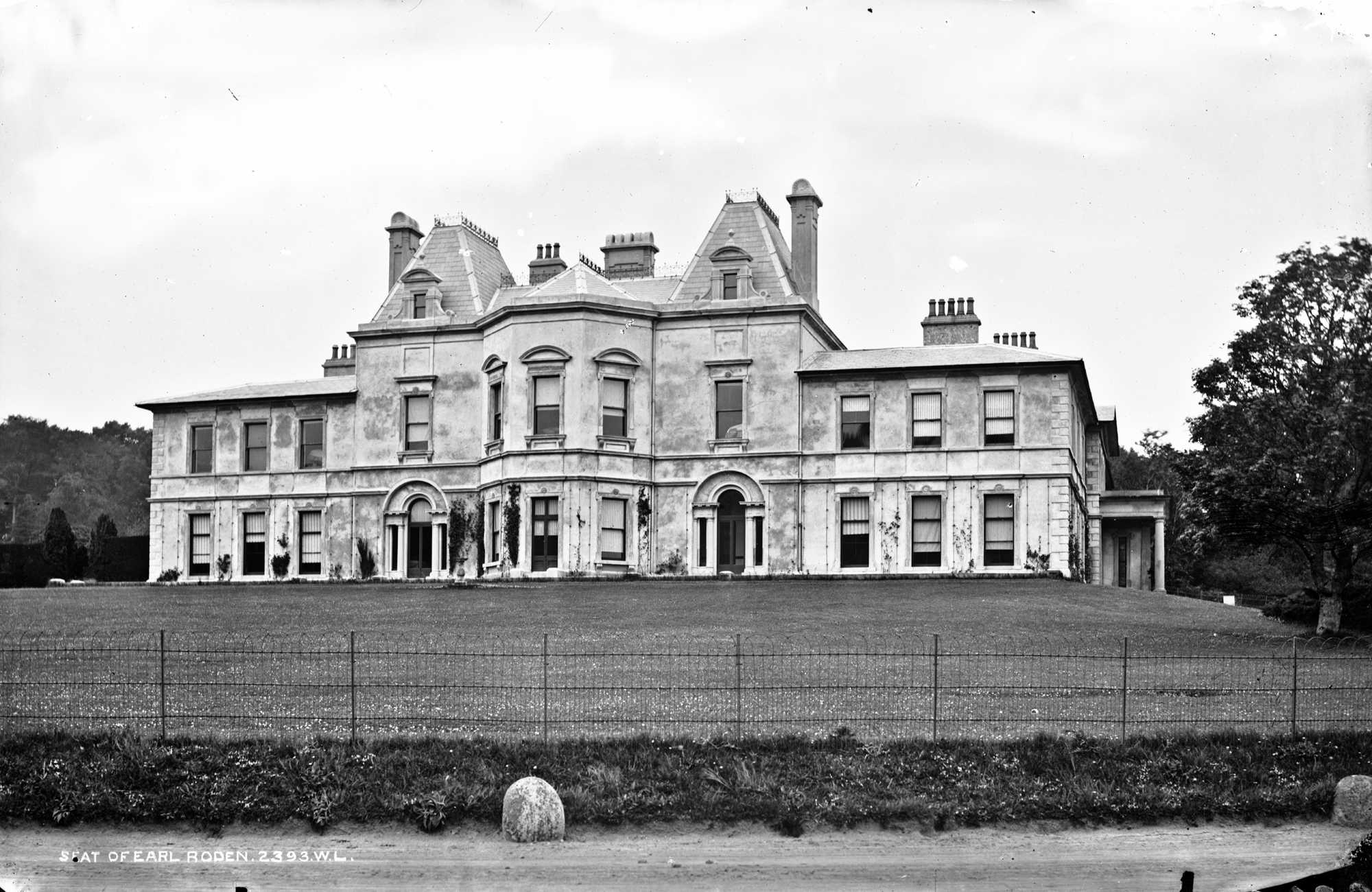
Bryansford House, also known as Tollymore Park House (demolished 1952)

William Hamilton was from Lecale, County Down, and was a close relative of James Hamilton, 1st Viscount Claneboye, who acquired a large amount of land in County Down a number of years before the Plantation of Ulster. The land was passed to his son James upon his death in 1674.

Tollymore was one of the properties forfeit from the reversal of Cromwellian land settlement and the Act of Settlement 1662 by James II's Patriot Parliament in 1689. This was likely because James Hamilton had raised a regiment in support of William of Orange and was providing the Williamites with supplies. County Down was not involved in the subsequent war.

James Hamilton died in 1701 and Tollymore was passed to his son, also James Hamilton, who became Viscount Limerick in 1719 and 1st Earl of Clanbrassil (second creation) in 1756.

The Hamilton family owned Tollymore until James Hamilton, William's great grandson, died in 1798. The estate was transferred to his sister Anne and her husband, Robert Jocelyn, 1st Earl of Roden. The Jocelyn family continued ownership of Tollymore until Robert Jocelyn, 8th Earl of Roden sold it to the Ministry of Agriculture for use in the forestry industry. It was sold in two parts, the first in 1930 and the remaining in 1941.

The seat of the Roden family in Tollymore demesne, known as 'Tollymore Park House' or 'Bryansford House', was a Georgian mansion built initially for James Hamilton, 1st Earl of Clanbrassil (second creation) around 1730, and was demolished in 1952.

During the 1800s, the forest contained five saw mills for processing felled trees. The mills were located on the banks of the Shimna River and powered by water. Millponds stored water, which during dry periods was released to turn the water wheels. The millponds are still located in the forest but are no longer in use.

Between 1994 and 2003, four flint artefacts were discovered in the park, close to the Shimna River. A flake, two blades and a concave scraper were found in two locations the forest. The flake, scraper and one of the blades were identified as prehistoric. The second blade was identified as Late Mesolithic or Early Neolithic. A fifth artefact, a Bronze Age barbed and tanged arrowhead, was found in a nearby field.

== Structures, follies and bridges ==
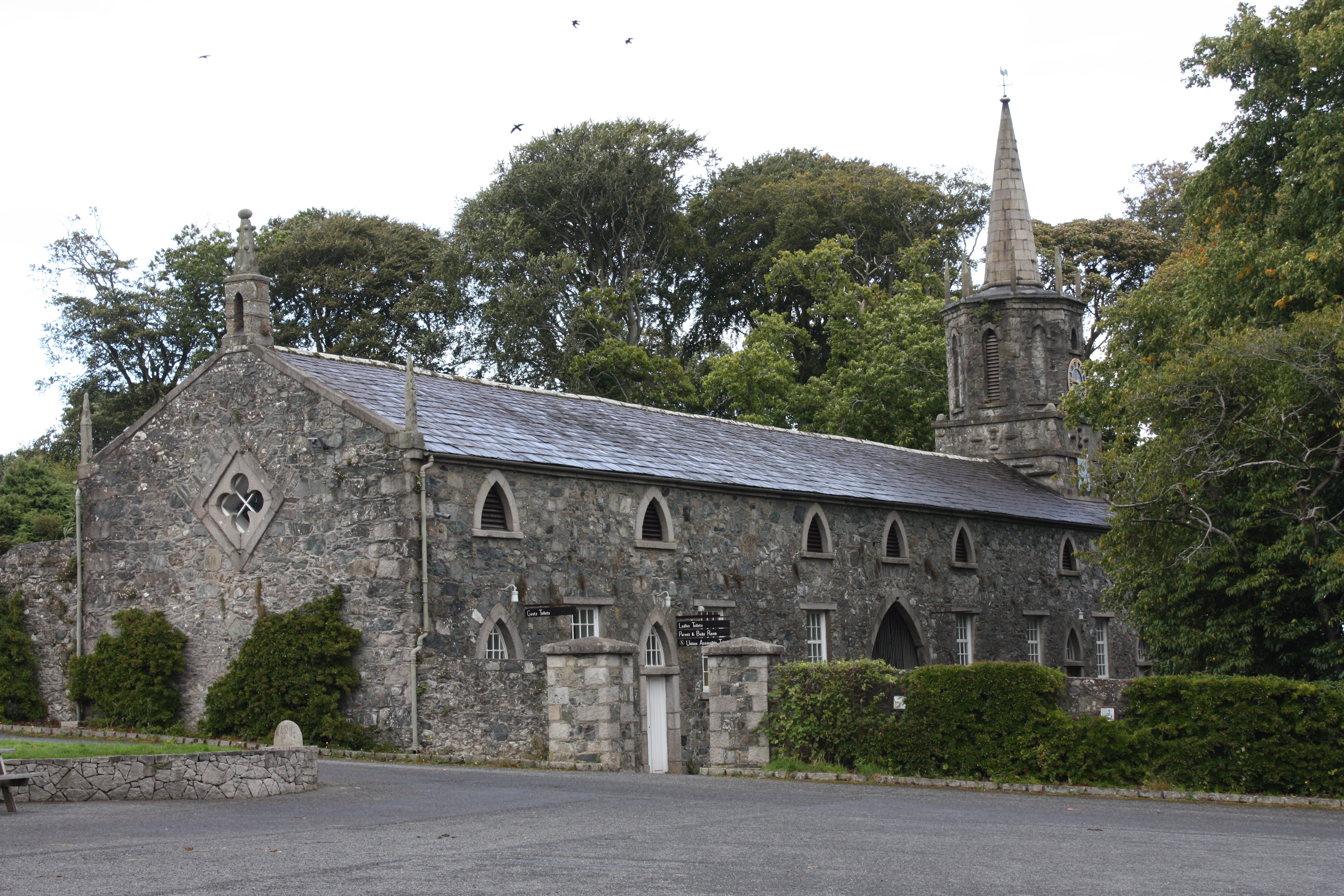
Clanbrassil Barn

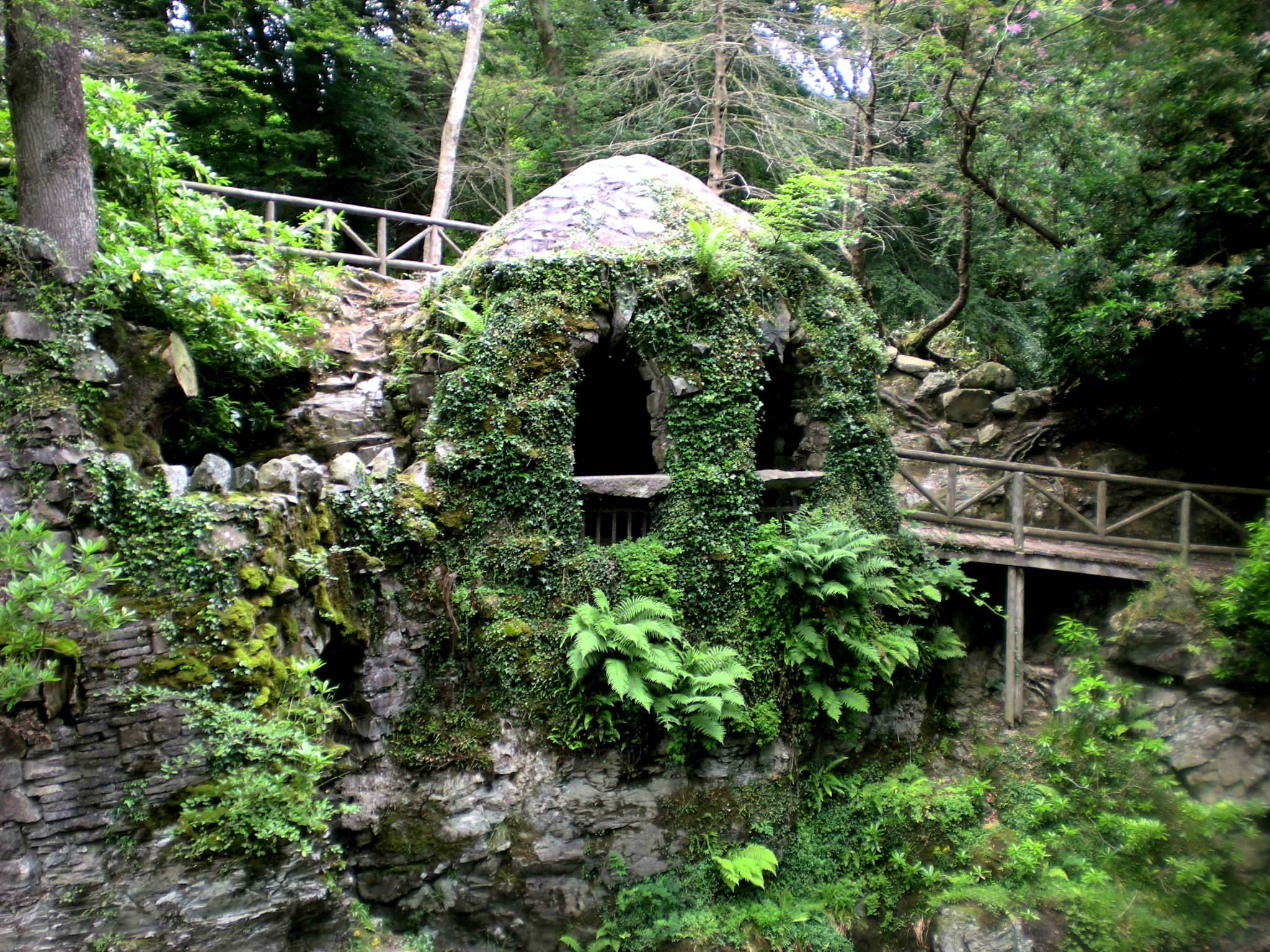
The Hermitage, Tollymore Forest Park

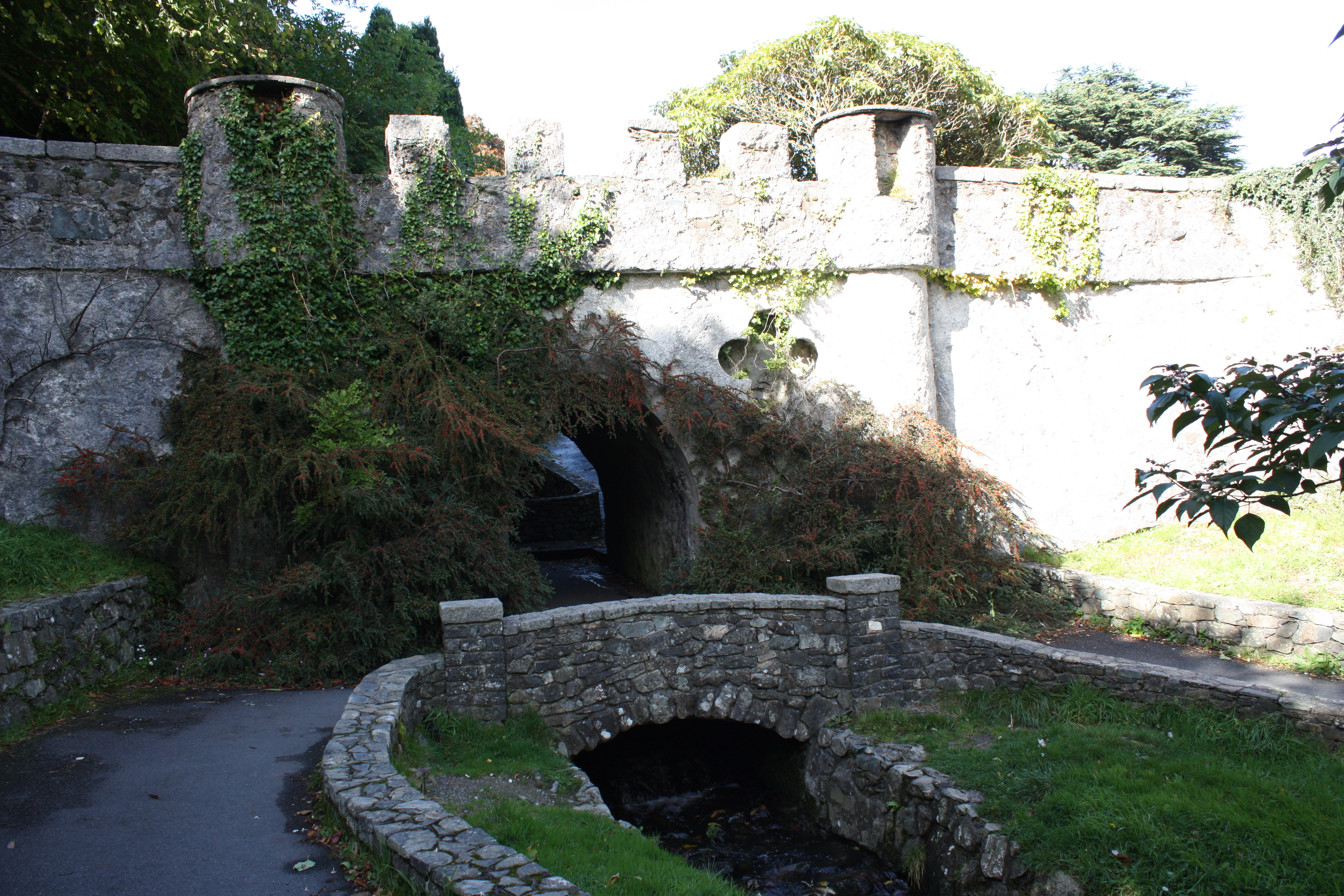
Horn Bridge

Tollymore features many follies whose design were influenced by Thomas Wright of Durham, a friend of James Hamilton, 1st Earl of Clanbrassil. At the entrance and exit to the park there are Gothic gate arches built by James Hamilton, 2nd Earl of Clanbrassil (Viscount Limerick). The gate and gate lodge at the exit were built in 1786 and, along with the front walling, are grade B1 listed structures. The barbican gate, also of Gothic design, is located on the main drive at the entrance to the park. It was built in 1780 and is a B+ listed building.

Clanbrassil Barn, located near the exit to the park, was built in around 1757 by James Hamilton (1st Earl of Clanbrassil). The building was designed to look like a church. A steeple containing a bell, clock and sundial was added to the east end of the building in 1789. The barn, attached Gothic gate and wall are grade B1 listed buildings. The barn functioned as a stable and store until 1971. The ground floor now contains toilets and an education room.

A granite obelisk, located on a small grassy hill near the main drive, was built between 1812 and 1820 by Robert Jocelyn, 2nd Earl of Roden as a monument to his son, James Bligh Jocelyn, who died of an asthma attack while serving in the Royal Navy.

There are numerous artificial and natural features along the Shimna River, including bridges, grottos and caves. The Hermitage is a small stone shelter designed by James Hamilton (2nd Earl of Clanbrassil) in the 1770s in memory to his friend the John Montagu, Marquess of Monthermer. It is built into the side of the gorge above the river and was used as a place for ladies to shelter while the men fished. There is an inscription in Greek within the Hermitage which translates as "Clanbrassil, to his very dear friend Monthermer 1770".

The Shimna River is crossed by 16 bridges as it flows through Tollymore. The Old Bridge, built by James Hamilton in 1726, is the oldest of the current bridges. The Ivy Bridge was built in 1780 and Foley's Bridge in 1787. Parnell Bridge, named in recognition of Sir John Parnell who visited Tollymore in the late 18th century, was constructed in 1842. It was the last stone bridge to be built in Tollymore. The more recent footbridges are constructed from wood. Horn Bridge crosses a small culverted burn (stream) and is crossed by a gravel road. The burn below the bridge is covered with a board walk connected to a path. It was built c.1770 by either the 1st or 2nd Earl.

The King's Grave is a megalithic cairn located in the western end of the park. It is 22 yards (20 m) across and 10 feet (3.0 m) high and dates to 1000 - 1500 BC.

The white fort is located in the west of the park, about halfway between Parnell's Bridge and Horne Bridge. It is a large cashel measuring 44x54 m with 3 m thick walls. The walls are approximately 2 m high but were likely more than double that when it was in use during the first millennium AD.

In 2014, the Mourne Heritage Trust carried out restoration work on 15 structures within the park including the granite monument, both gates, the hermitage, Foley's Bridge, Horn Bridge and the Old Bridge.

== Ecology ==
Tollymore contains a population of approximately 120-150 wild fallow deer, which have been in the park since the 1970s. The forest service carry out a cull of the deer once a year, to keep the population from becoming too large.

Red squirrels were first recorded in the park in 1880, although they are likely to have been present before then. A decline in numbers was noticed in 2004. A rise in grey squirrel numbers, first seen in the park approximately 10 years previously, was noted at the same time. Since then The Tollymore Red Squirrel Group, consisting of volunteers, forest service staff and members of the Mourne Heritage Trust, have been working to preserve the species within the forest by providing additional food and attempting to reduce the numbers of grey squirrels. In 2011 approximately 90% of the park's red squirrel population were killed by squirrel pox, passed on by the grey squirrels. The following year there were only an estimated 10 to 15 red squirrels remaining. However, numbers did recover over the following 5 years. Although an approximately 50% increase in red squirrel sightings was reported during the later part of 2013, exact numbers were not known as the Tollymore Red Squirrel Group were unable to carry out their annual survey in October 2013. There was a second outbreak of squirrel pox in 2016 although it didn't have the same fatality rate as the 2011 outbreak.

In 2007 a breeding pair of great spotted woodpeckers, which had not bred in Ireland for centuries, were recorded in Tollymore for the first time. Another breeding pair, along with juveniles, were spotted in the park in 2009 and 2010. Evidence of nesting in previous years has also been observed. Kingfishers and dippers can also be seen in the park, close to the river. A population of approximately 20-30 pairs of feral Mandarin ducks have been present on the Shimna river and on a pond within the park since 1978. Tollymore and the Shimna river are the only place in Ireland where Mandarins have been regularly recorded.

Pine martens, which are one of the rarest native mammal species in Ireland, are frequently spotted in the park by volunteers monitoring the squirrels. Badgers, foxes and otters are also present in the forest.

== Botany ==
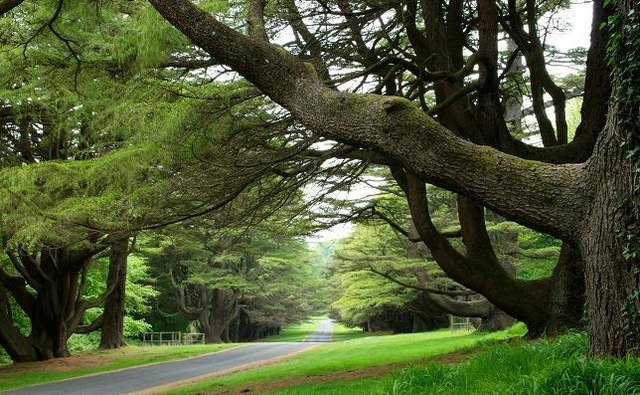
Himalayan cedars along the main drive

The arboretum in Tollymore was started in 1752 and is one of the oldest in Ireland. It contains trees from many different parts of the world, including the remains of a giant redwood which was struck by lightning. The slightly milder climate in the area, due to its proximity to the coast, provided more favourable growing conditions than further inland for the more exotic trees in the arboretum.

The most common trees in the park are ash (Fraxinus excelsior), beech (Fagus sylvatica), birch and Oak (including Quercus robur and Quercus ilex). Larch, Sitka spruce and willow are also found in reasonable quantities. Other trees present include field maple (Acer campestre), Himalayan cedars (Cedrus deodara), coast Douglas fir (Pseudotsuga menziesii var. menziesii) and yew (Taxus baccata).

The slow growing spruce Picea abies 'Clanbrassiliana' originated near the park in 1750. The original tree of this species is the oldest tree found in any arboretum in Ireland. Wood from the oak trees in Tollymore was used by Harland and Wolff for the interior of the RMS Titanic.

In 2011 there was an outbreak of the tree disease Phytophthora lateralis, affecting approximately 800 Lawson cypress trees over a two hector area. Felling of infected trees was carried out to prevent further spread.

Shrub species found in the park include Rhododendron, elderberry, blackberry, laurel and ivy. Lawn areas contain bent (various Agrostis species) buttercups, clover, dandelions, meadow grass and perennial reygrass (Lolium perenne). In 2012, 50 hectares of the invasive Rhododendron ponticum was removed from forests in the Mourne area, including Tollymore. The project was carried out to improve the quality of the woodland and prevent the spread of Phytophthora ramorum, which the species is known to host.

Algae (Nitella flexilis) and ferns (Hymenophyllum wilsonii, Phegopteris connectilis, Polystichum aculeatum and Dryopteris aemula) are also common. Other plant species include:

- Acaena ovalifolia, an invasive Acaena species which is now illegal to plant in the wild in Northern Ireland.
- Acaena novae-zelandiae, an invasive plant native to Australia and New Zealand.
- Prunus padus, also known as Bird Cherry.
- Rosa arvensis, also known as the Field Rose or Trailing Rose.
- Circaea × intermedia, a hybrid of Circaea alpina and Circaea lutetiana
- Pyrola minor, a flowering plant also known as snowline, lesser or common wintergreen.
- Scrophularia auriculata, a perennial plant found near the edges of rivers or ponds.
- Mimulus moschatus, a flowering plant native to western North America
- Melampyrum pratense, a herbaceous plant also known as common cow-wheat.
- Lathraea squamaria, also known as common toothwort.
- Pinguicula lusitanica, also known as pale butterwort
- Mentha gentilis, a hybrid mint plant.
- Sambucus ebulus, a herbaceous species of elder.
- Erigeron karvinskianus, wildflower native to South America and Mexico.
- A number of species of hawkweed (Hieracium senescens, Hieracium argenteum, Hieracium duriceps, Hieracium grandidens, Hieracium stewartii)
- Neottia nidus-avis, also known as Bird's-nest orchid
- A number of species of sedge (Carex laevigata, Carex pallescens, Carex pilulifera)
- Festuca altissima, a species of grass belonging to the genus Festuca.
- Melica uniflora, a species of grass also known as wood melick.
- Milium effusum, a species of grass also known as American milletgrass or Wood millet.

== Uses ==
=== Recreation ===
The park has designated areas for camping and caravans.

There are four official walking trails within the forest each marked with different coloured sign posts. All the trails start and end in the main car park. The blue tail (Arboretum Path) is half a mile long and passes through the arboretum. The red tail (River Trail) is three miles long and follows the Shimna River up one side as far as Parnell's bridge and then back along the other side. The black trail (Mountain Trail) is five and half miles long and the black trail 1 (The Drinns Trail) adds another three miles to the black trail by passing behind The Drinns (two forested hills) and following the boundary wall. The Ulster Way also passes through the forest.

=== Filming ===
The forest has been used as a filming location for the TV series Game of Thrones and the film Dracula Untold.

== See also ==
- List of tourist attractions in Ireland
