= H. maculatum =

H. maculatum may refer to:

- Hieracium maculatum, the spotted hawkweed, a flowering plant species found in Europe
- Hypericum maculatum, the imperforate St John's-wort, a plant species native to Europe and Western Asia
