= Taraxacum azzizii =

Scientific classification
- Kingdom: Plantae
- Clade: Tracheophytes
- Clade: Angiosperms
- Clade: Eudicots
- Clade: Asterids
- Order: Asterales
- Family: Asteraceae
- Genus: Taraxacum
- Species: T. azzizii

Binomial name
- Taraxacum azzizii Soest

Species of flowering plant

Taraxacum azzizii is a species of perennial herbaceous plant in the family Asteraceae, belonging to the genus Taraxacum, which includes a wide range of dandelion species. It is native to a region extending from Afghanistan to the western Himalaya, where it occurs primarily in temperate biomes, often in open or semi-natural habitats. The species was first formally described in 1963 by the Dutch botanist Johannes Leendert van Soest, with the description published in the botanical journal Wentia.
