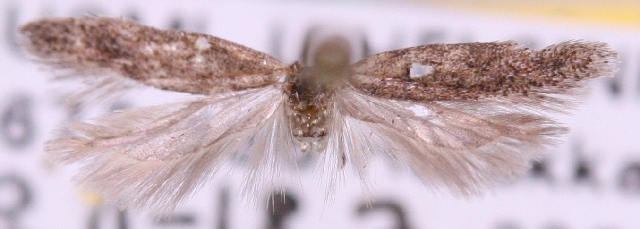

Scientific classification
- Domain: Eukaryota
- Kingdom: Animalia
- Phylum: Arthropoda
- Class: Insecta
- Order: Lepidoptera
- Family: Gelechiidae
- Genus: Scrobipalpa
- Species: S. proclivella

Binomial name
- Scrobipalpa proclivella (Fuchs, 1886)

Synonyms
- Lita proclivella Fuchs, 1886; Gnorimoschema proclivellum

= Scrobipalpa proclivella =

Species of moth

Scrobipalpa proclivella is a moth of the family Gelechiidae. It is found in large parts of Europe, east to the southern Ural Mountains and Siberia.

The wingspan is 9–10 mm (0.35–0.39 in). Adults have been recorded on wing in May and from July to August in two generations per year.

The larvae feed on Achillea clavenae, Artemisia absinthium, Artemisia vulgaris, Leucanthemella serotina and Tanacetum vulgare. The larvae can be found from May to June and from September to October.
