= Hieracium stoloniferum =

Hieracium stoloniferum may refer to:

- Hieracium stoloniferum Viv., a synonym of Sonchus bulbosus subsp. bulbosus
- Hieracium stoloniferum Besser, a synonym of Pilosella auriculoides (Láng) Arv.-Touv.
