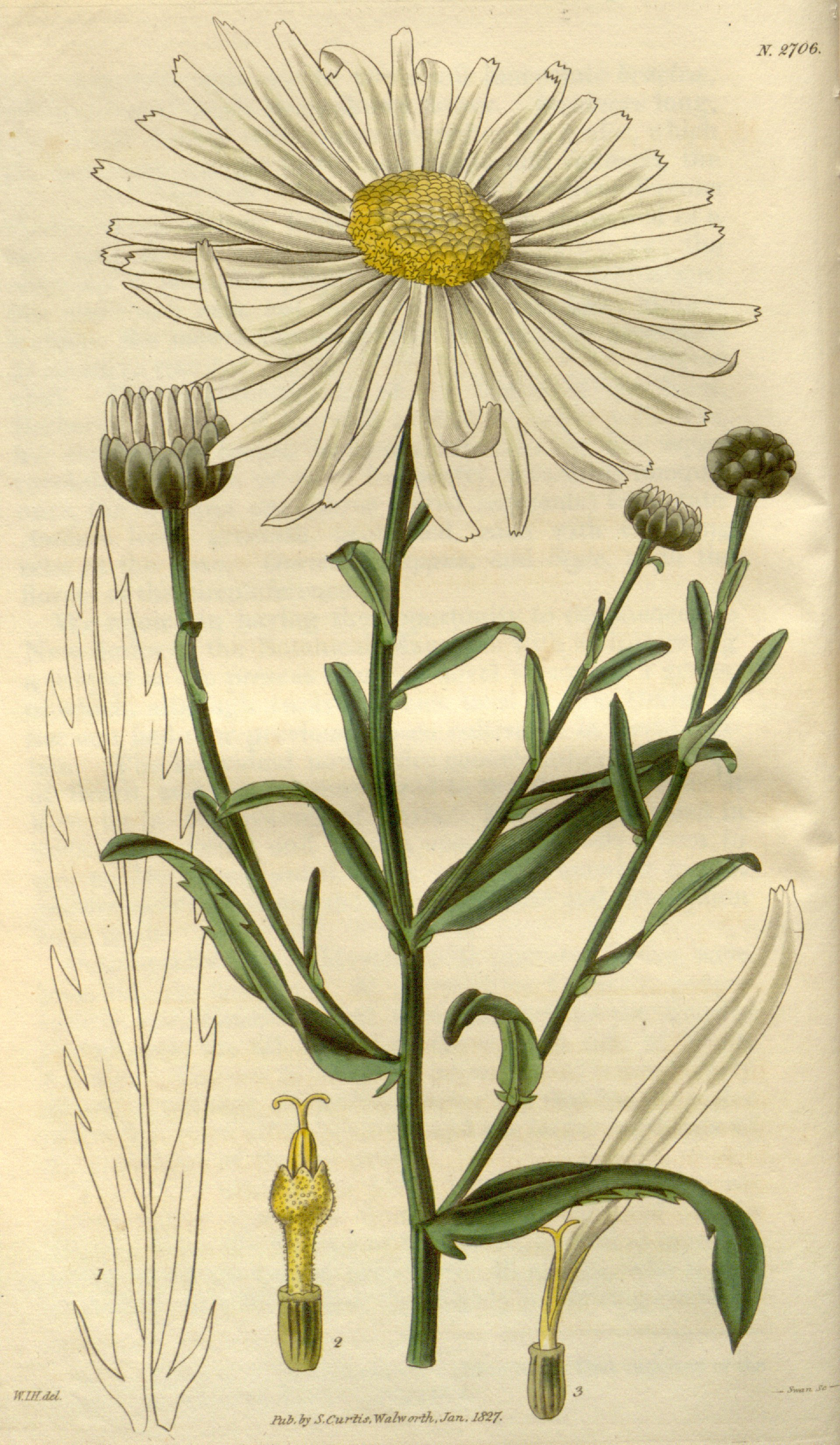
- Leucanthemella serotina

Scientific classification
- Kingdom: Plantae
- Clade: Tracheophytes
- Clade: Angiosperms
- Clade: Eudicots
- Clade: Asterids
- Order: Asterales
- Family: Asteraceae
- Subfamily: Asteroideae
- Tribe: Anthemideae
- Genus: Leucanthemella; Tzvelev

Type species
- Leucanthemella serotina (L.) Tzvelev

Synonyms
- Decaneurum Sch.Bip. ex Walp. 1843, illegitimate homonym not DC. 1833

= Leucanthemella =

Genus of flowering plants

Leucanthemella is a genus of flowering plants in the sunflower/daisy family Asteraceae.

It contains two species of herbaceous perennials found in marshy habitats. They have hairy foliage and composite daisy-like white flowers in late summer and autumn. They are hardy in the most extreme European climates, down to −20 °C (−4 °F) or less, but in cultivation favour a sheltered position.

Leucanthemella serotina, autumn ox-eye or giant daisy, is native to Eastern Europe (between Poland, Montenegro, and Ukraine) and widely introduced in (north)western to south-central Europe. It is a vigorous, erect perennial growing to 1.5 m (5 ft) tall, bearing flowerheads with white ray florets and greenish-yellow centres, throughout autumn. It is cultivated in gardens, and has gained the Royal Horticultural Society's Award of Garden Merit.

Leucanthemella linearis (Matsumura) Tzvelev is native to East Asia. It is found in Russia (Primorye), China (Heilongjiang, Jilin, and Liaoning Provinces), Korea, and Japan (Honshu and Kyushu).
