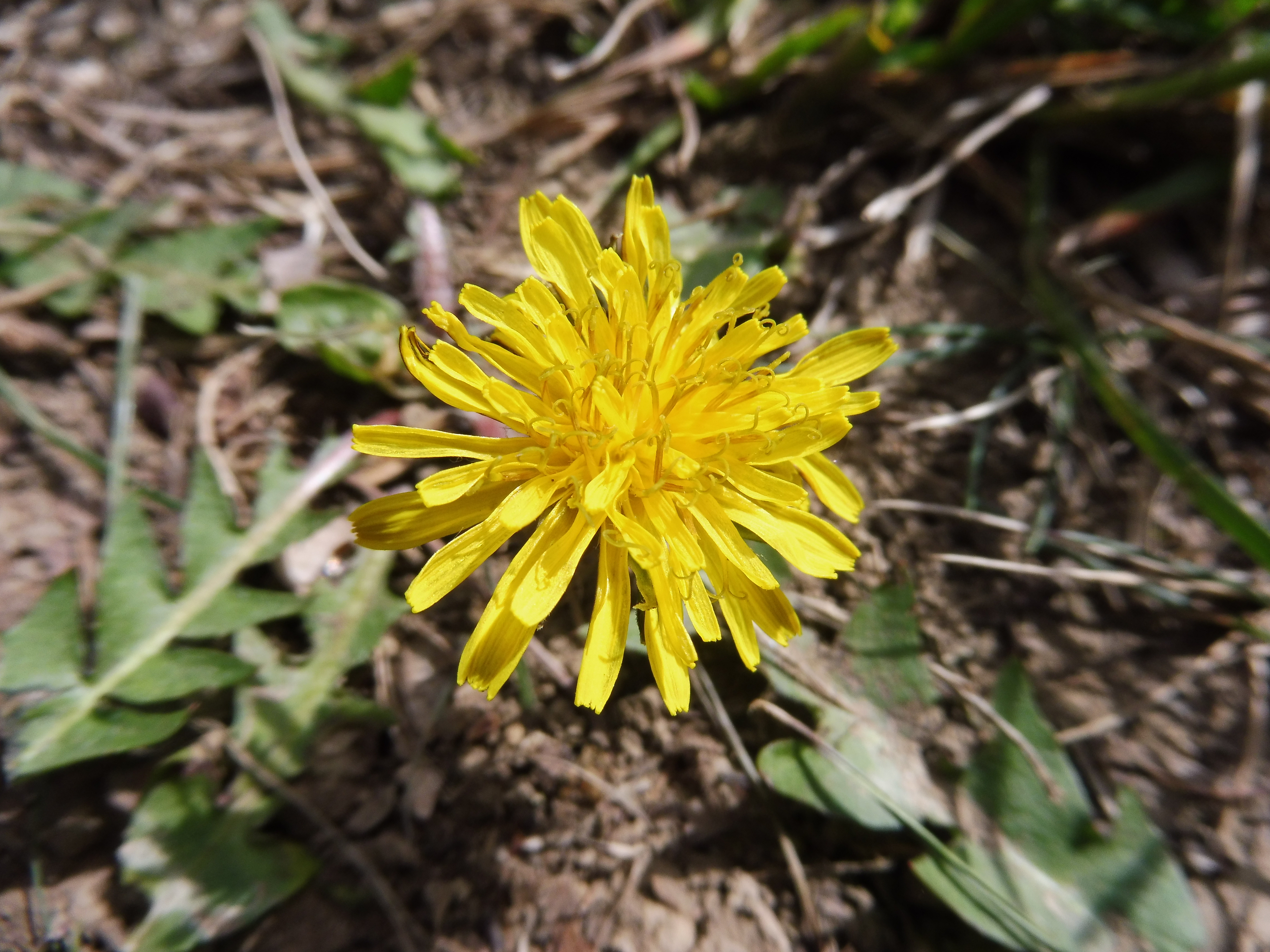

Scientific classification
- Kingdom: Plantae
- Clade: Tracheophytes
- Clade: Angiosperms
- Clade: Eudicots
- Clade: Asterids
- Order: Asterales
- Family: Asteraceae
- Genus: Taraxacum
- Species: T. brachyglossum

Binomial name
- Taraxacum brachyglossum (Dahlst.) Raunk.
- Taraxacum brachyglossum range

= Taraxacum brachyglossum =

Species of flowering plant

Taraxacum brachyglossum, commonly known as the purple-bracted dandelion, is a species of flowering plant in the family Asteraceae. It belongs to Taraxacum section Erythrosperma, a group of dandelions typically associated with dry, open habitats and known for their reddish achenes and distinctive bract coloration. Native to much of central and western Europe, including Great Britain, and introduced in parts of North America and southern Africa, T. brachyglossum is one of the more frequently encountered members of its section in the British Isles.

The species is characterized by its dull green, narrowly lobed leaves, purplish unwinged petioles, and glaucous-purple, horn-tipped outer bracts. Its yellow flower heads often display purple-striped ligules, and the reddish achenes are topped with a short cone. T. brachyglossum exhibits notable variation in reproductive strategy, ranging from sexual reproduction to facultative or obligate agamospermy, and shows a wide range of chromosome numbers. Although it frequently forms pure populations, it can hybridize with other Taraxacum species.

== Description ==
Taraxacum brachyglossum is a member of the section Erythrosperma and displays a characteristic morphology. The leaves measure between 30 and 200 mm in length, are dull green in color, and bear 4 to 6 lobes that are patent or slightly recurved, often narrow and sometimes linear. The petiole is typically dull purple and unwinged. Scapes range from 30 to 150 mm in height and may be prostrate or erect; they are usually suffused with purple and bear arachnoid (cobwebby) hairs beneath the capitulum. The exterior bracts measure approximately 7 × 2 mm, are spreading and glaucous, often with purplish suffusion on the upper surface, and possess horn-like tips (corniculate) with a pale margin.

The capitulum is 20 to 30 mm in diameter and yellow in color, with ligules striped purple. Styles are exserted and discoloured, and pollen is typically present. Achenes are chestnut-red, about 2.8 mm long, and topped with a cone approximately 0.9 mm in length. The species exhibits considerable variation in chromosome number, with reported counts including 2n = 16, 17, 18, 20, 22, 24, and 26. It may reproduce sexually, as a facultative agamosperm, or asexually as an obligate agamosperm.

This species is distinguished by its spreading glaucous-purple outer bracts, discoloured and polliniferous styles, and reddish achenes. Although it is one of the most frequently encountered Erythrosperma species in Britain, sexual individuals appear to be relatively uncommon, and populations are often pure. Hybrids have been reported with T. oxoniense, T. subcyanolepis, and T. hamatum, and their presence should be considered when identifying individuals in the field.

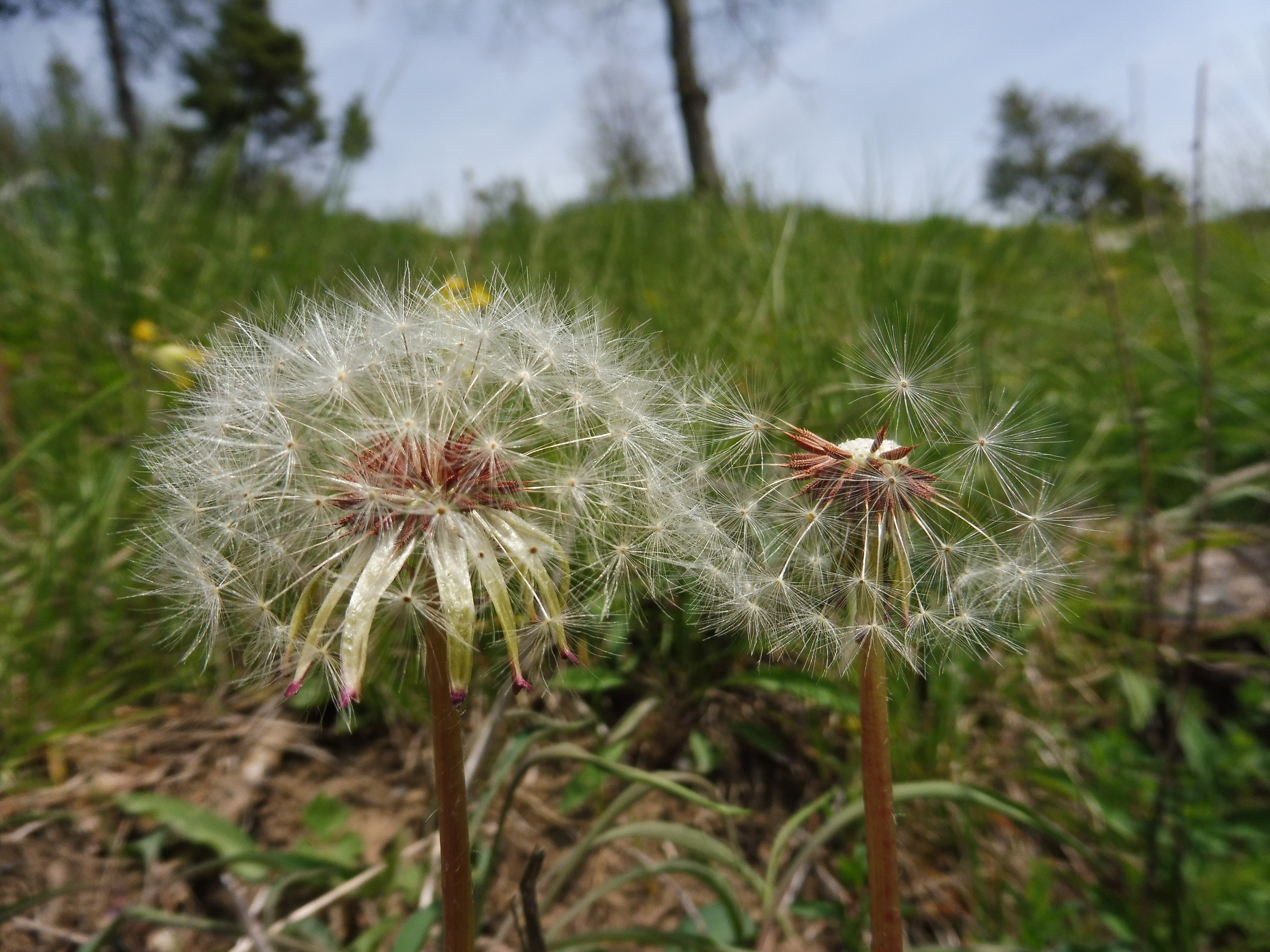
Seedheads

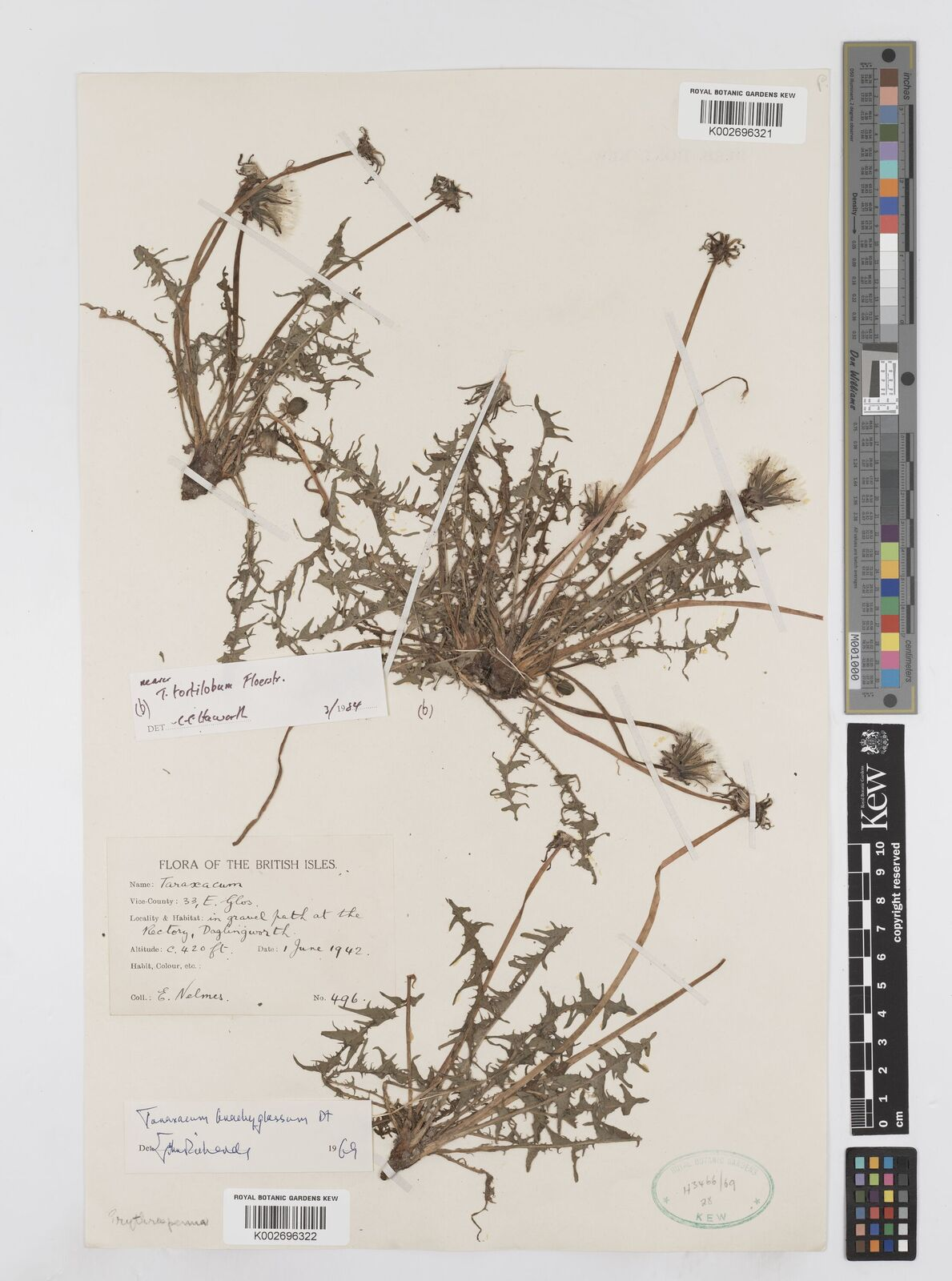
Specimens from 1942

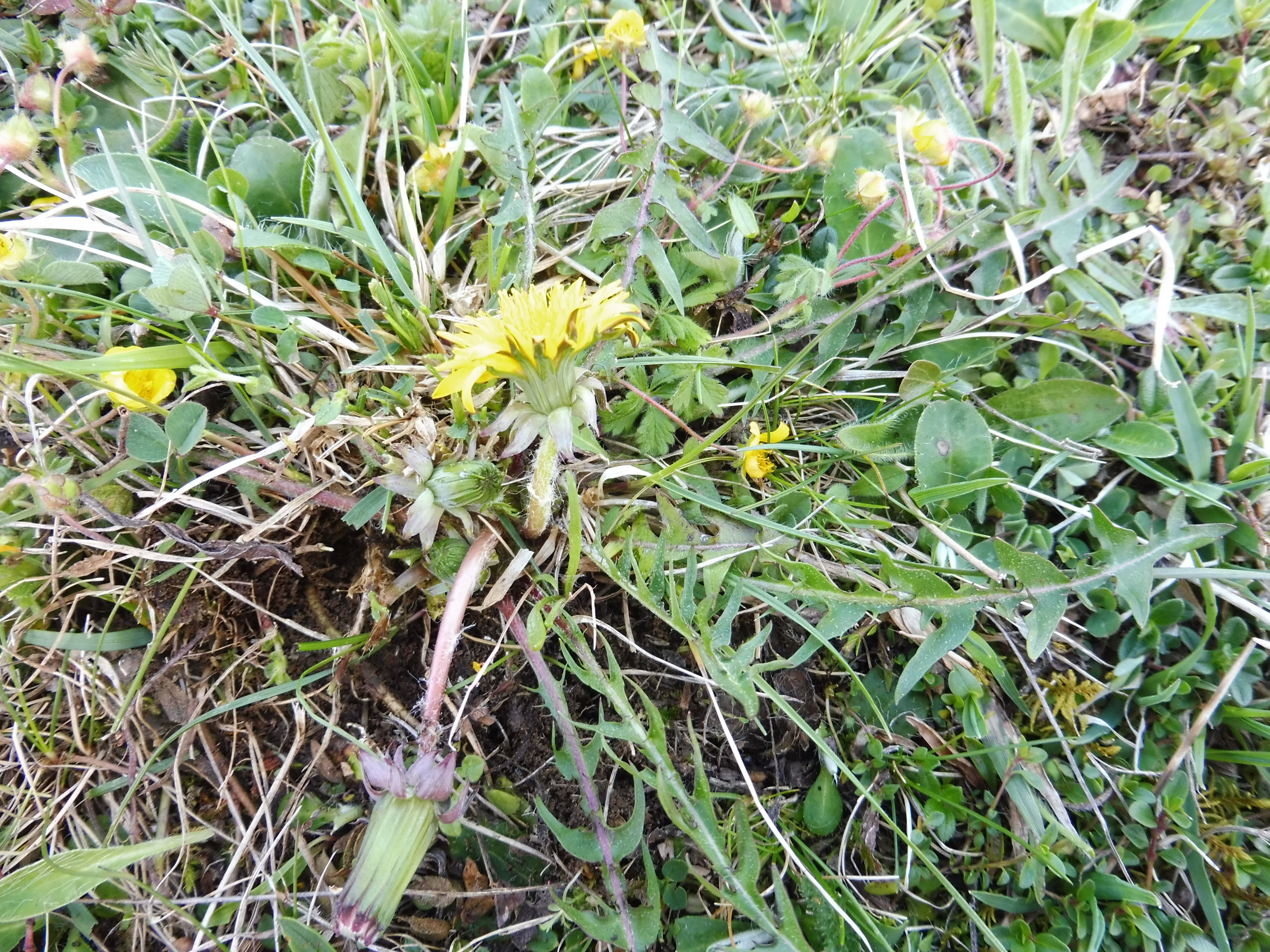
Growth habit

== Taxonomy ==
Taraxacum brachyglossum was first validly published in 1906 in the second edition of Dansk Ekskursionsflora on page 257, based on an earlier description by Gustav Adolf Hugo Dahlstedt and formally named by Christen Raunkiaer. The species belongs to Taraxacum section Erythrosperma, a group of dandelions typically found in dry, open habitats and noted for their reddish achenes. Taraxacum brachyglossum displays multiple reproductive strategies, including sexual reproduction, facultative agamospermy, and obligate agamospermy. Reported chromosome counts range from 2n = 16 to 2n = 26. Although hybridization has been reported with Taraxacum oxoniense, Taraxacum subcyanolepis, and Taraxacum hamatum, the species frequently occurs in pure, morphologically consistent populations.

A homotypic synonym of this species is Taraxacum erythrospermum subsp. brachyglossum, published by Dahlstedt in Botaniska Notiser in 1905. Heterotypic synonyms include Taraxacum brachyglossum f. fulvifructum, described by Soest in Dumortiera in 1976, and Taraxacum vachellii, described by Dahlstedt in 1933 in the Report of the Botanical Society and Exchange Club of the British Isles.

== Distribution and habitat ==
Taraxacum brachyphyllum is native to central and western Europe, with its range extending west to France and Great Britain, and northward into southern Scandinavia. It is found throughout much of continental Europe, including Austria, Belgium, the Baltic States, Denmark, Finland, France, Germany, Italy, the Netherlands, Norway, Poland, Romania, Sweden, Switzerland, Ukraine, and the northwestern Balkan Peninsula. Beyond its native range, T. brachyphyllum has been introduced to parts of North America and southern Africa, including British Columbia in Canada, and the Cape Provinces, Free State, and Lesotho in South Africa.

The species typically inhabits dry, open, and often disturbed environments. It grows in calcareous grasslands, sandy heaths, sand dunes, and on old walls, favoring well-drained, nutrient-poor soils. Its adaptability to a range of dry habitats contributes to its widespread occurrence. Although it is one of the more common members of the British Taraxacum section Erythrosperma, T. brachyphyllum often occurs in pure populations and is recognized for its partially or fully sexual reproduction strategies. It thrives particularly well in habitats where minimal competition and dry conditions prevail.
