= Taraxacum dunense =

Scientific classification
- Kingdom: Plantae
- Clade: Tracheophytes
- Clade: Angiosperms
- Clade: Eudicots
- Clade: Asterids
- Order: Asterales
- Family: Asteraceae
- Genus: Taraxacum
- Species: T. dunense

Binomial name
- Taraxacum dunense Soest

Species of flowering plant

Taraxacum dunense, commonly known as the dune dandelion, is a perennial herbaceous plant species in the family Asteraceae, native to northwestern Europe. It is primarily found in coastal sand-dune habitats, where it is adapted to grow in temperate biomes with sandy, nutrient-poor soils. The species was first formally described in 1956 by Dutch botanist Johannes Leendert van Soest in Acta Botanica Neerlandica. Like many members of its genus, it employs anemochory for seed dispersal, relying on wind to distribute its distinctive violet achenes.

== Description ==
Taraxacum dunense is a perennial herbaceous species notable for its distinctive leaf morphology and dark-hued reproductive features. The basal leaves range from 50 to 120 mm in length and are dark green, frequently tinged with a purplish coloration. They are deeply divided, typically featuring 5 to 10 linear, patent lobes. The interlobes are straight, exceptionally narrow, and often bear additional lobules or irregular marginal teeth. The petioles are unwinged, extremely slender, and prominently dark violet-purple, contributing to the plant’s characteristic appearance.

The scapes, which support the inflorescences, measure between 50 and 150 mm in height and may be decumbent or erect in posture. They are purplish in color and covered with fine arachnoid (cobweb-like) hairs. The outer involucral bracts are approximately 7 mm long and 2 mm wide, green, and spread outward. They are corniculate, bearing small horn-like projections, and exhibit minimal or no marginal bordering. The capitulum (flower head) is about 30 mm in diameter and composed of deep yellow ligulate florets, with the outermost ligules striped with purple on the reverse. The styles are exserted and discolored, and viable pollen is present. The achenes are dark violet, measuring approximately 3.5 mm in length, with a conical apex (cone) around 1.2 mm long. The species has a diploid chromosome number of 2n = 24. It disperses its seeds by wind, a mechanism known as anemochory.

== Distribution and habitat ==
Taraxacum dunense is native to parts of northwestern Europe, with its distribution including the British Isles—extending as far north as Anglesey in Wales and Angus in eastern Scotland—as well as Belgium, the Netherlands, and southern Sweden.

This species is primarily associated with sandy coastal habitats, particularly sand dunes. It exhibits a preference for well-drained, nutrient-poor, and often slightly calcareous sandy soils, where it can be found in open, often exposed, dune systems. The ecological conditions of these habitats, such as low competition from other vegetation and high light availability, are conducive to its growth and reproduction.
