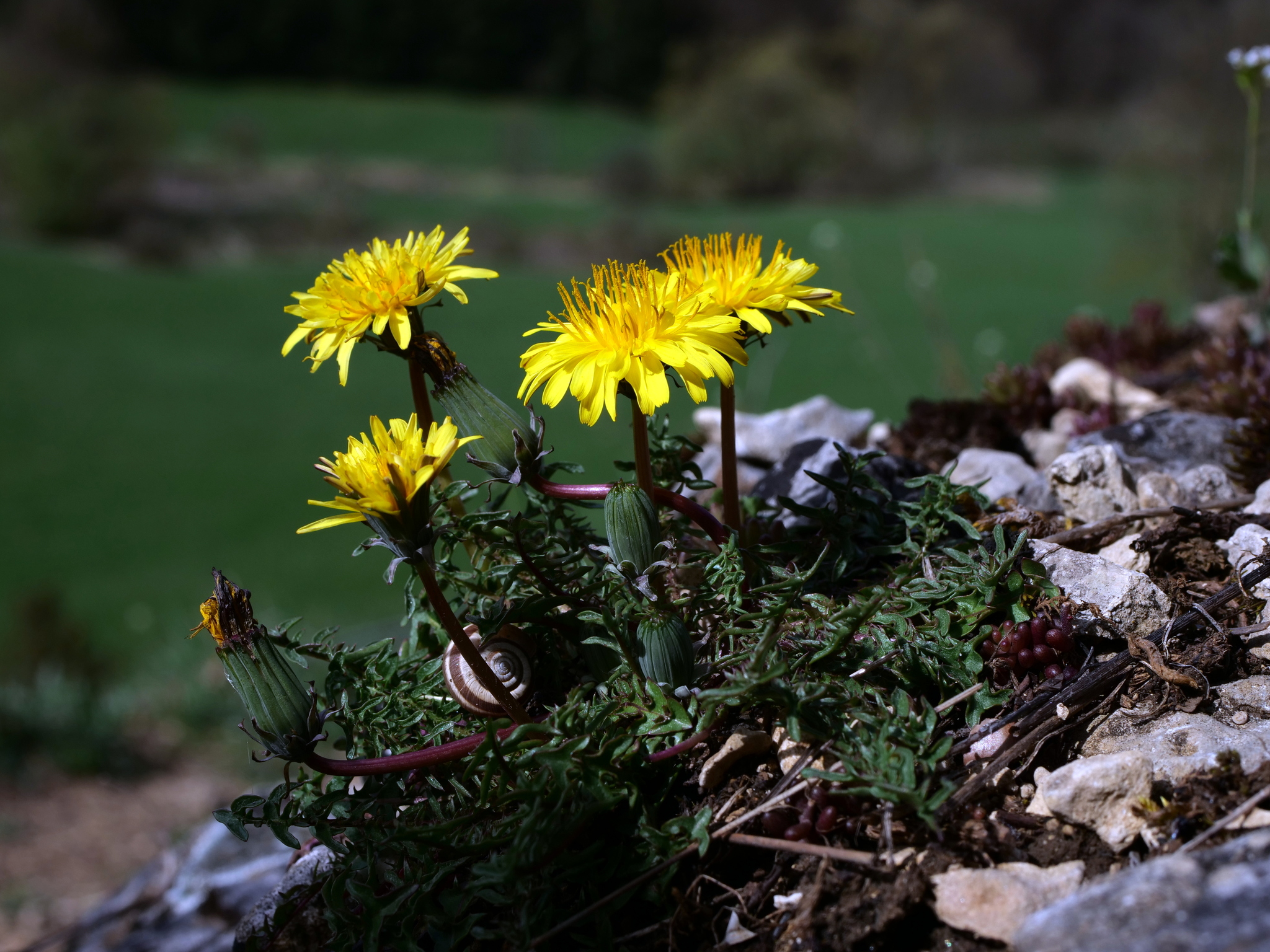

Scientific classification
- Kingdom: Plantae
- Clade: Tracheophytes
- Clade: Angiosperms
- Clade: Eudicots
- Clade: Asterids
- Order: Asterales
- Family: Asteraceae
- Genus: Taraxacum
- Species: T. rubicundum

Binomial name
- Taraxacum rubicundum (Dahlst.) Dahlst.

= Taraxacum rubicundum =

Species of flowering plant

Taraxacum rubicundum, also known as the ruddy dandelion is a perennial species of dandelion. The species is native to western, southern, and northern Europe. It grows primarily in temperate areas. The plant is seen primarily in spring from April to May and was first formally described in 1905.
