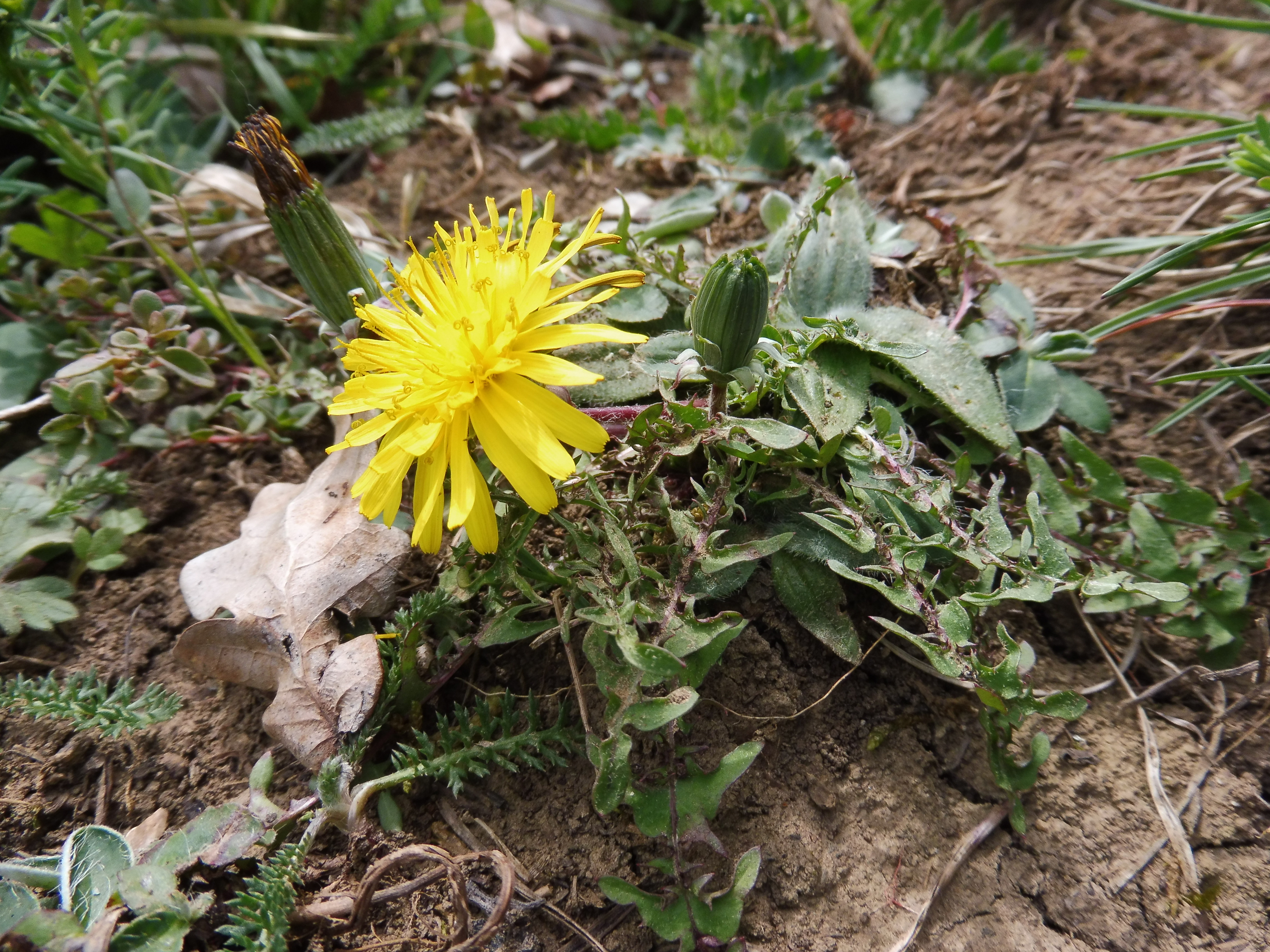

Scientific classification
- Kingdom: Plantae
- Clade: Tracheophytes
- Clade: Angiosperms
- Clade: Eudicots
- Clade: Asterids
- Order: Asterales
- Family: Asteraceae
- Genus: Taraxacum
- Species: T. tortilobum

Binomial name
- Taraxacum tortilobum Florstr.

= Taraxacum tortilobum =

Species of flowering plant

Taraxacum tortilobum, also known as the twisted-lobed dandelion, is a perennial species of dandelion in Taraxacum section Erythrosperma. The species was first formally described by Florström in 1914. It is native to temperate regions of Europe, with most records concentrated in western Europe, particularly the Netherlands and Belgium. The species is most commonly observed during the spring, especially between April and May. It is distinguished by its strongly crisped and toothed leaves with usually curled lateral lobes, pale yellow flower heads, and pale grey-brown achenes.

== Description ==
Taraxacum tortilobum is a small to medium-sized dandelion species reaching up to 15–20 cm in height. Plants possess a tunic and have pale red-purple, narrowly winged petioles. The leaves are greyish-green to light green and nearly hairless. They bear 4–6 lateral lobes that are patent or recurved, widened at the base, strongly crisped, and furnished with numerous filiform teeth. The terminal lobe ends in a tongue-shaped tip.

The scapes are approximately as long as the leaves and are green or faintly suffused with red-purple coloration. The outer involucral bracts are grey-green, often tinged purple, loosely adpressed to obliquely spreading, ovate to lanceolate in shape, and strongly purple at the apex. Flower heads are pale yellow and 3–4 cm in diameter. Ligules display grey-purple stripes, while the stigmas are grey-purple and the styles are exerted. Pollen is present.

The achenes are pale grey-brown, strongly crisped, and measure 4.7–5.3 mm including the cone. The achene body is spinulose in its upper portion.

== Taxonomy ==
Taraxacum tortilobum belongs to Taraxacum section Erythrosperma. It is placed within the Dissimilia group on the basis of its straw-coloured achenes. It is distinguished from other members of the section by its combination of pale grey-brown achenes, strongly crisped and toothed leaves, and lateral leaf lobes that are usually curled.

== Cytology ==
The species is triploid, with a chromosome number of 2n = 3x = 24. This chromosome count corresponds with populations studied in western Europe. An aneuploid count of 2n = 25 has also been reported from Spain.

== Distribution and habitat ==
Taraxacum tortilobum is a predominantly western European species. Most records originate from the Netherlands and Belgium, and it is also common in northern France, southwestern Germany, and Switzerland. Its range extends south to Corsica and west to the northwestern coast of France. The species has also been reported from southeastern United Kingdom, northwestern Spain, Germany, Denmark, Sweden, Finland, Estonia, and Latvia. In Poland, it has been recorded only from the city of Gdańsk.

The species grows on dry sandy soils, typically in semi-ruderal and slightly shaded habitats. In Gdańsk, the largest known population was found along a sandy path at the edge of a pine forest, where it occurred in association with Elymus repens.
