= Xanthium ambrosioides =

Scientific classification
- Kingdom: Plantae
- Clade: Embryophytes
- Clade: Tracheophytes
- Clade: Angiosperms
- Clade: Eudicots
- Clade: Asterids
- Order: Asterales
- Family: Asteraceae
- Tribe: Heliantheae
- Genus: Xanthium
- Species: X. ambrosioides

Binomial name
- Xanthium ambrosioides Hook. & Arn.

Species of flowering plant

Xanthium ambrosioides, the Argentine cocklebur, is a species of flowering plant in the family Asteraceae, native to Argentina, and introduced to Great Britain, France, Italy, and New South Wales. Some authorities consider it a synonym of Xanthium spinosum. It is a "Declared Pest, Prohibited" in Western Australia.
