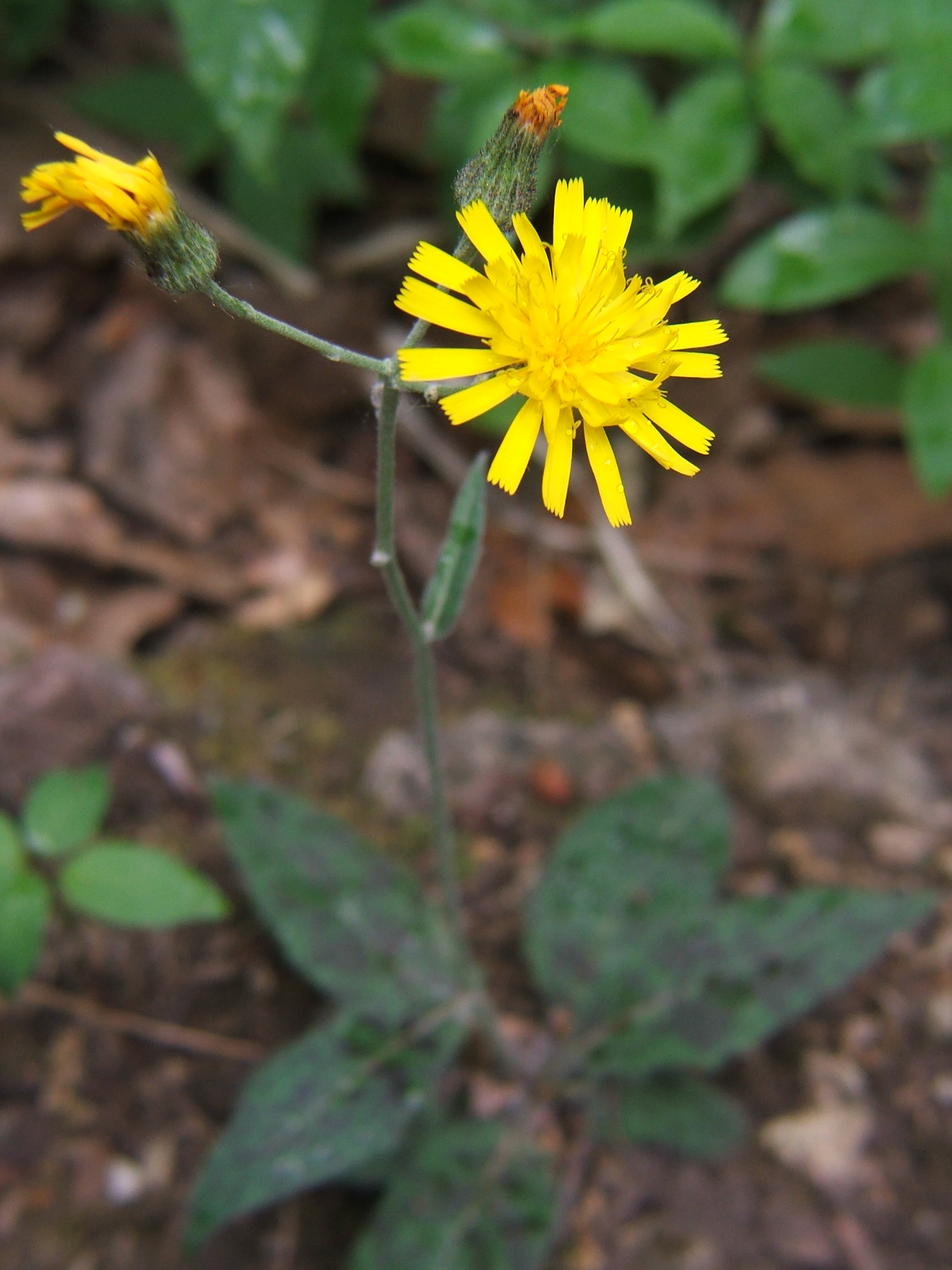
- Flowers

Scientific classification
- Kingdom: Plantae
- Clade: Tracheophytes
- Clade: Angiosperms
- Clade: Eudicots
- Clade: Asterids
- Order: Asterales
- Family: Asteraceae
- Genus: Hieracium
- Species: H. maculatum

Binomial name
- Hieracium maculatum Schrank

Subspecies
- Hieracium maculatum subsp. arenarium Hieracium maculatum subsp. martrinii Hieracium maculatum subsp. platybasis

= Hieracium maculatum =

Species of flowering plant

Hieracium maculatum, the spotted hawkweed, is a flowering plant species in the genus Hieracium found in Europe. It has been introduced in North America and is considered a weed in Canada.

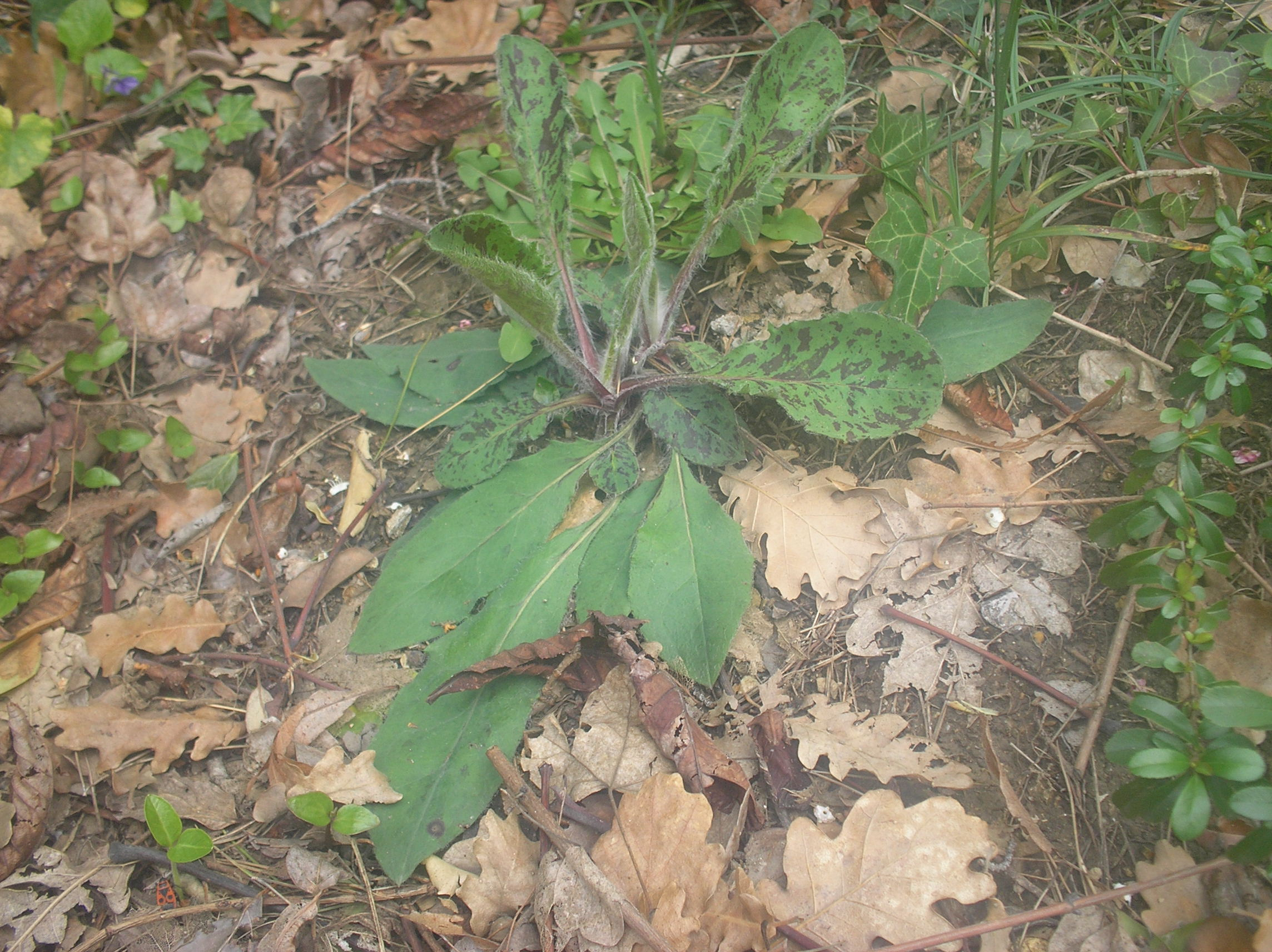
Rosette

== See also ==
- List of the vascular plants of Britain and Ireland 7
