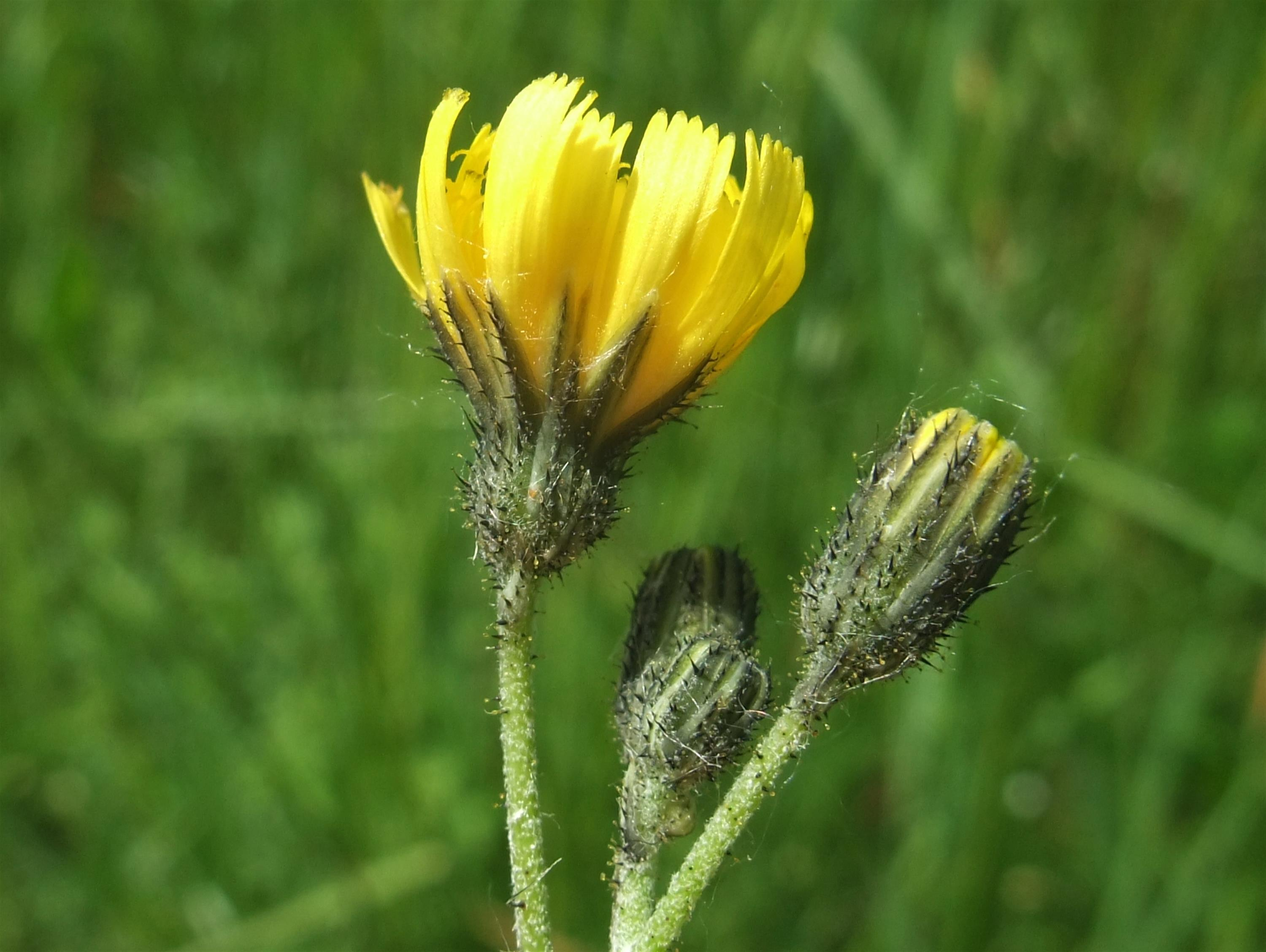

Scientific classification
- Kingdom: Plantae
- Clade: Tracheophytes
- Clade: Angiosperms
- Clade: Eudicots
- Clade: Asterids
- Order: Asterales
- Family: Asteraceae
- Genus: Pilosella
- Species: P. praealta

Binomial name
- Pilosella praealta (Vill. ex Cochn.) F.W.Schultz & Sch.Bip.

= Pilosella praealta =

Species of flowering plant

Pilosella praealta is a species of flowering plant belonging to the family Asteraceae.

Synonym:

- Pilosella praealta subsp. praealta
