= Taraxacum multicolorans =

Scientific classification
- Kingdom: Plantae
- Clade: Tracheophytes
- Clade: Angiosperms
- Clade: Eudicots
- Clade: Asterids
- Order: Asterales
- Family: Asteraceae
- Genus: Taraxacum
- Species: T. multicolorans

Binomial name
- Taraxacum multicolorans Hagend., Soest & Zevenb.

Species of flowering plant

Taraxacum multicolorans, also known as the many-coloured dandelion, is a species of dandelion. The species is native to northern and western Europe, but has also been introduced to British Columbia in Canada. T. multicolorans has dark green, erect, and narrowly-oblong leaves with dark blotches. Its petioles are typically a reddish colour. The leaves have two to four triangular side-lobes and toothed interlobes. Outer leaf tips are rounded, becoming longer and dentate near the center. The plant's bracts are greyish and broad, while the capitulum is dark yellow. The species was first described in 1972.
