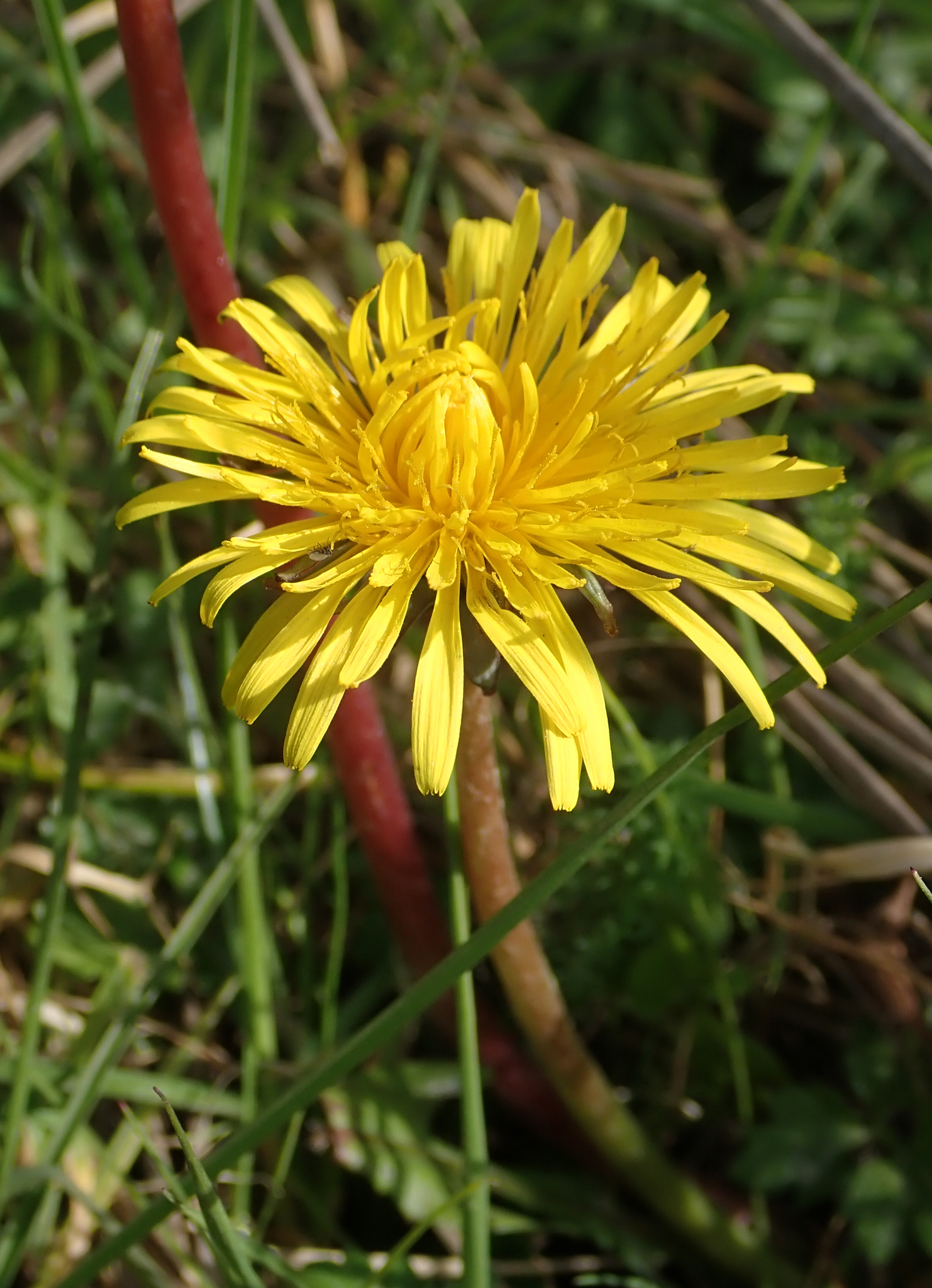
- A Taraxacum pseudohamatum flower head.

Scientific classification
- Kingdom: Plantae
- Clade: Tracheophytes
- Clade: Angiosperms
- Clade: Eudicots
- Clade: Asterids
- Order: Asterales
- Family: Asteraceae
- Genus: Taraxacum
- Species: T. pseudohamatum

Binomial name
- Taraxacum pseudohamatum Dahlst.

= Taraxacum pseudohamatum =

Species of flowering plant

Taraxacum pseudohamatum, also known by its common name the false hook-lobed dandelion, is a species of dandelion. Native to northern Europe, the species is also found in the Chatham Islands of New Zealand.

== Description ==
Taraxacum pseudohamatum is a stout, medium-sized dandelion. It can be distinguished from other dandelion species such as Taraxacum hamatum due to the presence of exterior bracts on the capitula.

== Taxonomy ==
The species was first described in 1932 by Gustav Adolf Hugo Dahlstedt.

== Ecology ==
The species flowers in the Southern Hemisphere from February to September. it is a perennial species that disburses seeds on the wind.

== Distribution and habitat ==
Taraxacum pseudohamatum abundantly grows in northern Europe and the British Isles, typically growing in grasslands, lawns and urban areas. In 2024, the species was discovered in the Chatham Islands of New Zealand, despite not being known to grow on the mainland of New Zealand.
