= Hieracium cambricogothicum =

Llanfairfechan hawkweed

Scientific classification
- Kingdom: Plantae
- Clade: Tracheophytes
- Clade: Angiosperms
- Clade: Eudicots
- Clade: Asterids
- Order: Asterales
- Family: Asteraceae
- Genus: Hieracium
- Species: H. cambricogothicum

Binomial name
- Hieracium cambricogothicum Pugsley

Species of plant

Hieracium cambricogothicum, the Llanfairfechan hawkweed, is an endemic British plant species within the family Asteraceae. It was first described by Herbert William Pugsley in 1948, who had found the species growing in walls in Llanfairfechan, Caernarfonshire, Wales. The species was subsequently also identified in Moray and Kent, although doubt exists around the identification of these occurrences.

Searches in 2004 and 2006 found no evidence for the species in any area in which the species has been found, and no living examples, seeds or plant material are known to exist in any collection. The species is therefore believed to be extinct. Hieracium is known for producing short-lived microspecies via polyploidy and apomixis.
