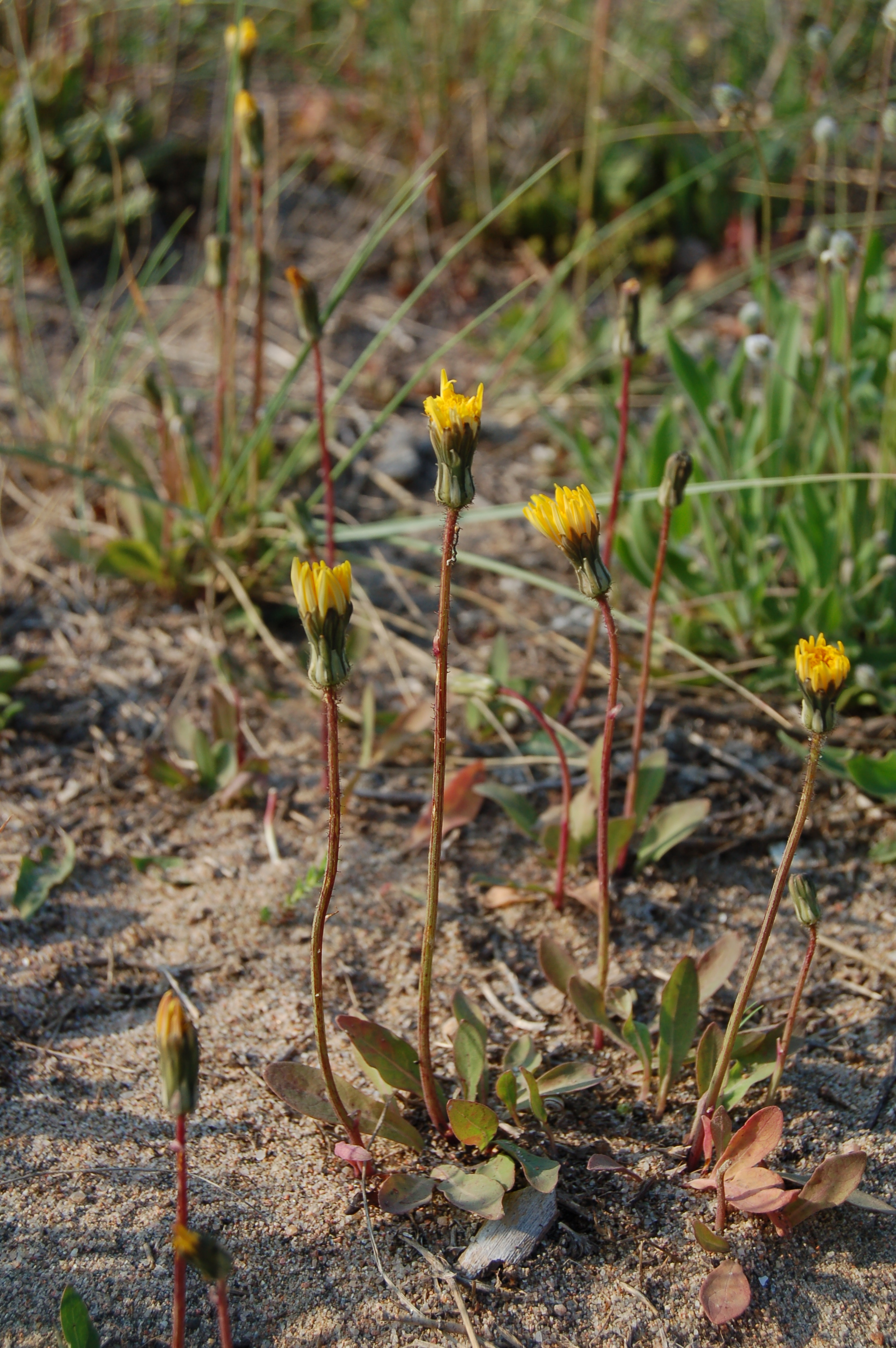

Scientific classification
- Kingdom: Plantae
- Clade: Embryophytes
- Clade: Tracheophytes
- Clade: Angiosperms
- Clade: Eudicots
- Clade: Asterids
- Order: Asterales
- Family: Asteraceae
- Tribe: Cichorieae
- Subtribe: Hyoseridinae
- Genus: Sonchus
- Species: S. bulbosus

Binomial name
- Sonchus bulbosus (L.) N.Kilian & Greuter

Subspecies
- Sonchus bulbosus subsp. bulbosus; Sonchus bulbosus subsp. microcephalus (Rech.f.) N.Kilian & Greuter; Sonchus bulbosus subsp. willkomii (Burnat & Barbey) N.Kilian & Greuter

Synonyms
- Aetheorhiza bulbosa (L.) Cass.; Crepis bulbosa (L.) Tausch; Hieracioides bulbosa (L.) Kuntze; Hieracium bulbosum (L.) Willd.; Hieracium stoloniferum Viv.; Hieracium tuberosum Brot.; Intybus bulbosus (L.) Fr.; Leontodon bulbosus L. (1753) (basionym); Prenanthes bulbosa (L.) DC.; Taraxacum bulbosum (L.) Rchb.; Troximon bulbosum (L.) Raf.

= Sonchus bulbosus =

Genus of flowering plants

Sonchus bulbosus, the tuberous hawk's-beard, is a species of flowering plant in the family Asteraceae. It is a tuberous geophyte native to the Mediterranean basin countries of southern Europe, Western Asia, and North Africa, as well as the Azores (Terceira) and Ireland.

Three subspecies are accepted.

- Sonchus bulbosus subsp. bulbosus (synonyms Hieracium stoloniferum Viv. and H. tuberosum Brot.) – Mediterranean basin, Azores (Terceira), and Ireland
- Sonchus bulbosus subsp. microcephalus (Rech.f.) N.Kilian & Greuter – Greece, Turkey, Cyprus, Lebanon, and Syria
- Sonchus bulbosus subsp. willkomii (Burnat & Barbey) N.Kilian & Greuter – Balearic Islands
