= Hieracium senescens =

Scientific classification
- Kingdom: Plantae
- Clade: Tracheophytes
- Clade: Angiosperms
- Clade: Eudicots
- Clade: Asterids
- Order: Asterales
- Family: Asteraceae
- Genus: Hieracium
- Species: H. senescens

Binomial name
- Hieracium senescens Backh.f.

Species of flowering plant

Hieracium senescens is a species of flowering plant belonging to the family Asteraceae.

Synonym:

- Hieracium senescens subsp. senescens
