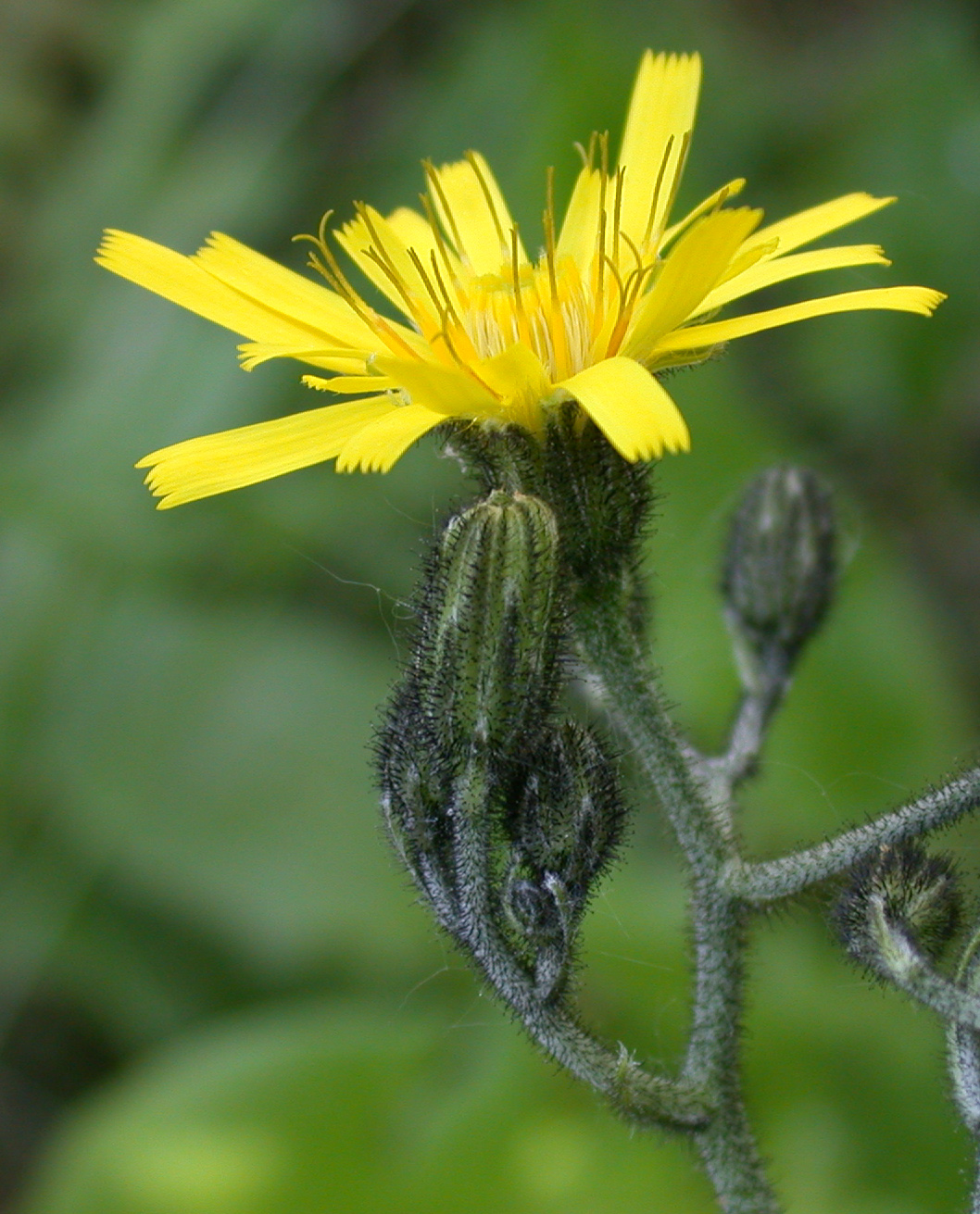

Scientific classification
- Kingdom: Plantae
- Clade: Tracheophytes
- Clade: Angiosperms
- Clade: Eudicots
- Clade: Asterids
- Order: Asterales
- Family: Asteraceae
- Genus: Hieracium
- Species: H. sylvularum

Binomial name
- Hieracium sylvularum Jord. ex Boreau

= Hieracium sylvularum =

Species of flowering plant

Hieracium sylvularum is a species of flowering plant belonging to the family Asteraceae.

Its native range is Europe to Caucasus.

Synonyms:

- Hieracium chrysomaurum Hyl.
- Hieracium grandidens Dahlst.
- Hieracium pseudograndidens Schljakov
