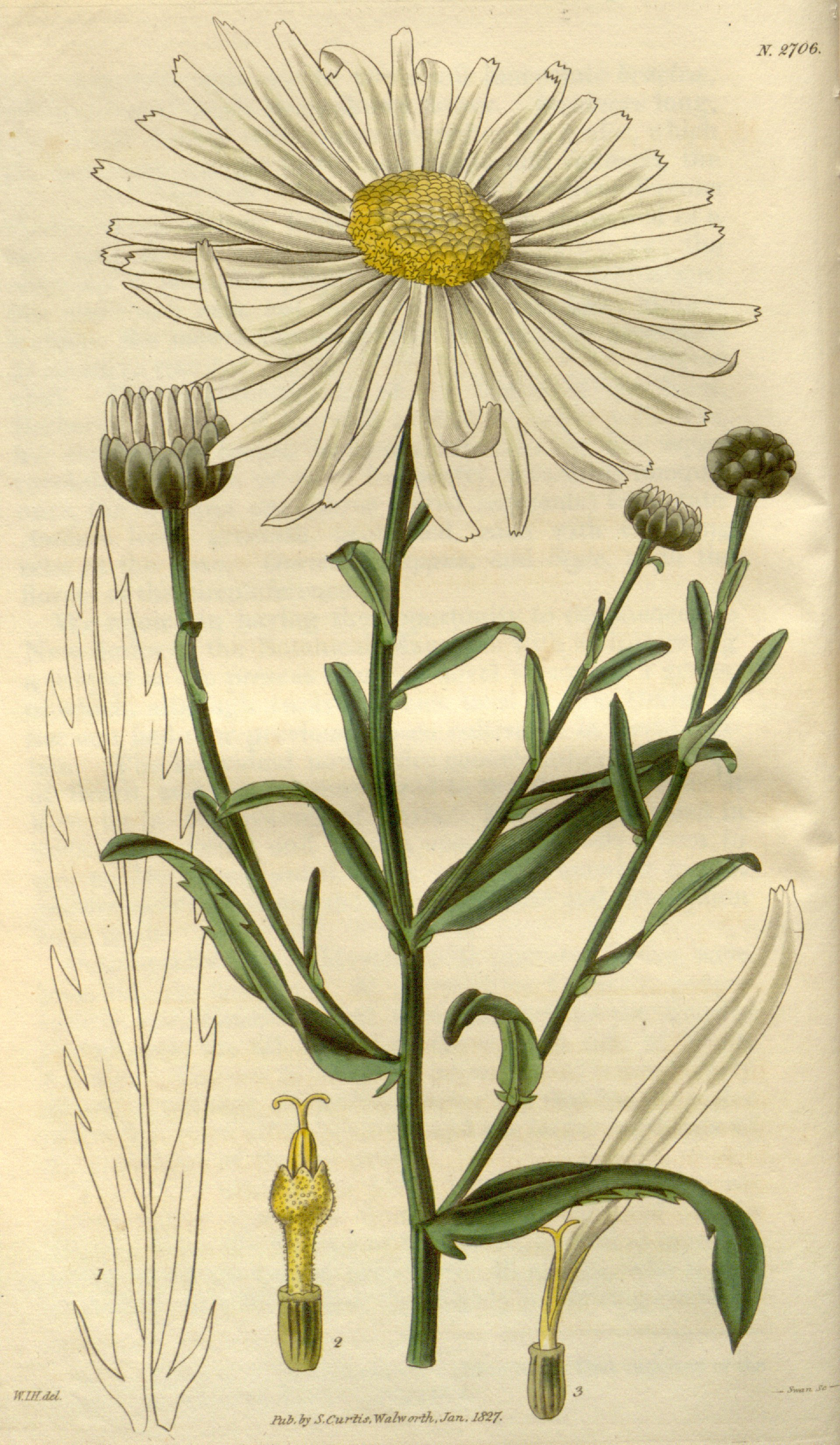
- Botanical illustration

Scientific classification
- Kingdom: Plantae
- Clade: Embryophytes
- Clade: Tracheophytes
- Clade: Angiosperms
- Clade: Eudicots
- Clade: Asterids
- Order: Asterales
- Family: Asteraceae
- Genus: Leucanthemella
- Species: L. serotina

Binomial name
- Leucanthemella serotina (L.) Tzvelev

Synonyms
- List: Chrysanthemum serotinum L.; Chrysanthemum uliginosum (Waldst. & Kit. ex Willd.) Pers.; Decaneurum serotinum (L.) Sch.Bip.; Leucanthemum serotinum (L.) Stankov; Matricaria serotina (L.) Desr.; Pyrethrum serotinum (L.) Willd.; Pyrethrum uliginosum Waldst. & Kit. ex Willd.; Tanacetum serotinum (L.) Sch.Bip.

= Leucanthemella serotina =

Species of flowering plant

Leucanthemella serotina, called the autumn ox-eye, is a species of flowering plant in the genus Leucanthemella, native to Poland, Czechia, Slovakia, Hungary, Serbia, Croatia, Slovenia, Montenegro, Bosnia and Herzegovina, Macedonia, Romania, Bulgaria, and Ukraine, and introduced to Connecticut, Massachusetts, Michigan, Minnesota and New York in the United States, Ontario and Québec in Canada, and France, Germany, Great Britain, and Switzerland. It is a vigorous, erect perennial growing to 1.5 m (5 ft) tall, bearing flowerheads with white ray florets and greenish-yellow centres, throughout autumn. It has gained the Royal Horticultural Society's Award of Garden Merit, and is also considered by them to be a good plant to attract pollinators.
