= Johannes Leendert van Soest =

Dutch engineer and botanist

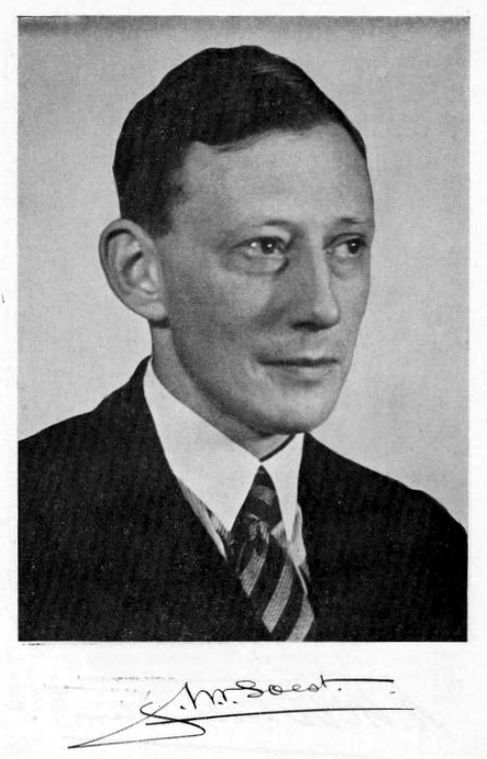
J. L. van Soest in 1950

Johannes Leendert van Soest (13 October 1898, the Hague –30 October 1983, Wassenaar) was a Dutch engineer and botanist renowned for his taraxacological work.

== Biography ==
J.L. van Soest graduated from the Technical College in Delft (now Delft University of Technology) in 1925. In 1927, he became the director of the Meetgebouw of the Defence Commission for Physical Armament. The Meetgebouw became the Physics Laboratory of the Dutch PTT during the German occupation period. From 1948 to 1963 he was the director of the TNO Physics Laboratory in The Hague. In 1949 he was appointed as a professor at the Delft Technical University. He retired in 1964.

In his spare time and after retirement he worked on botanical subjects, especially the genus Taraxacum (dandelions). He was awarded an honorary doctorate by the University of Utrecht for his botanical achievements.

He was an officer of the Order of Orange-Nassau.

== Scientific work ==
Van Soest was an internationally recognised authority in the genus Taraxacum. He described several hundred new species of dandelions. His herbarium (about 50,000 sheets) was donated to the Rijksherbarium at Leiden.
