= List of Alchemilla species =

Genus of flowering plants

The following species in the flowering plant genus Alchemilla, the lady's mantles, are accepted by Plants of the World Online. Alchemilla has many apomictic microspecies that are difficult to distinguish on the basis of morphology alone.

- Alchemilla abchasica Buser
- Alchemilla abramovii Czkalov
- Alchemilla abyssinica Fresen.
- Alchemilla achtarowii Pawl.
- Alchemilla acrodon S.E.Fröhner
- Alchemilla acropsila Rothm.
- Alchemilla acrostegia Plocek
- Alchemilla acuminatidens Buser
- Alchemilla acutata Buser
- Alchemilla acutidens Buser
- Alchemilla acutiformis S.E.Fröhner
- Alchemilla adelodictya Juz.
- Alchemilla aemula Juz.
- Alchemilla aenostipula Juz.
- Alchemilla aequatoriensis Rothm.
- Alchemilla aequidens Pawl.
- Alchemilla aggregata Buser
- Alchemilla alba S.E.Fröhner
- Alchemilla albanica Rothm.
- Alchemilla albinervia S.E.Fröhner
- Alchemilla alneti S.E.Fröhner
- Alchemilla alpigena Buser
- Alchemilla alpina L.
- Alchemilla alpinula S.E.Fröhner
- Alchemilla altaica Juz.
- Alchemilla amardica Rothm.
- Alchemilla amauroptera Plocek
- Alchemilla amblyodes Plocek
- Alchemilla amicorum Pawl.
- Alchemilla amoena (Czeczott) Rothm.
- Alchemilla amphiargyrea Buser
- Alchemilla amphibola Buser
- Alchemilla amphipsila Juz.
- Alchemilla amphisericea Buser
- Alchemilla anceps Plocek
- Alchemilla andina (L.M.Perry) J.F.Macbr.
- Alchemilla angustata S.E.Fröhner
- Alchemilla angustiserrata S.E.Fröhner
- Alchemilla animosa Plocek
- Alchemilla anisiaca Wettst.
- Alchemilla anisopoda Juz.
- Alchemilla antiropata S.E.Fröhner
- Alchemilla aperta Juz.
- Alchemilla aphanoides Mutis ex L.f.
- Alchemilla appressipila Juz.
- Alchemilla aranica S.E.Fröhner
- Alchemilla argentidens Buser
- Alchemilla arguteserrata H.Lindb. ex Juz.
- Alchemilla argyrophylla Oliv.
- Alchemilla armeniaca Rothm.
- Alchemilla aroanica (Buser) Rothm.
- Alchemilla arvensis (L.) Scop.
- Alchemilla aspera Plocek
- Alchemilla aspleniifolia Rothm.
- Alchemilla asteroantha Rothm.
- Alchemilla atlantica H.Lindb.
- Alchemilla atriuscula S.E.Fröhner
- Alchemilla atropurpurea S.E.Fröhner
- Alchemilla atrovirens Buser
- Alchemilla aurata Juz.
- Alchemilla auriculata Juz.
- Alchemilla australiana Rothm.
- Alchemilla australis (Rydb.) Bomble
- Alchemilla austroaltaica V.N.Tikhom.
- Alchemilla austroitalica Brullo, Scelsi & Spamp.
- Alchemilla babiogorensis Pawl.
- Alchemilla bachiti Hochst. ex Hauman & Balle
- Alchemilla bakeri De Wild.
- Alchemilla bakurianica Sosn.
- Alchemilla baltica Juz.
- Alchemilla bandericensis Pawl.
- Alchemilla barbata C.Presl
- Alchemilla barbatiflora Juz.
- Alchemilla benasquensis S.E.Fröhner
- Alchemilla bertiscea Martincic
- Alchemilla betuletorum Rothm.
- Alchemilla bicarpellata Rothm.
- Alchemilla bipinnatifida L.M.Perry
- Alchemilla biquadrata Juz.
- Alchemilla biradiata Ovcz.
- Alchemilla bogumilii Pawlus
- Alchemilla boleslai Pawl.
- Alchemilla bolusii De Wild.
- Alchemilla bombycina Rothm.
- Alchemilla bonae S.E.Fröhner
- Alchemilla borderei Buser ex S.E.Fröhner
- Alchemilla borealis Sam. ex Juz.
- Alchemilla bornmuelleri Rothm.
- Alchemilla brachetiana Buser
- Alchemilla brachycodon Plocek
- Alchemilla braun-blanquetii Pawl.
- Alchemilla brevidens Juz.
- Alchemilla breviloba H.Lindb.
- Alchemilla brevituba Juz.
- Alchemilla bucovinensis Sychak
- Alchemilla bulgarica Rothm.
- Alchemilla bungei Juz.
- Alchemilla burgensis S.E.Fröhner
- Alchemilla bursensis Pawl.
- Alchemilla buschii Juz.
- Alchemilla buseri Maill.
- Alchemilla buseriana Rothm.
- Alchemilla cadinensis Aymerich & L.Sáez
- Alchemilla calviflora Plocek
- Alchemilla calvifolia Juz.
- Alchemilla calviformis Ovcz.
- Alchemilla camptopoda Juz.
- Alchemilla canifolia S.E.Fröhner
- Alchemilla capensis Lam.
- Alchemilla capillacea Juz.
- Alchemilla carinthiaca S.E.Fröhner
- Alchemilla carniolica (Paulin) Fritsch
- Alchemilla cartalinica Juz.
- Alchemilla cartilaginea Rothm.
- Alchemilla cashmeriana Rothm.
- Alchemilla catachnoa Rothm.
- Alchemilla catalaunica Rothm.
- Alchemilla cataractarum S.E.Fröhner
- Alchemilla caucasica Buser
- Alchemilla cavillieri (Burnat) Pignatti
- Alchemilla ceroniana Buser
- Alchemilla chalarodesma Plocek
- Alchemilla charbonneliana Buser ex Charb.
- Alchemilla cheirochlora Juz.
- Alchemilla chilitricha Plocek
- Alchemilla chionophila Juz.
- Alchemilla chirophylla Buser
- Alchemilla chlorosericea (Buser) Juz.
- Alchemilla chthamalea Rothm.
- Alchemilla ciminensis Pawl.
- Alchemilla cinerea Buser
- Alchemilla circassica Juz.
- Alchemilla circularis Juz.
- Alchemilla circumdentata Juz.
- Alchemilla citrina S.E.Fröhner
- Alchemilla colorata Buser
- Alchemilla colura Hilliard
- Alchemilla commixta Juz.
- Alchemilla compactilis Juz.
- Alchemilla compta Buser
- Alchemilla condensa S.E.Fröhner
- Alchemilla confertula Juz.
- Alchemilla conglobata H.Lindb.
- Alchemilla conjuncta Bab.
- Alchemilla connivens Buser
- Alchemilla consobrina Juz.
- Alchemilla contractilis (Plocek) S.E.Fröhner
- Alchemilla controversa Jaquet ex Buser
- Alchemilla corcontica Plocek
- Alchemilla coriacea Buser
- Alchemilla cornucopioides (Lag.) Roem. & Schult.
- Alchemilla coruscans Buser
- Alchemilla crassa (Plocek) Plocek
- Alchemilla crassicaulis Juz.
- Alchemilla crebridens Juz.
- Alchemilla crenulata S.E.Fröhner
- Alchemilla crinita Buser
- Alchemilla croatica Gand.
- Alchemilla cryptantha Steud. ex A.Rich.
- Alchemilla cunctatrix Juz.
- Alchemilla cuneata Gaudin ex Monnard
- Alchemilla curaica Juz.
- Alchemilla curta S.E.Fröhner
- Alchemilla curtiloba Buser
- Alchemilla curtischista Plocek
- Alchemilla curvidens Juz.
- Alchemilla cymatophylla Juz.
- Alchemilla cyrtopleura Juz.
- Alchemilla czamsinensis V.N.Tikhom.
- Alchemilla czaryschensis Czkalov
- Alchemilla czywczynensis Pawl.
- Alchemilla daghestanica Juz.
- Alchemilla damianicensis Pawl.
- Alchemilla dasyclada Juz.
- Alchemilla dasycrater Juz.
- Alchemilla debilis Juz.
- Alchemilla decalvans Juz.
- Alchemilla decumbens Buser
- Alchemilla decurrens Plocek
- Alchemilla delitescens Plocek
- Alchemilla delphinensis Buser
- Alchemilla demissa Buser
- Alchemilla denticulata Juz.
- Alchemilla depexa Juz.
- Alchemilla devestiens Juz.
- Alchemilla dewildemanii T.C.E.Fr.
- Alchemilla deylii Plocek ex Soják
- Alchemilla diademata Rothm.
- Alchemilla diglossa Juz.
- Alchemilla diluta S.E.Fröhner
- Alchemilla diplophylla Diels
- Alchemilla divaricans Buser
- Alchemilla diversiloba Buser ex Dalla Torre & Sarnth.
- Alchemilla diversipes Juz.
- Alchemilla dolichotoma Plocek
- Alchemilla dombaica Juz.
- Alchemilla domingensis Urb.
- Alchemilla dostalii Plocek
- Alchemilla dura Buser
- Alchemilla dzhavakhetica Juz.
- Alchemilla echinogloba Plocek
- Alchemilla effusa Buser
- Alchemilla elata Buser
- Alchemilla elgonensis Mildbr.
- Alchemilla elisabethae Juz.
- Alchemilla ellenbeckii Engl.
- Alchemilla ellenbergiana Rothm.
- Alchemilla elongata Eckl. & Zeyh.
- Alchemilla epidasys Rothm.
- Alchemilla epipsila Juz.
- Alchemilla equisetiformis Trevir.
- Alchemilla erectilis Juz.
- Alchemilla ericoides L.M.Perry
- Alchemilla erodiifolia Wedd.
- Alchemilla erythropoda Juz.
- Alchemilla erythropodoides Pawl.
- Alchemilla erzincanensis Pawl.
- Alchemilla espotensis S.E.Fröhner
- Alchemilla eugenii Pawl.
- Alchemilla eurystoma S.E.Fröhner
- Alchemilla exaperta Plocek
- Alchemilla excentrica Zämelis
- Alchemilla exigua Buser
- Alchemilla exilis Juz.
- Alchemilla exsanguis Juz.
- Alchemilla exsculpta Juz.
- Alchemilla exuens Juz.
- Alchemilla exul Juz.
- Alchemilla faeroensis (Lange) Buser
- Alchemilla fagetii S.E.Fröhner
- Alchemilla fallax Buser
- Alchemilla farinosa S.E.Fröhner
- Alchemilla federiciana S.E.Fröhner
- Alchemilla filicaulis Buser
- Alchemilla firma Buser
- Alchemilla fischeri Engl.
- Alchemilla fissa Günther & Schummel
- Alchemilla fissimima Buser
- Alchemilla flabellata Buser
- Alchemilla flavescens Buser
- Alchemilla flavicoma Buser
- Alchemilla flavovirens Buser
- Alchemilla flexicaulis Buser
- Alchemilla floribunda Murb.
- Alchemilla florulenta Buser
- Alchemilla fluminea S.E.Fröhner
- Alchemilla fokinii Juz.
- Alchemilla fontinalis Juz.
- Alchemilla fontqueri Rothm.
- Alchemilla frigens Buser
- Alchemilla frigida Wedd.
- Alchemilla frondosa Juz.
- Alchemilla frost-olsenii S.E.Fröhner
- Alchemilla fulgens Buser
- Alchemilla fulgida S.E.Fröhner
- Alchemilla fulvescens (L.M.Perry) Rothm.
- Alchemilla fusoidea Plocek
- Alchemilla gaillardiana Buser
- Alchemilla galaninii Czkalov
- Alchemilla galioides Benth.
- Alchemilla galkinae S.E.Fröhner
- Alchemilla galpinii Hauman & Balle
- Alchemilla gemmia Buser
- Alchemilla georgica Juz.
- Alchemilla gibberulosa H.Lindb.
- Alchemilla giewontica Pawl.
- Alchemilla gigantodus S.E.Fröhner
- Alchemilla gingolphiana S.E.Fröhner
- Alchemilla glabra Neygenf.
- Alchemilla glabricaulis H.Lindb.
- Alchemilla glabriformis Juz.
- Alchemilla glacialis Buser
- Alchemilla glaucescens Wallr.
- Alchemilla glomerulans Buser
- Alchemilla glyphodonta Juz.
- Alchemilla goloskokovii Juz.
- Alchemilla gorcensis Pawl.
- Alchemilla gourzae Ibn Tattou
- Alchemilla grandiceps Plocek
- Alchemilla grandidens Juz.
- Alchemilla grenieri Guillot
- Alchemilla grisebachiana L.M.Perry
- Alchemilla grossheimii Juz.
- Alchemilla grossidens Buser
- Alchemilla gruneica Plocek
- Alchemilla guatemalensis Rothm.
- Alchemilla gymnopoda Plocek
- Alchemilla hagenia T.C.E.Fr.
- Alchemilla hamzaoglui Yild.
- Alchemilla haraldii Juz.
- Alchemilla haumanii Rothm.
- Alchemilla hebescens Juz.
- Alchemilla helenae Juz.
- Alchemilla helvetica Brügger
- Alchemilla hendrickxii Hauman & Balle
- Alchemilla heptagona Juz.
- Alchemilla hessii Rothm.
- Alchemilla heterophylla Rothm.
- Alchemilla heteropoda Buser
- Alchemilla heteroschista Juz.
- Alchemilla heterotricha Rothm.
- Alchemilla hians Juz.
- Alchemilla hildebrandtii Engl.
- Alchemilla hirsuticaulis H.Lindb.
- Alchemilla hirsutiflora (Buser) Rothm.
- Alchemilla hirsutissima Juz.
- Alchemilla hirsutopetiolata (De Wild.) Rothm.
- Alchemilla hirta (L.M.Perry) Rothm.
- Alchemilla hirtipedicellata Juz.
- Alchemilla hirtipes Buser
- Alchemilla hispanica S.E.Fröhner
- Alchemilla hispidula L.M.Perry
- Alchemilla hissarica Ovcz. & Kochk.
- Alchemilla holocycla Rothm.
- Alchemilla holosericea L.M.Perry
- Alchemilla homoeophylla Juz.
- Alchemilla hoppeana (Rchb.) Dalla Torre
- Alchemilla hoppeaniformis S.E.Fröhner
- Alchemilla hoverlensis Pawlus & Lovelius
- Alchemilla humilicaulis Juz.
- Alchemilla hybrida (L.) L.
- Alchemilla hyperborea Juz.
- Alchemilla hypercycla S.E.Fröhner
- Alchemilla hyperptycha Plocek
- Alchemilla hypochlora Juz.
- Alchemilla hypotricha Juz.
- Alchemilla hyrcana (Buser) Juz.
- Alchemilla ilerdensis S.E.Fröhner
- Alchemilla imberbis Juz.
- Alchemilla impedicellata S.E.Fröhner
- Alchemilla impexa Buser
- Alchemilla impolita Juz.
- Alchemilla incisa Buser
- Alchemilla inconcinna Buser
- Alchemilla incurvata Gand.
- Alchemilla indica Gardner
- Alchemilla indivisa (Formánek ex Buser) Rothm.
- Alchemilla indurata Juz.
- Alchemilla infravallesia (Buser) Rothm.
- Alchemilla iniquiformis S.E.Fröhner
- Alchemilla insignis Juz.
- Alchemilla integribasis Juz.
- Alchemilla inversa Juz.
- Alchemilla iratiana S.E.Fröhner
- Alchemilla iremelica Juz.
- Alchemilla ischnocarpa S.E.Fröhner
- Alchemilla isfarensis Ovcz. & Kochk.
- Alchemilla isodonta Plocek
- Alchemilla jailae Juz.
- Alchemilla jamesonii L.M.Perry
- Alchemilla japonica Nakai & H.Hara
- Alchemilla jaquetiana Buser
- Alchemilla jaroschenkoi Grossh.
- Alchemilla jasiewiczii Pawl.
- Alchemilla johnstonii Oliv.
- Alchemilla jugensis (Buser) Maill.
- Alchemilla jumrukczalica Pawl.
- Alchemilla kemlensis Czkalov
- Alchemilla kerneri Janch. ex Rothm.
- Alchemilla killipii Rothm.
- Alchemilla kiwuensis Engl.
- Alchemilla kolaensis Juz.
- Alchemilla kornasiana Pawl.
- Alchemilla kosiarensis Plocek
- Alchemilla kozlovskii Juz.
- Alchemilla krassovskiana Czkalov
- Alchemilla krylovii Juz.
- Alchemilla kulczynskii Pawl.
- Alchemilla kurdica Rothm.
- Alchemilla kvarkushensis Juz.
- Alchemilla ladislai Pawl.
- Alchemilla laeta Juz.
- Alchemilla laeticolor Juz.
- Alchemilla laevipes Plocek
- Alchemilla lainzii S.E.Fröhner
- Alchemilla languescens Juz.
- Alchemilla languida Buser
- Alchemilla lanuginosa Rothm.
- Alchemilla lasenii S.E.Fröhner
- Alchemilla laxa Plocek
- Alchemilla laxescens Czkalov
- Alchemilla lechleriana Griseb.
- Alchemilla ledebourii Juz.
- Alchemilla legionensis S.E.Fröhner
- Alchemilla leiophylla Juz.
- Alchemilla leptoclada Buser
- Alchemilla lessingiana Juz.
- Alchemilla leutei S.E.Fröhner
- Alchemilla lindbergiana Juz.
- Alchemilla lineata Buser
- Alchemilla lipschitzii Lipsch. ex Juz.
- Alchemilla lithophila Juz.
- Alchemilla litwinowii Juz.
- Alchemilla longana Buser
- Alchemilla longidens Plocek
- Alchemilla longinodis (Buser) Maill.
- Alchemilla longipes Juz.
- Alchemilla longituba S.E.Fröhner
- Alchemilla longiuscula Buser
- Alchemilla looseri Rothm.
- Alchemilla lorata Plocek
- Alchemilla loxotropa Plocek
- Alchemilla lucida Buser
- Alchemilla ludovitiana Plocek
- Alchemilla lunaria S.E.Fröhner
- Alchemilla lycopodioides Trevir.
- Alchemilla lydiae Zämelis
- Alchemilla macrescens Juz.
- Alchemilla macrochira S.E.Fröhner
- Alchemilla macroclada Juz.
- Alchemilla madurensis (Rothm.) K.M.Purohit & Panigrahi
- Alchemilla malimontana Juz.
- Alchemilla malyi Rothm. ex K.Malý
- Alchemilla mandoniana Wedd.
- Alchemilla maradykovensis Czkalov
- Alchemilla marginata Plocek
- Alchemilla maroccana (Hyl. & Rothm.) Devesa
- Alchemilla marsica Buser
- Alchemilla martinii S.E.Fröhner
- Alchemilla mastodonta Juz.
- Alchemilla matreiensis S.E.Fröhner
- Alchemilla maureri S.E.Fröhner
- Alchemilla mazandarana Naqinezhad & S.E.Fröhner
- Alchemilla megalodonta Plocek
- Alchemilla melancholica S.E.Fröhner
- Alchemilla melanoscytos S.E.Fröhner
- Alchemilla micans Buser
- Alchemilla michelsonii Juz.
- Alchemilla microbetula T.C.E.Fr.
- Alchemilla microcarpa Boiss. & Reut.
- Alchemilla microcephala S.E.Fröhner
- Alchemilla microdictya Juz.
- Alchemilla microdonta Juz.
- Alchemilla microscopica S.E.Fröhner
- Alchemilla microsphaerica S.E.Fröhner
- Alchemilla mininzonii Czkalov
- Alchemilla minusculiflora Buser
- Alchemilla minutidens Buser
- Alchemilla minutiflora Azn.
- Alchemilla mollifolia Plocek & Zlinska
- Alchemilla mollis (Buser) Rothm.
- Alchemilla moncophila Plocek
- Alchemilla montenegrina Plocek
- Alchemilla monticola Opiz
- Alchemilla montserratii S.E.Fröhner
- Alchemilla moritziana (Dammer) L.M.Perry
- Alchemilla multidens Buser
- Alchemilla multiloba Plocek
- Alchemilla murbeckiana Buser
- Alchemilla murisserica Maill.
- Alchemilla mutisii Rothm.
- Alchemilla mystrostigma S.E.Fröhner
- Alchemilla nafarroana S.E.Fröhner
- Alchemilla natalensis Engl.
- Alchemilla neglecta Rothm.
- Alchemilla nemoralis Alechin
- Alchemilla nietofelineri S.E.Fröhner
- Alchemilla niphogeton Buser ex Pamp.
- Alchemilla nitida Buser
- Alchemilla nivalis Kunth
- Alchemilla norica S.E.Fröhner
- Alchemilla nudans S.E.Fröhner
- Alchemilla nydeggeriana S.E.Fröhner
- Alchemilla obconiciflora Juz.
- Alchemilla obesa Plocek
- Alchemilla obscura Buser
- Alchemilla obsoleta S.E.Fröhner
- Alchemilla obtegens Juz.
- Alchemilla obtusa Buser
- Alchemilla obtusiformis Alechin
- Alchemilla oculimarina Pawl.
- Alchemilla oirotica Czkalov
- Alchemilla oligantha Juz.
- Alchemilla oligotricha Juz.
- Alchemilla omalophylla Juz.
- Alchemilla opaca Buser
- Alchemilla ophioreina Juz.
- Alchemilla orbicans Juz.
- Alchemilla orbiculata Ruiz & Pav.
- Alchemilla orduensis Pawl.
- Alchemilla oriturcica Pawl.
- Alchemilla orizabensis (Rydb.) Fedde
- Alchemilla orthotricha Rothm.
- Alchemilla oscensis S.E.Fröhner
- Alchemilla othmarii Buser
- Alchemilla oxyodonta (Buser) G.C.Westerl.
- Alchemilla oxysepala Juz.
- Alchemilla ozana S.E.Fröhner
- Alchemilla pachyphylla Juz.
- Alchemilla paeneglabra Juz.
- Alchemilla paicheana (Buser) Rothm.
- Alchemilla pallens Buser
- Alchemilla paludicola Rothm.
- Alchemilla panigrahiana K.M.Purohit
- Alchemilla parcipila Juz.
- Alchemilla parijae Panigrahi & K.M.Purohit
- Alchemilla parodii I.M.Johnst.
- Alchemilla pascualis Juz.
- Alchemilla patens Plocek
- Alchemilla paupercula S.E.Fröhner
- Alchemilla pavlovii Juz.
- Alchemilla pawlowskii Assenov
- Alchemilla pectinata Kunth
- Alchemilla pectiniloba S.E.Fröhner
- Alchemilla pedata Hochst. ex A.Rich.
- Alchemilla pedicellata Rothm.
- Alchemilla pentaphyllea L.
- Alchemilla pentaphylloides Buser
- Alchemilla perglabra Alechin
- Alchemilla peristerica Pawl.
- Alchemilla perrieri De Wild.
- Alchemilla perryana Rothm.
- Alchemilla persica Rothm.
- Alchemilla perspicua S.E.Fröhner
- Alchemilla petiolulans (Buser ex E.G.Camus) Buser
- Alchemilla petraea Buser ex Maill.
- Alchemilla phalacropoda Juz.
- Alchemilla phegophila Juz.
- Alchemilla philonotis S.E.Fröhner
- Alchemilla pilosiplica Juz.
- Alchemilla pinguis Juz.
- Alchemilla pinnata Ruiz & Pav.
- Alchemilla pirinica Pawl.
- Alchemilla platygyria S.E.Fröhner
- Alchemilla plicata Buser
- Alchemilla plicatissima S.E.Fröhner
- Alchemilla plicatula Gand.
- Alchemilla pogonophora Juz.
- Alchemilla polatschekiana S.E.Fröhner
- Alchemilla polemochora S.E.Fröhner
- Alchemilla polessica Tretjakov
- Alchemilla polita S.E.Fröhner
- Alchemilla polonica Pawl.
- Alchemilla polychroma S.E.Fröhner
- Alchemilla polylepis Wedd.
- Alchemilla porrectidens Juz.
- Alchemilla prasina Juz.
- Alchemilla procerrima S.E.Fröhner
- Alchemilla procumbens Rose
- Alchemilla propinqua H.Lindb. ex Juz.
- Alchemilla pseudincisa Pawl.
- Alchemilla pseudobungeana Czkalov
- Alchemilla pseudocalycina Juz.
- Alchemilla pseudocartalinica Juz.
- Alchemilla pseudodecumbens Hügin & S.E.Fröhner
- Alchemilla pseudothmari Pawl.
- Alchemilla pseudovenusta Rothm.
- Alchemilla psilocaula Juz.
- Alchemilla psilomischa Rothm.
- Alchemilla psiloneura Juz.
- Alchemilla purdiei L.M.Perry
- Alchemilla purohitii Lakshmin., Bandyop. & Chand.Gupta
- Alchemilla pusilla Pomel
- Alchemilla pustynensis Czkalov
- Alchemilla pycnantha Juz.
- Alchemilla pycnoloba Juz.
- Alchemilla pycnotricha Juz.
- Alchemilla quinqueloba Rothm.
- Alchemilla racemulosa Buser
- Alchemilla raddeana (Buser) Juz.
- Alchemilla radiisecta Buser
- Alchemilla ramosissima Rothm.
- Alchemilla ranunculoides L.M.Perry
- Alchemilla reflexa Frost-Ols.
- Alchemilla rehmannii Engl.
- Alchemilla reniformis Buser
- Alchemilla repens C.Presl
- Alchemilla resupinata Rothm.
- Alchemilla retinerviformis Juz.
- Alchemilla retinervis Buser
- Alchemilla retropilosa Juz.
- Alchemilla reversantha Plocek
- Alchemilla rhiphaea Juz.
- Alchemilla rhodobasis Plocek
- Alchemilla rhodocycla Plocek
- Alchemilla rhododendrophila Buser
- Alchemilla rivulorum Rothm.
- Alchemilla rizensis Pawl.
- Alchemilla roccatii Cortesi
- Alchemilla rubens Lipsch. ex Juz.
- Alchemilla rubidula Plocek
- Alchemilla rubricaulis Juz.
- Alchemilla rubristipula Buser
- Alchemilla rugulosa S.E.Fröhner
- Alchemilla rupestris Kunth
- Alchemilla rusbyi L.M.Perry
- Alchemilla rutenbergii O.Hoffm.
- Alchemilla sabauda Buser
- Alchemilla saliceti S.E.Fröhner
- Alchemilla samuelssonii Rothm. ex S.E.Fröhner
- Alchemilla sandiensis Pilg.
- Alchemilla sanguinolenta Juz.
- Alchemilla santanderiensis S.E.Fröhner
- Alchemilla sarmatica Juz.
- Alchemilla sarmentosa L.M.Perry
- Alchemilla sauri Juz.
- Alchemilla saxatilis Buser
- Alchemilla saxetana Buser
- Alchemilla scalaris Juz.
- Alchemilla schischkinii Juz.
- Alchemilla schistophylla Juz.
- Alchemilla schizophylla Baker
- Alchemilla schlechteriana Rothm.
- Alchemilla schmakovii Czkalov
- Alchemilla schmidelyana Buser
- Alchemilla sciadiophylla Rothm.
- Alchemilla sciura M.Lynes
- Alchemilla sedelmeyeriana Juz.
- Alchemilla sejuncta Plocek
- Alchemilla semidivisa Ericsson
- Alchemilla semilunaris Alechin
- Alchemilla semisecta Buser
- Alchemilla semispoliata Juz.
- Alchemilla serbica (Paulin) Pawl.
- Alchemilla sergii V.N.Tikhom.
- Alchemilla sericata Rchb.
- Alchemilla sericata Rchb. ex Buser
- Alchemilla sericea Willd.
- Alchemilla sericoneura Buser
- Alchemilla sericoneuroides Pawl.
- Alchemilla serratisaxatilis S.E.Fröhner
- Alchemilla sevangensis Juz.
- Alchemilla sibbaldiifolia Kunth
- Alchemilla sibirica Zämelis
- Alchemilla sibthorpioides (Hook.f.) Panigrahi & K.M.Purohit
- Alchemilla sierrae Romo
- Alchemilla sintenisii Rothm.
- Alchemilla sinuata Buser
- Alchemilla sirjaevii Plocek
- Alchemilla smaragdina Plocek
- Alchemilla smirnovii Juz.
- Alchemilla smytniensis Pawl.
- Alchemilla snarskisii Czerep.
- Alchemilla sojakii Plocek
- Alchemilla sokolowskii Pawl.
- Alchemilla spathulata S.E.Fröhner
- Alchemilla speciosa Buser
- Alchemilla spectabilior S.E.Fröhner
- Alchemilla splendens Christ
- Alchemilla sprucei L.M.Perry
- Alchemilla squarrosula Buser
- Alchemilla standleyi L.M.Perry
- Alchemilla stanislaae Pawl.
- Alchemilla stellaris Juz.
- Alchemilla stellulata Juz.
- Alchemilla stenantha Juz.
- Alchemilla stenoleuca Plocek
- Alchemilla stevenii Buser
- Alchemilla stichotricha Juz.
- Alchemilla stiriaca S.E.Fröhner
- Alchemilla straminea Buser
- Alchemilla stricta Rothm.
- Alchemilla strictissima Juz.
- Alchemilla strigosula Buser
- Alchemilla stuhlmannii Engl.
- Alchemilla suavis Plocek
- Alchemilla subalpina S.E.Fröhner
- Alchemilla subcrenata Buser
- Alchemilla subcrenatiformis Juz.
- Alchemilla subcrispata Juz.
- Alchemilla suberectipila Juz.
- Alchemilla subglobosa G.C.Westerl.
- Alchemilla subnivalis Baker f.
- Alchemilla subsericea Reut.
- Alchemilla subsessilis Plocek
- Alchemilla subsplendens Buser
- Alchemilla substrigosa Juz.
- Alchemilla sukaczevii V.N.Tikhom.
- Alchemilla superata Plocek
- Alchemilla supina Juz.
- Alchemilla surculosa S.E.Fröhner
- Alchemilla szaferi Pawl.
- Alchemilla tacikii Plocek
- Alchemilla taernaensis Hyl. ex Ericsson & Hellqv.
- Alchemilla tamarae Juz.
- Alchemilla taurica (Buser) Juz.
- Alchemilla tenerifolia S.E.Fröhner
- Alchemilla tenerrima S.E.Fröhner
- Alchemilla tenuis Buser
- Alchemilla thaumasia Plocek
- Alchemilla tianschanica Juz.
- Alchemilla tichomirovii Czkalov
- Alchemilla tirolensis Buser ex Dalla Torre & Sarnth.
- Alchemilla tiryalensis Pawl.
- Alchemilla transcaucasica Rothm.
- Alchemilla transiens (Buser) Buser
- Alchemilla transiliensis Juz.
- Alchemilla transpolaris Juz.
- Alchemilla tredecimloba Buser
- Alchemilla trichocrater Juz.
- Alchemilla triphylla Rothm.
- Alchemilla trollii Rothm.
- Alchemilla trullata Buser
- Alchemilla trunciloba Buser
- Alchemilla tubulosa Juz.
- Alchemilla turkulensis Pawl.
- Alchemilla turuchanica Juz.
- Alchemilla tytthantha Juz.
- Alchemilla tzvelevii Czkalov
- Alchemilla undulata Buser
- Alchemilla uniflora (Maguire) Govaerts
- Alchemilla urceolata Juz.
- Alchemilla vaccariana Buser
- Alchemilla valdehirsuta Buser
- Alchemilla velutina S.Watson
- Alchemilla venosa Juz.
- Alchemilla venosula Buser
- Alchemilla ventiana V.N.Tikhom.
- Alchemilla venusta Cham. & Schltdl.
- Alchemilla verae Ovcz. & Kochk.
- Alchemilla veronicae Juz.
- Alchemilla versipila Buser
- Alchemilla versipiloides Pawl.
- Alchemilla verticillata Fielding & Gardner
- Alchemilla vetteri Buser
- Alchemilla villarii S.E.Fröhner
- Alchemilla villosa Jungh.
- Alchemilla vinacea Juz.
- Alchemilla vincekii Plocek
- Alchemilla virginea Plocek
- Alchemilla viridiflora Rothm.
- Alchemilla viridifolia Snarskis
- Alchemilla vizcayensis S.E.Fröhner
- Alchemilla volkensii Engl.
- Alchemilla vorotnikovii Czkalov
- Alchemilla vranicensis Pawl.
- Alchemilla vulcanica Cham. & Schltdl.
- Alchemilla vulgaris L.
- Alchemilla walasii Pawl.
- Alchemilla wallischii Pawl.
- Alchemilla weberi S.E.Fröhner
- Alchemilla westermaieri Jaquet
- Alchemilla wichurae (Buser) Stefánsson
- Alchemilla williamsii L.M.Perry
- Alchemilla wischniewskii Rothm.
- Alchemilla woodii Kuntze
- Alchemilla xanthochlora Rothm.
- Alchemilla ypsilotoma Rothm.
- Alchemilla zapalowiczii Pawl.
- Alchemilla ziganadagensis Pawl.
- Alchemilla zimoenkensis Czkalov
- Alchemilla zmudae Pawl.
- Alchemilla zolotuchinii Czkalov
