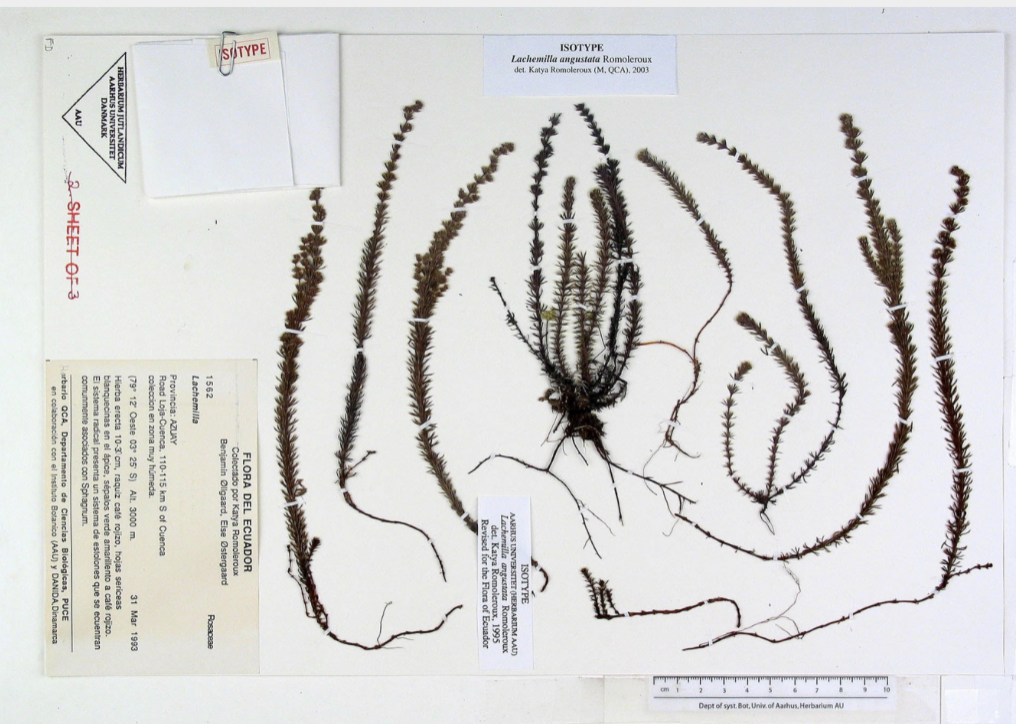

Conservation status
- Vulnerable (IUCN 3.1)

Scientific classification
- Kingdom: Plantae
- (unranked): Angiosperms
- (unranked): Eudicots
- (unranked): Rosids
- Order: Rosales
- Family: Rosaceae
- Genus: Lachemilla
- Species: L. angustata

Binomial name
- Lachemilla angustata Romol.

= Lachemilla angustata =

Species of flowering plant

Lachemilla angustata is a species of plant in the family Rosaceae. It is endemic to Ecuador. As of February 2023, the genus Lachemilla was included in Alchemilla by Plants of the World Online, with Lachemilla angustata treated as "unplaced". Alchemilla angustata S.E.Fröhner is a different species, native to the Pyrenees.
