= Common lady's mantle =

Common lady's mantle is a common name for several plants and may refer to:

- Alchemilla mollis
- Alchemilla vulgaris
- Clitoria ternatea
