= NCC =

NCC may refer to:

== Biology ==
- Neural correlates of consciousness, neuronal events and mechanisms relating to perception phenomena
- Sodium-chloride symporter, abbreviated as NCC

== Companies ==
- National Certification Corporation, a nursing specialty certification company
- National City Corporation, a leading US bank
- NCC AB, a Swedish construction company
- NCC Bank, a Bangladeshi bank
- Nagasaki Culture Telecasting, a Japanese commercial broadcaster
- NCC Group, a British information assurance and cyber security firm
- North Cork Creameries, an Irish agricultural cooperative and creamery

== Computers ==
- National Computer Camps, United States
- National Computer Conference, United States, 1970s and 1980s
- National Computing Centre, in the United Kingdom

== Culture ==
=== Broadcasting ===
- National Communications Commission, an independent statutory agency in Taiwan
- Nagasaki Culture Telecasting, a television station in Nagasaki Prefecture, Japan
- Nigerian Communications Commission, a telecommunication regulatory body for Nigeria

=== Fiction ===
- Starfleet starship registry prefix in the Star Trek series

=== Sport ===
- Nebraska College Conference, a former college athletics conference in the United States
- New Caledonia Cup, national association football cup of New Caledonia
- Nondescripts Cricket Club, Colombo, Sri Lanka
- Nordic Challenge Cup, a sports car racing series
- North Central Conference, a former college athletics conference in the United States
- Norwood Cycling Club, Adelaide, South Australia
- Northamptonshire Cricket Club, a UK sporting team

=== Video games ===
- Nintendo Challenge Championship

== Education ==
=== United Kingdom ===
- New City College in London, England
- NCC Education, United Kingdom

=== United States ===
- Nashua Community College in Nashua, New Hampshire
- Nassau Community College in Nassau County, New York
- Newport Central Catholic High School, Kentucky
- North Central College, Naperville, Illinois
- Norwalk Community College, Connecticut
- Northampton Community College in Bethlehem, Pennsylvania
- Nutrition Coordinating Center at the University of Minnesota School of Public Health

=== Elsewhere ===
- Nicholson Catholic College, Belleville, Ontario, Canada
- Northern Christian College, Laoag City, Ilocos Norte, Philippines
- National Communications Coordinator on a university Residence Hall Association

== Nature conservation ==
- Nature Conservancy of Canada
- Nature Conservancy Council, UK, 1973–1991
- AUB Nature Conservation Center, American University of Beirut
- National Conservation Commission, Barbados

== Non-government organizations ==
=== United States ===
- National Chicken Council, in the United States
- National Constitution Center located in Philadelphia, Pennsylvania
- National Coordinating Center for Communications, a branch of the United States National Cybersecurity and Communications Integration Center

=== Elsewhere ===
- Israel National Council for the Child, Israeli children's rights advocacy organization
- Nature Conservancy Council, a former public body in the United Kingdom

== Politics and government ==
=== Australia ===
- National Civic Council, an Australian political movement
- National COVID-19 Commission Advisory Board, Australian Government board

=== Canada ===
- National Capital Commission, a Canadian federal crown corporation
- National Citizens Coalition, a right-wing political organization in Canada

=== South Africa ===
- National Coloured Congress, a South African political party
- National Communications Centre, a South African intelligence agency

=== United Kingdom ===
- Natural Capital Committee, an independent body advising England's government on valuing and managing nature
- National Conservative Convention, a UK most senior body of the Conservative Party
- Newport City Council, a Welsh local government body
- Northamptonshire County Council, a defunct UK local authority
- Nottinghamshire County Council, a UK local authority

=== Elsewhere ===
- National Citizens' Coalition, Zambian political party
- Nelson City Council, a New Zealand local government body
- National Coordination Committee for Democratic Change, a Syrian political bloc
- National Council of Chiefs, a Zimbabwean assembly representing traditional leaders

== Military ==
- National Cadet Corps, Military Cadet Corps in various countries

== Religion ==
- National Christian Council (disambiguation), in various countries
- National Community Church, Washington DC, United States
- National Council of Churches, USA, or the National Council of the Churches of Christ in the USA
- New Creation Church, Singapore

== Other uses ==
- Nanocrystalline cellulose, a freeze-dried form of nanocellulose
- National Certified Counselor, a class of psychotherapist
- National Construction Code, publication of minimum requirements for buildings in Australia.
- National Coursing Club, national registration association for British Bred greyhounds
- Nederlandse Centrale Catalogus, the Central Catalog of the Netherlands National Library
- New Castle County, Delaware
- New Clark City
- Non-compete clause
- Normalized cross-correlation
- North Coast Corridor, an infrastructure project in San Diego County, California
- North Crimean Canal
- Northern Counties Committee, a former Northern Irish railway

== See also ==
- National Convention Center (disambiguation)
