= NCCS =

NCCS may refer to:

- National Cancer Centre Singapore, a Cancer specialist medical centre in Singapore
- National Catholic Community Service
- National Center for Charitable Statistics
- National Center for Computational Sciences, at Oak Ridge National Laboratory
- National Center for Constitutional Studies, American conservative organization
- National Centre For Cell Science, University of Pune, India
- National Coalition for Cancer Survivorship, American cancer survivor advocacy organization
- National Council of Churches of Singapore, a fellowship of churches and Christian organizations in Singapore
- New Canaan Country School, a K-9 school in New Canaan, Connecticut
- North Cow Creek School, K-8 public school in Palo Cedro, California
- National Center for Cyber Security (Pakistan)

== See also ==
- NCC (disambiguation)
