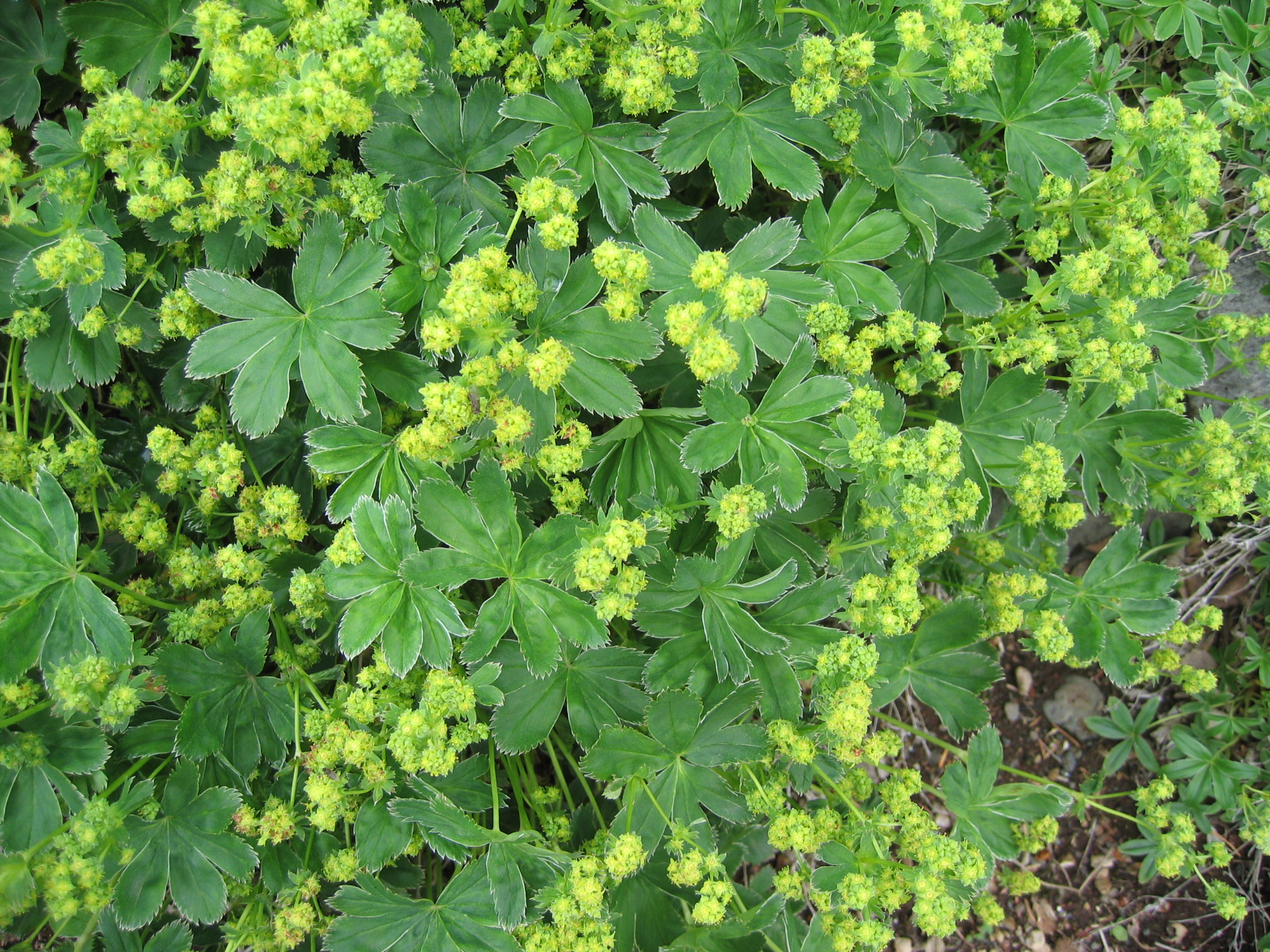

Scientific classification
- Kingdom: Plantae
- Clade: Tracheophytes
- Clade: Angiosperms
- Clade: Eudicots
- Clade: Rosids
- Order: Rosales
- Family: Rosaceae
- Genus: Alchemilla
- Species: A. faeroensis

Binomial name
- Alchemilla faeroensis (Lange) Buser

Synonyms
- List: Alchemilla argentea; Alchemilla fissa; Potentilla faeroensis

= Alchemilla faeroensis =

Plant species in the rose family

Alchemilla faeroensis, also known as Faroese lady's-mantle, is a species of arctic-montane herbaceous perennial plant native to the Faroe Islands and eastern Iceland. It is part of the lady's-mantle genus in the rose family. It has been described as "one of the outstanding endemics in northwestern Europe".

== Description ==
Faroese lady's-mantle is a small herbaceous plant growing to 15 centimeters (6 in) at most. In more exposed areas they are stunted, only growing to small sizes.

Its leaves each have seven lobes that are half to two-thirds to the base of the leaf. The edges of the lobes have coarse teeth. The top of its leaves are green and the undersides are silvery with hairs on the undersides. Its flowers are pale green and measure about 3 millimeters. It flowers in June and July.

== Taxonomy ==
Alchemilla faeroensis was scientifically described as a variety of Alchemilla fissa by Johan Martin Christian Lange in 1887. In 1894 Robert Buser raised it to species rank with its accepted name. It is classified in the Alchemilla genus within the family Rosaceae. The species is likely the result of a hybridization event between Alchemilla alpina and a subspecies of Alchemilla vulgaris, an idea that is supported by chromosome number counts and analysis of their phytochemicals. It has no accepted subspecies or varieties, but has seven synonyms.

Table of Synonyms
Name	Year	Rank	Notes
Alchemilla argentea Trevelyan	1837	species	= het.
Alchemilla faeroensis f. denudata Stefánsson	1901	form	= het.
Alchemilla faeroensis var. pumila Rostr.	1896	variety	= het.
Alchemilla fissa Hornem.	1835	species	= het.
Alchemilla fissa var. faeroensis Lange	1887	variety	≡ hom.
Alchemilla splendens subsp. faeroensis (Lange) Buser	1906	subspecies	≡ hom.
Potentilla faeroensis (Lange) Christenh. & Väre	2012	species	≡ hom.
Notes: ≡ homotypic synonym; = heterotypic synonym

=== Names ===
The species name, faeroensis, means "from the Faroe Islands" in Botanical Latin. Its common names include Faeroes lady's-mantle and Faeroeic lady's-mantle.

== Range and habitat ==
Faroese lady's-mantle grows on the Faroe Islands and the eastern half of Iceland. The furthest west in Iceland that they have been reported is in Ásbyrgi.

On the Faroe Islands it is more commonly found in higher areas, but can be found all the way to the edge of the sea. It is commonly found in crevices and rock-ledges in relatively dry areas and alongside streams elsewhere.
