= Alchemilla jamesonii =

Scientific classification
- Kingdom: Plantae
- Clade: Tracheophytes
- Clade: Angiosperms
- Clade: Eudicots
- Clade: Rosids
- Order: Rosales
- Family: Rosaceae
- Genus: Alchemilla
- Species: A. jamesonii

Binomial name
- Alchemilla jamesonii L.M.Perry

Synonyms
- Lachemilla jamesonii (L.M.Perry) Rothm.

Species of flowering plant

Alchemilla jamesonii, synonym Lachemilla jamesonii, is a species of plant in the family Rosaceae. It is native to Bolivia, Ecuador and Peru.

== Conservation ==
Under the synonym Lachemilla jamesonii, Alchemilla jamesonii was assessed as "vulnerable" in the 1998 IUCN Red List, where it is said to be native only to Ecuador. Plants of the World Online gives it a wider distribution.
