= Alchemilla aequatoriensis =

Conservation status
- Vulnerable (IUCN 3.1)

Scientific classification
- Kingdom: Plantae
- Clade: Tracheophytes
- Clade: Angiosperms
- Clade: Eudicots
- Clade: Rosids
- Order: Rosales
- Family: Rosaceae
- Genus: Alchemilla
- Species: A. aequatoriensis

Binomial name
- Alchemilla aequatoriensis Rothm.

Synonyms
- Lachemilla aequatoriensis (Rothm.) Rothm.

Species of flowering plant

Alchemilla aequatoriensis, synonym Lachemilla aequatoriensis, is a species of plant in the family Rosaceae. It is endemic to Ecuador.
