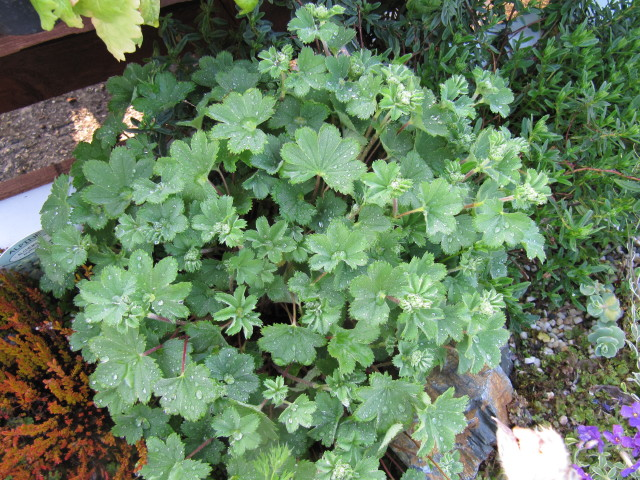

Scientific classification
- Kingdom: Plantae
- Clade: Tracheophytes
- Clade: Angiosperms
- Clade: Eudicots
- Clade: Rosids
- Order: Rosales
- Family: Rosaceae
- Genus: Alchemilla
- Species: A. erythropoda

Binomial name
- Alchemilla erythropoda Juz.

= Alchemilla erythropoda =

Species of flowering plant

Alchemilla erythropoda, the dwarf lady's mantle, is a species of flowering herbaceous perennial plant in the family Rosaceae, native to Eastern Europe. It forms a clump of hairy, palmate leaves up to 20 centimetres (7.9 in) high, with sprays of green-yellow flowers in early summer. The leaves of this and its relative A. mollis are noted for being highly water-repellent. It is smaller than A. mollis, however, and its leaves may develop a reddish tinge if grown in full sun.

This plant is valued as groundcover in cultivation in temperate regions. It tolerates a wide range of soil conditions, but is prone to self-seeding. It has gained the Royal Horticultural Society's Award of Garden Merit. It grows best in full sun to partial sun conditions, and is relatively pest- and disease-free. In the US, it's suitable for hardiness zones 3–8.

Because of the way water droplets collect on the leaves, medieval alchemists thought they possessed medicinal qualities, and they were used to treat women's ailments.
