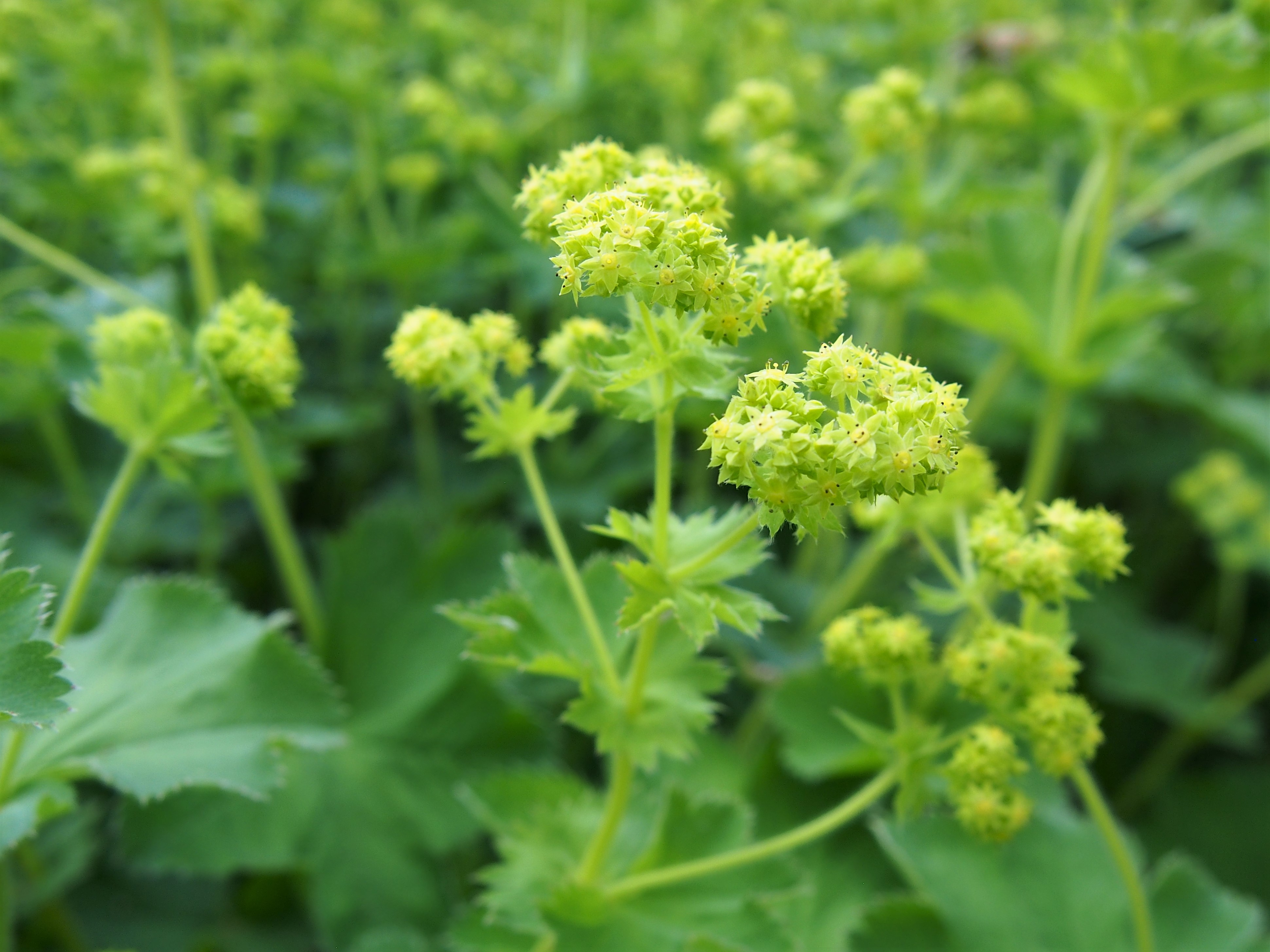

Scientific classification
- Kingdom: Plantae
- Clade: Tracheophytes
- Clade: Angiosperms
- Clade: Eudicots
- Clade: Rosids
- Order: Rosales
- Family: Rosaceae
- Genus: Alchemilla
- Species: A. plicata

Binomial name
- Alchemilla plicata Buser

= Alchemilla plicata =

Species of flowering plant

Alchemilla plicata is a species of flowering plant belonging to the family Rosaceae.

Its native range is Europe.
