= Alchemilla sprucei =

Scientific classification
- Kingdom: Plantae
- Clade: Tracheophytes
- Clade: Angiosperms
- Clade: Eudicots
- Clade: Rosids
- Order: Rosales
- Family: Rosaceae
- Genus: Alchemilla
- Species: A. sprucei

Binomial name
- Alchemilla sprucei L.M.Perry

Synonyms
- Lachemilla sprucei (L.M.Perry) Rothm.

Species of flowering plant

Alchemilla sprucei, synonym Lachemilla sprucei, is a species of plant in the family Rosaceae. It is native to south-west Colombia and Ecuador. It was first described in 1929 by Lily May Perry.

== Conservation ==
Under the synonym Lachemilla sprucei, Alchemilla sprucei was assessed as "vulnerable" in the 2004 IUCN Red List, where it is said to be native only to Ecuador. As of February 2023, Plants of the World Online also included Colombia in the distribution of A. sprucei .
