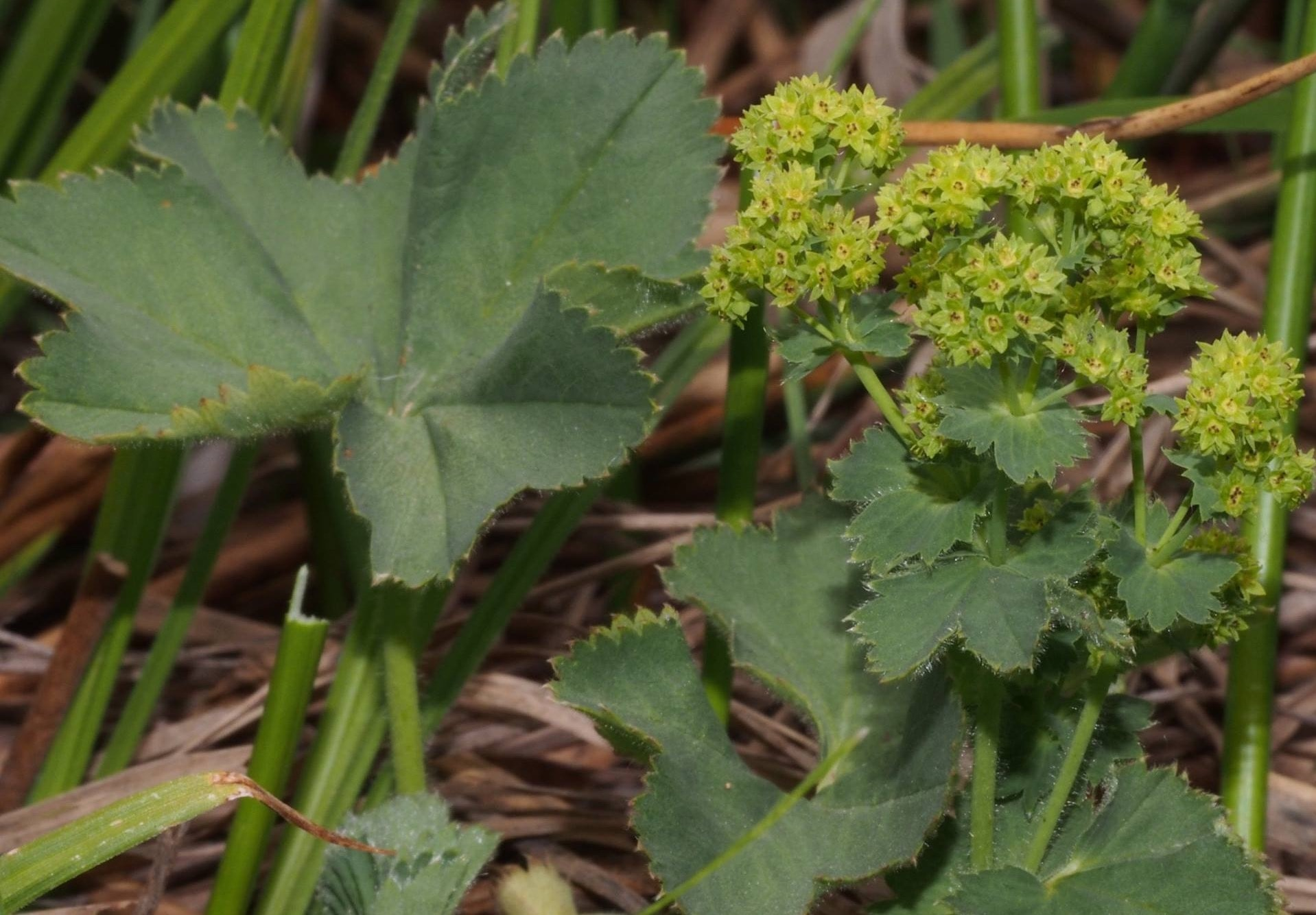
- In its natural habitat

Scientific classification
- Kingdom: Plantae
- Clade: Tracheophytes
- Clade: Angiosperms
- Clade: Eudicots
- Clade: Rosids
- Order: Rosales
- Family: Rosaceae
- Genus: Alchemilla
- Species: A. diademata

Binomial name
- Alchemilla diademata Rothm.

= Alchemilla diademata =

Species of plant

Alchemilla diademata, also known as the diadem lady's mantle (Arabic: كمالية مكللة), is a species of the genus Alchemilla endemic to Lebanon. The plant has been commonly used in folk medicine in Lebanon and its promising bioactive properties have been subject to a number of studies.

== Description ==
Alchemilla diademata has an erect 10 to 15 cm (3.9 to 5.9 in) high stem. The stem is highly pubescent at the base, and the trichomes become less dense at the tips. The leaves are basal and measure 3 to 4 cm (1.2 to 1.6 in) wide and 2 to 3 cm (0.79 to 1.18 in) wide; they resemble lobed kidneys with an oval with an inward curve on one side The leaves are incised to the third into 7 to 9 lobes, each of them fringed by 6 to 7 teeth on each side of the lobes. The teeth end with bristles and are slightly connivent. The leaf underside is hispid and its sinus is cordate. The plant has long, membranous and brownish stipules; it has a yellow-green pedicellated and glabrous inflorescence. The ovoid flowers appear from May to July, and they produce ovoid and urn-shaped fruits.

== Distribution and habitat ==
The plant is only found on the slopes of Mount Sannine in the Mount Lebanon range; it favors humid sandstone.

== Research and uses ==
=== Medicine ===
A 2004 screening of Lebanese indigenous plants that have historically been used in folk-medicine conducted in the American University of Beirut Nature Conservation Center laboratories showed that A. diademata extract had an antimicrobial activity against Staphylococcus aureus. Later studies showed that the plant also has anti-fungal activity against Candida albicans.

=== Biological pest control ===
A 2014 study investigating the biological activity of Lebanese indigenous medicinal plants showed that whole plant extracts of A. diademata has a significant repellent effect against the adult silverleaf whitefly, an important invasive agricultural pest.
