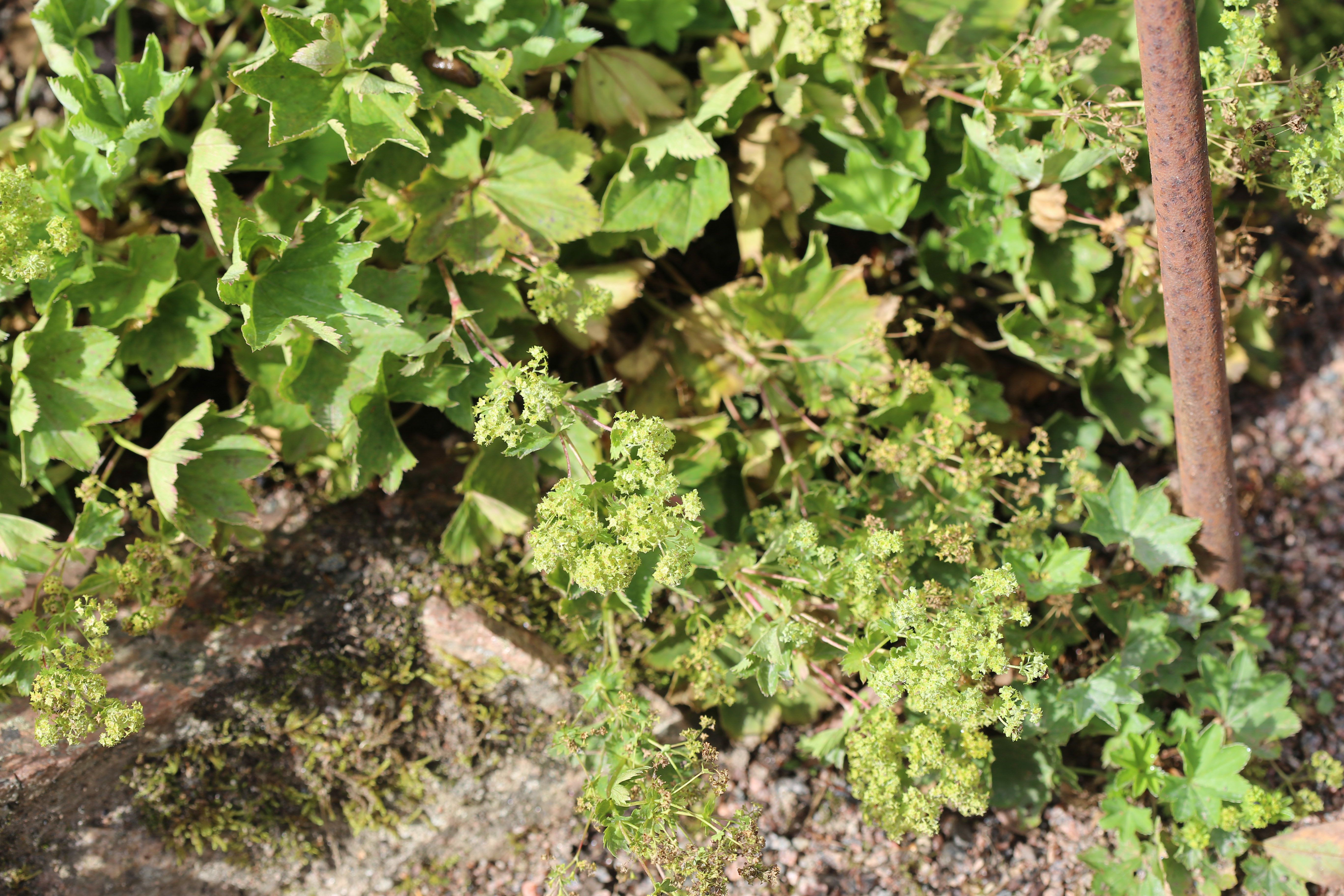

Scientific classification
- Kingdom: Plantae
- Clade: Tracheophytes
- Clade: Angiosperms
- Clade: Eudicots
- Clade: Rosids
- Order: Rosales
- Family: Rosaceae
- Genus: Alchemilla
- Species: A. murbeckiana

Binomial name
- Alchemilla murbeckiana Buser

= Alchemilla murbeckiana =

Species of flowering plant

Alchemilla murbeckiana is a species of flowering plant belonging to the family Rosaceae.

Its native range is Northern and Eastern Europe to Mongolia, Kamchatka.
