= Alchemilla propinqua =

Scientific classification
- Kingdom: Plantae
- Clade: Tracheophytes
- Clade: Angiosperms
- Clade: Eudicots
- Clade: Rosids
- Order: Rosales
- Family: Rosaceae
- Genus: Alchemilla
- Species: A. propinqua

Binomial name
- Alchemilla propinqua H.Lindb. ex Juz.

Species of flowering plant

Alchemilla propinqua is a species of flowering plant belonging to the family Rosaceae.

Its native range is Central and Eastern Europe.
