= Alchemilla heptagona =

Scientific classification
- Kingdom: Plantae
- Clade: Tracheophytes
- Clade: Angiosperms
- Clade: Eudicots
- Clade: Rosids
- Order: Rosales
- Family: Rosaceae
- Genus: Alchemilla
- Species: A. heptagona

Binomial name
- Alchemilla heptagona Juz.

Species of flowering plant

Alchemilla heptagona is a species of plants belonging to the family Rosaceae.

It is native to Europe.
