= Alchemilla hungarica =

Scientific classification
- Kingdom: Plantae
- Clade: Tracheophytes
- Clade: Angiosperms
- Clade: Eudicots
- Clade: Rosids
- Order: Rosales
- Family: Rosaceae
- Genus: Alchemilla
- Species: A. hungarica

Binomial name
- Alchemilla hungarica Soó

Species of flowering plant

Alchemilla hungarica is a plant species of the genus Alchemilla, belonging to the family Rosaceae.
