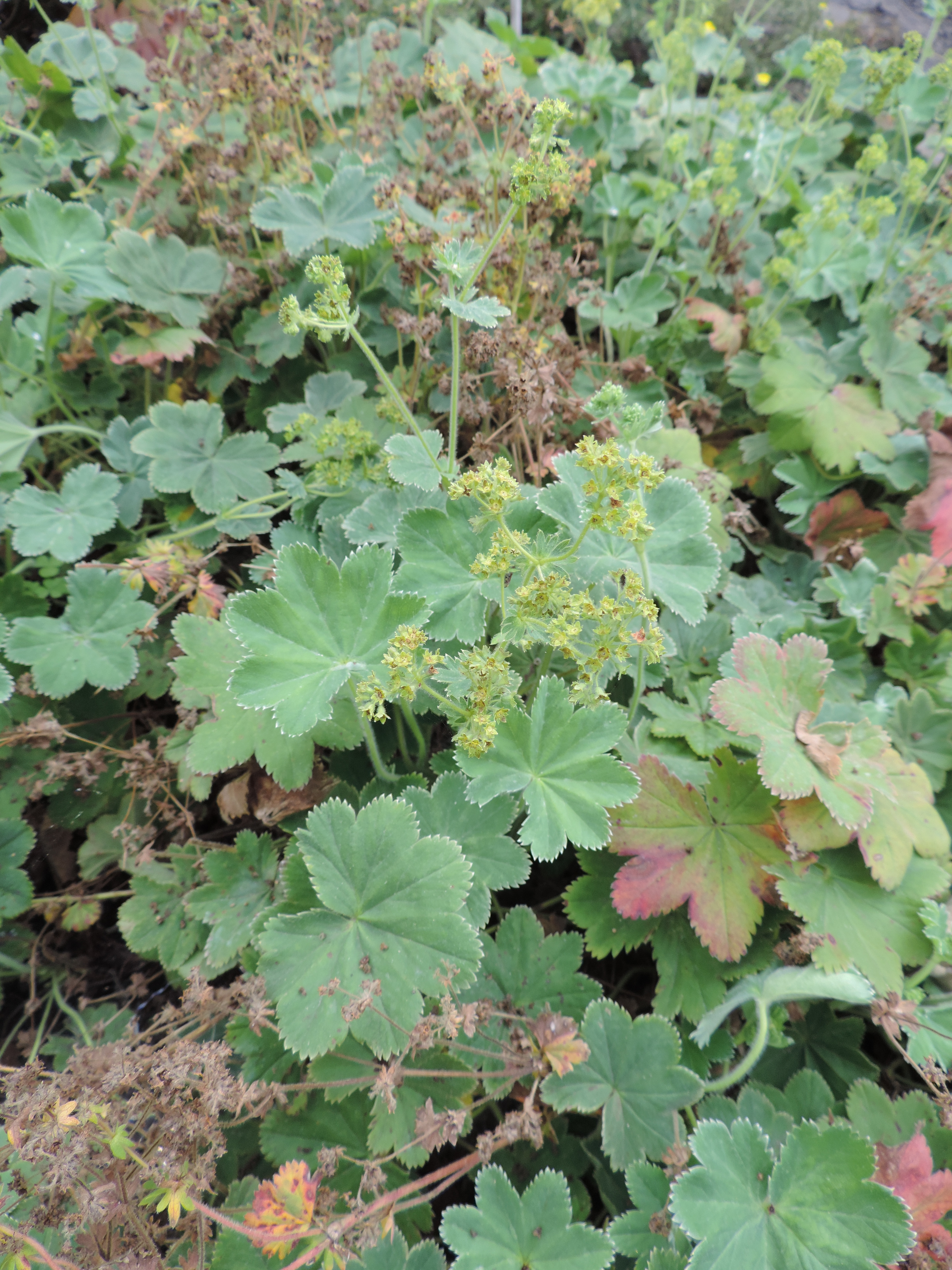

Scientific classification
- Kingdom: Plantae
- Clade: Tracheophytes
- Clade: Angiosperms
- Clade: Eudicots
- Clade: Rosids
- Order: Rosales
- Family: Rosaceae
- Genus: Alchemilla
- Species: A. hirsuticaulis

Binomial name
- Alchemilla hirsuticaulis H.Lindb., 1904

= Alchemilla hirsuticaulis =

Species of flowering plant

Alchemilla hirsuticaulis is a species of plants belonging to the family Rosaceae.

It is native to Northern Europe, Eastern Europe, and to Western Siberia.
