= Alchemilla rupestris =

Conservation status
- Vulnerable (IUCN 3.1)

Scientific classification
- Kingdom: Plantae
- Clade: Tracheophytes
- Clade: Angiosperms
- Clade: Eudicots
- Clade: Rosids
- Order: Rosales
- Family: Rosaceae
- Genus: Alchemilla
- Species: A. rupestris

Binomial name
- Alchemilla rupestris Kunth

Synonyms
- Lachemilla rupestris (Kunth) Rothm.; Alchemilla diandra Willd. ex Steud., not validly published

Species of flowering plant

Alchemilla rupestris, synonym Lachemilla rupestris, is a species of plant in the family Rosaceae. It is endemic to Ecuador. Alchemilla rupestris has lateral segments of leaves with yellow-brown membranaceous basal stipules on it. The flowers have 2-4 carpels that are 2.5-3 mm long.
