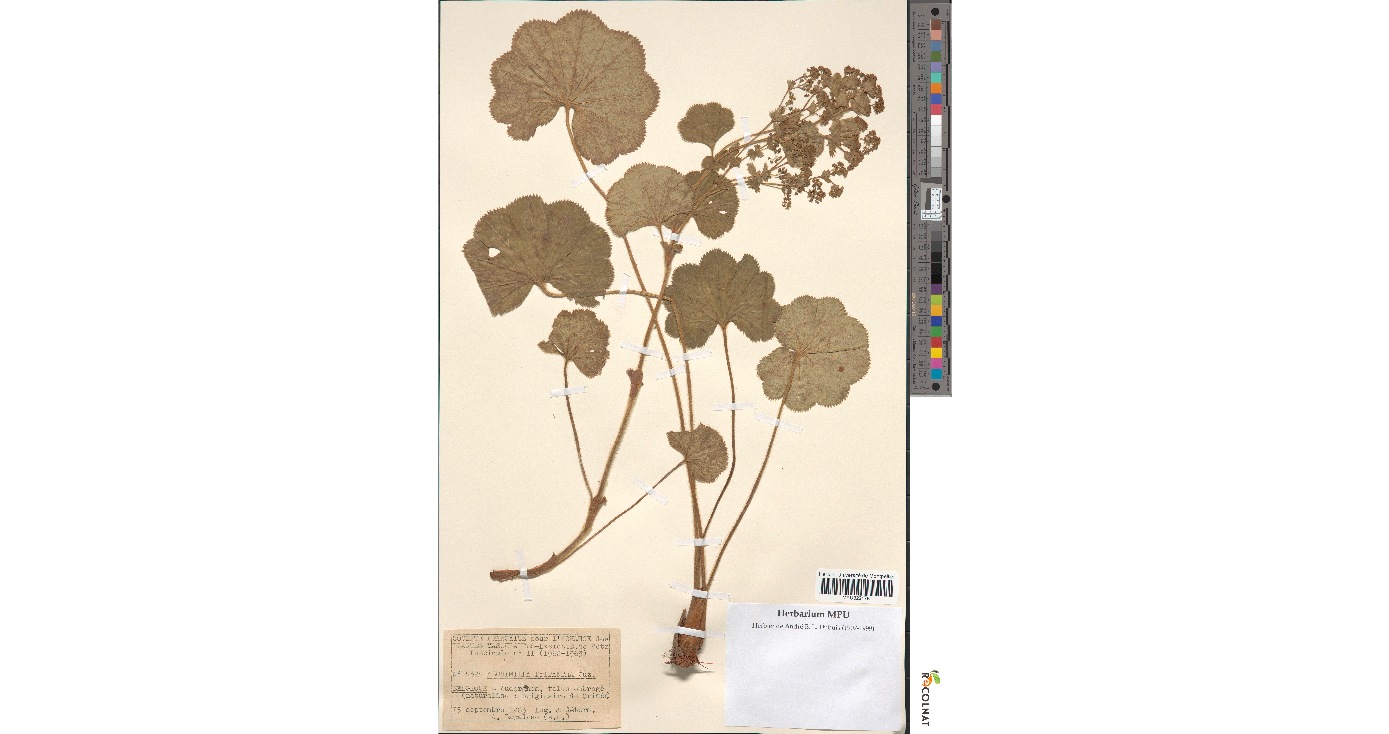

Scientific classification
- Kingdom: Plantae
- Clade: Tracheophytes
- Clade: Angiosperms
- Clade: Eudicots
- Clade: Rosids
- Order: Rosales
- Family: Rosaceae
- Genus: Alchemilla
- Species: A. tytthantha

Binomial name
- Alchemilla tytthantha Juz.

Synonyms
- Alchemilla lepantha; Alchemilla multiflora

= Alchemilla tytthantha =

Species of lady's mantle

Alchemilla tytthantha, the Crimean lady's mantle, is a species of lady's mantle found in Europe. It is originally native to Crimea, but has been introduced to the Czech Republic, Slovakia, Belgium, and Great Britain. It was first reported in Britain (at Selkirk) in 1956 and has been treated as a weed in Britain since.

The plant has relatively small flowers and is only slightly hairy.
