= Alchemilla stricta =

Conservation status
- Least Concern (IUCN 3.1)

Scientific classification
- Kingdom: Plantae
- Clade: Tracheophytes
- Clade: Angiosperms
- Clade: Eudicots
- Clade: Rosids
- Order: Rosales
- Family: Rosaceae
- Genus: Alchemilla
- Species: A. stricta

Binomial name
- Alchemilla stricta Rothm.

Species of flowering plant

Alchemilla stricta is a species of lady's mantle that is endemic to Turkey. It is only known from five locations; around Kağızman, Lake Abant, Sarıkamış, Karagöl-Sahara and the Efeler forest. It is found in marshy ground by lakes or streams.
