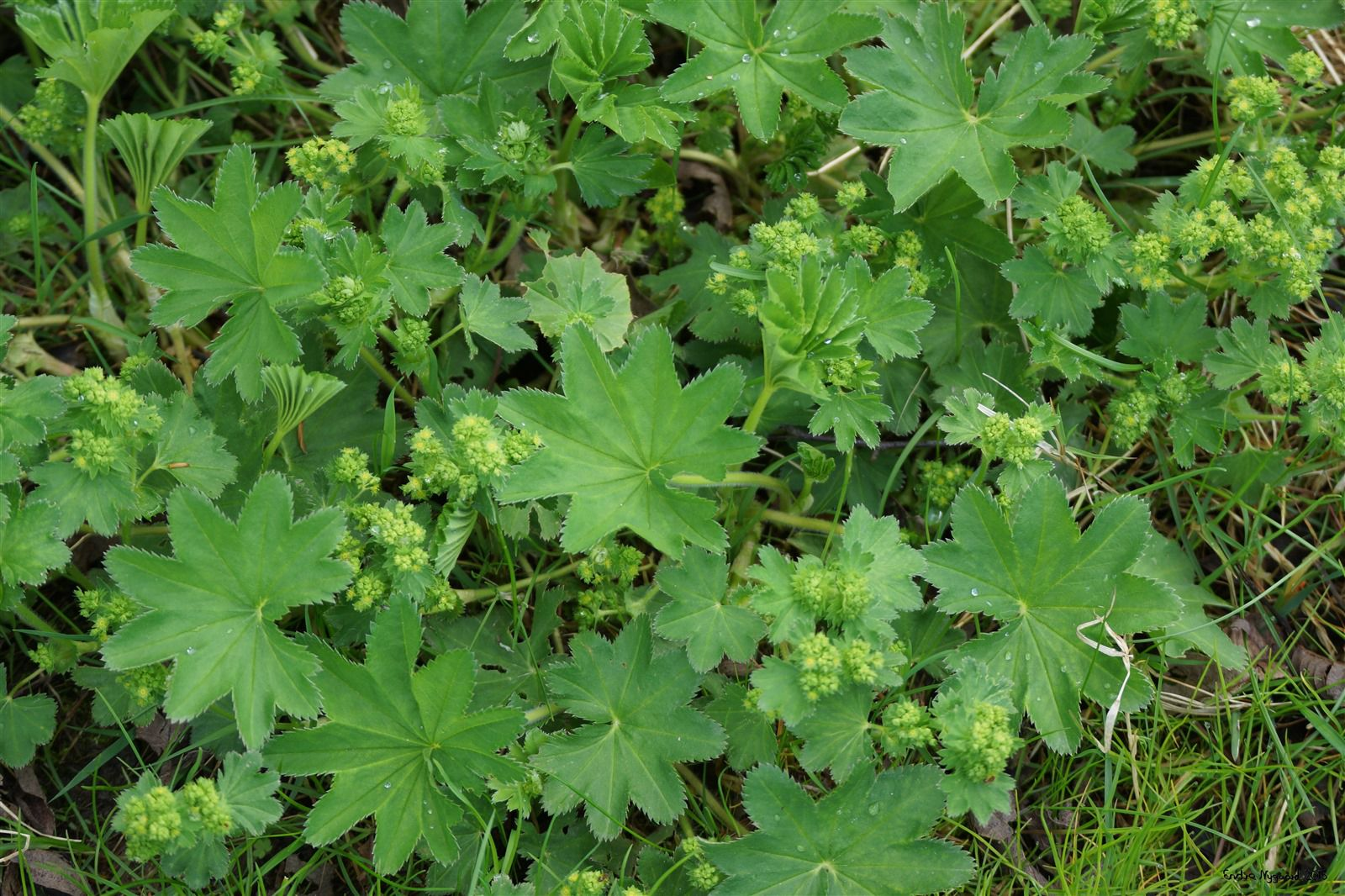

Scientific classification
- Kingdom: Plantae
- Clade: Tracheophytes
- Clade: Angiosperms
- Clade: Eudicots
- Clade: Rosids
- Order: Rosales
- Family: Rosaceae
- Genus: Alchemilla
- Species: A. subcrenata

Binomial name
- Alchemilla subcrenata Buser

= Alchemilla subcrenata =

Species of flowering plant

Alchemilla subcrenata is a species of flowering plant belonging to the family Rosaceae.

Its native range is Europe to Kamchatka.
