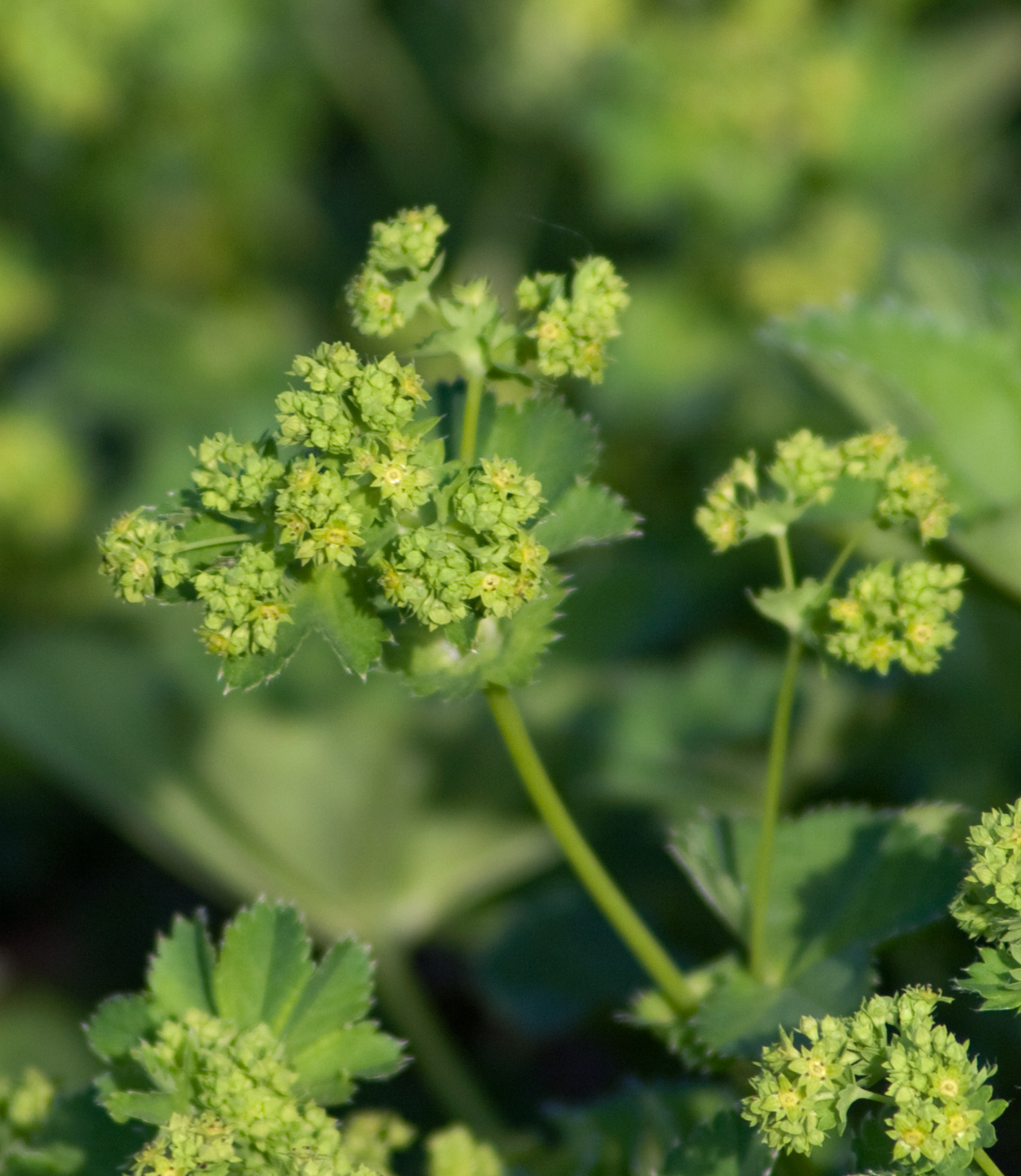

Scientific classification
- Kingdom: Plantae
- Clade: Tracheophytes
- Clade: Angiosperms
- Clade: Eudicots
- Clade: Rosids
- Order: Rosales
- Family: Rosaceae
- Genus: Alchemilla
- Species: A. monticola

Binomial name
- Alchemilla monticola Opiz, 1838

= Alchemilla monticola =

Species of flowering plant

Alchemilla monticola, also called hairy lady's mantle, is a species of plant belonging to the family Rosaceae.

It is native range extends from Europe to Siberia and Central China.
