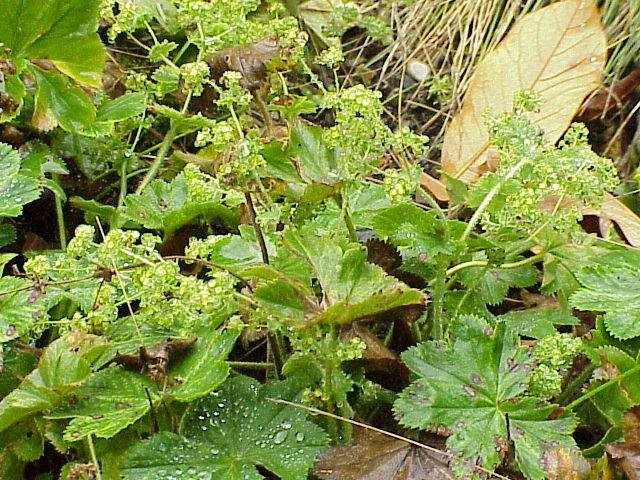
- Habit

Scientific classification
- Kingdom: Plantae
- Clade: Tracheophytes
- Clade: Angiosperms
- Clade: Eudicots
- Clade: Rosids
- Order: Rosales
- Family: Rosaceae
- Genus: Alchemilla
- Species: A. flabellata

Binomial name
- Alchemilla flabellata Buser

Synonyms
- Alchemilla ambigens Jord. ex Nyman

= Alchemilla flabellata =

Species of flowering plant

Alchemilla flabellata, the fan lady's mantle, is a species of flowering plant in the family Rosaceae. It is native to central and southern Europe, Ukraine, and possibly central European Russia, and is locally extinct in Czechoslovakia. It prefers to grow in mountainous areas in calcareous meadows.
