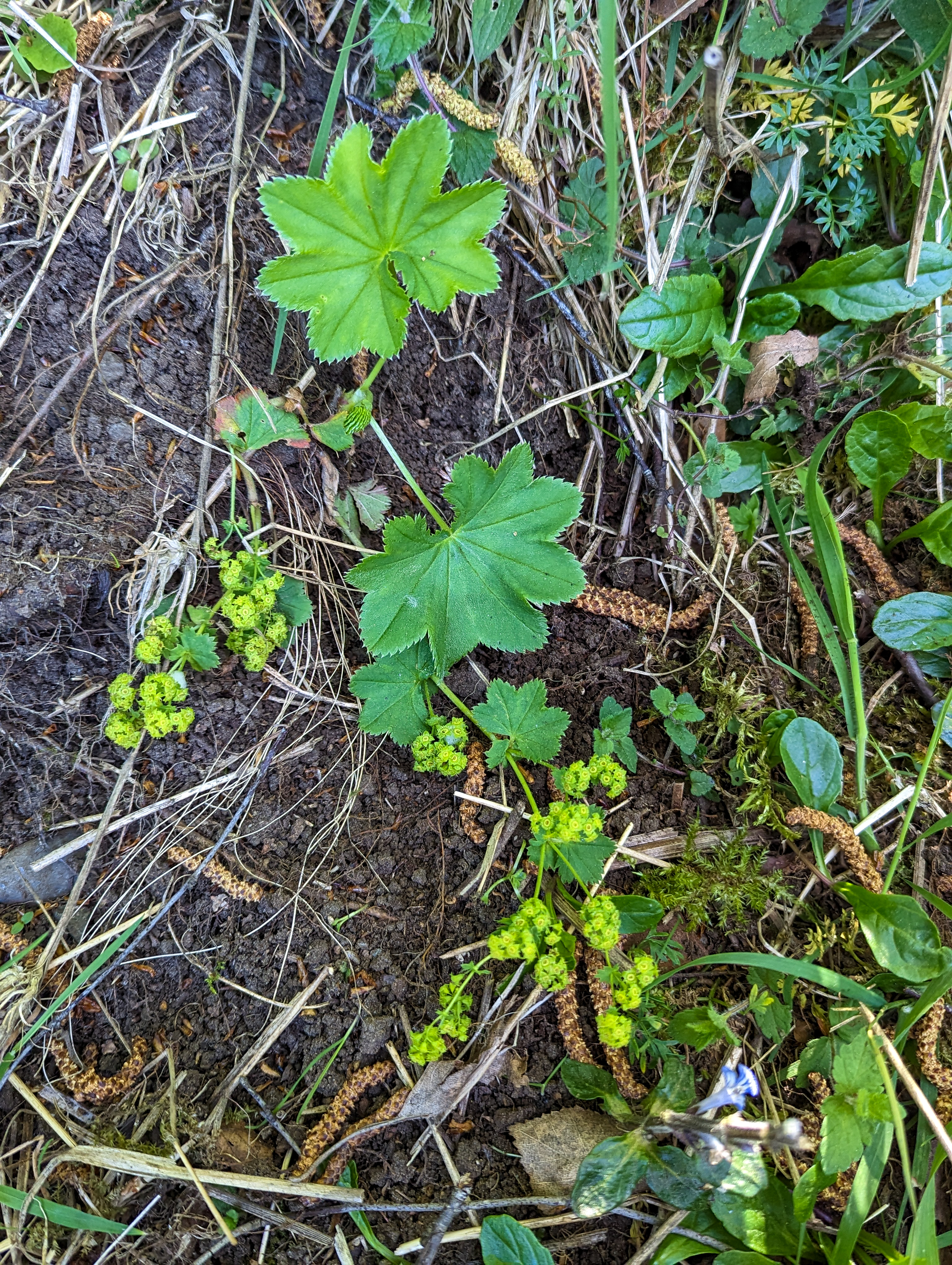

Scientific classification
- Kingdom: Plantae
- Clade: Tracheophytes
- Clade: Angiosperms
- Clade: Eudicots
- Clade: Rosids
- Order: Rosales
- Family: Rosaceae
- Genus: Alchemilla
- Species: A. glomerulans

Binomial name
- Alchemilla glomerulans Robert Buser, 1893

= Alchemilla glomerulans =

Species of flowering plant

Alchemilla glomerulans is a species of plant belonging to the family Rosaceae.

It is native to the subarctic and montane parts of Europe, Western Siberia and Northern America.

== Description ==
Alchemilla glomerulans is a low-growing herb forming loosely connected mats, the plants being linked by thick, irregularly-branched rhizomes clad with the blackish-remnants of dead stalks and leaves. The aerial shoots have small rosettes formed of 2 to 4 long-stalked basal leaves. The leaves are nearly circular in outline, slightly pleated, with about 9 deeply-indented and palmately-arranged, rounded lobes. The petioles, the veins and the lower surface of the leaf blades bear appressed hairs, and the margins are finely toothed. Sprawling reproductive stems arise from the caudex and bear 2 to 4 smaller leaves with short stalks. The inflorescence consists of a composite cyme with clusters of up to 30 tiny, yellowish-green flowers on short stalks. The individual flowers grow from an urn-shaped hypanthium. They are symmetric and have 4 hypercalyx lobes, 4 sepals, no petals, 4 stamens and a single carpel. The fruit is a nut enclosed in the hypanthium.

== Distribution ==
Alchemilla glomerulans is native to Quebec, Labrador, Greenland, Iceland, Great Britain, France, Spain, Germany, Italy, Switzerland, Albania, Austria, Yugoslavia, Finland, Norway, Sweden, the Baltic States, Northern European Russia and West Siberia. It grows predominantly in the subarctic and subalpine biomes.

== Ecology ==
The plant is found growing on tundra, alpine meadows and in snow hollows. It often spreads by vegetative means with the rhizome fracturing. In Svalbard, for example, the plant seldom flowers but forms large clonal colonies and is known from two widely-separated locations. Seed development is assisted by pseudogamy. The distribution of seed is probably by wind and possibly animals.
