= Alchemilla jaroschenkoi =

Holotrichous lady's mantle

Conservation status
- Near Threatened (IUCN 3.1)

Scientific classification
- Kingdom: Plantae
- Clade: Tracheophytes
- Clade: Angiosperms
- Clade: Eudicots
- Clade: Rosids
- Order: Rosales
- Family: Rosaceae
- Genus: Alchemilla
- Species: A. jaroschenkoi

Binomial name
- Alchemilla jaroschenkoi Grossh.

Species of flowering plant

Alchemilla jaroschenkoi, the holotrichous lady's mantle, is a species of lady's mantle that is endemic to Azerbaijan, where it is only known from near Kiçik Cheurly. It is found in alpine meadows and pastures.
