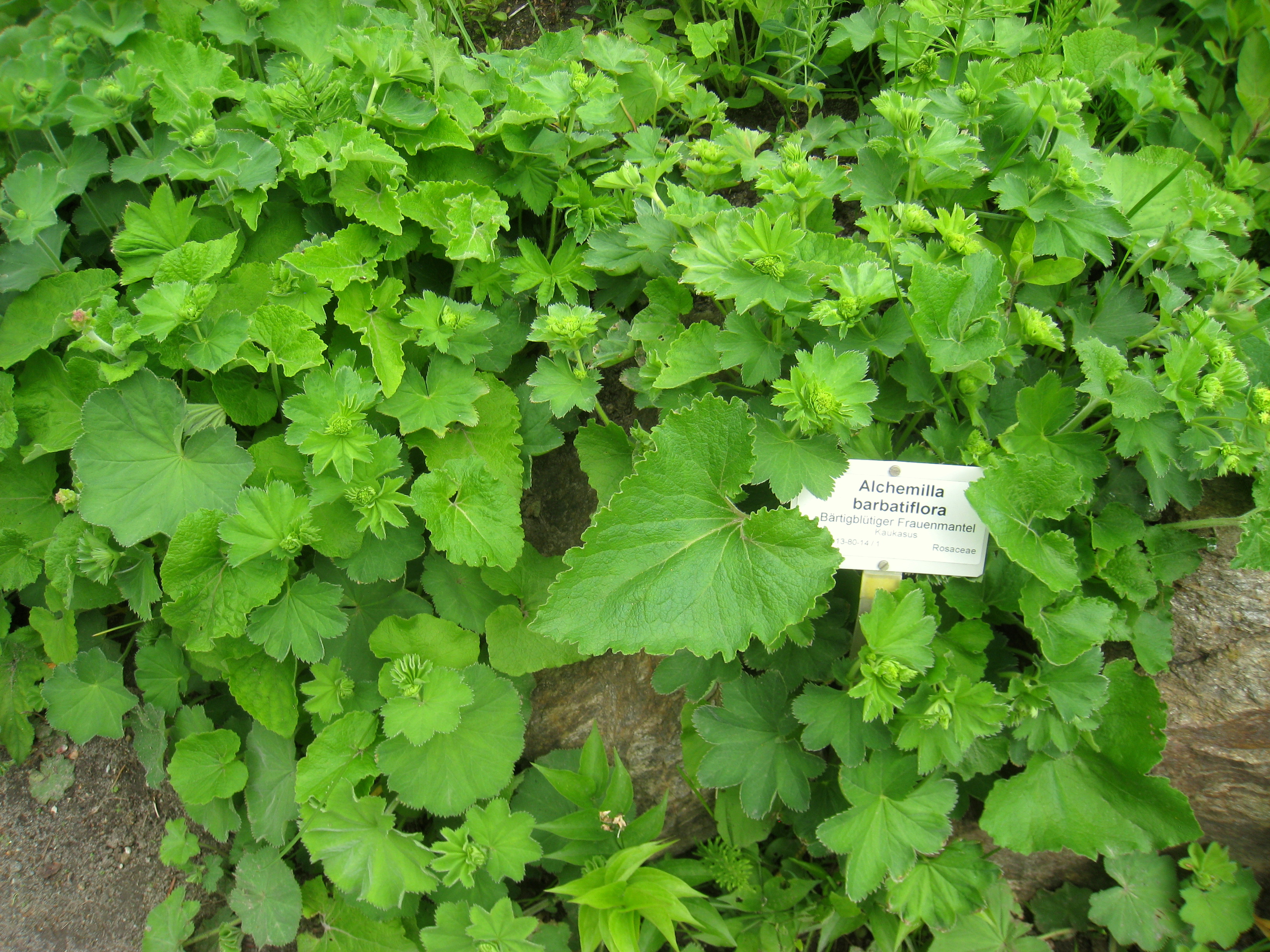

Scientific classification
- Kingdom: Plantae
- Clade: Tracheophytes
- Clade: Angiosperms
- Clade: Eudicots
- Clade: Rosids
- Order: Rosales
- Family: Rosaceae
- Genus: Alchemilla
- Species: A. barbatiflora

Binomial name
- Alchemilla barbatiflora S.V.Juzepczuk

= Alchemilla barbatiflora =

Species of flowering plant

Alchemilla barbatiflora is an herbaceous perennial plant native to the Caucasus.
