= Alchemilla bursensis =

Conservation status
- Near Threatened (IUCN 3.1)

Scientific classification
- Kingdom: Plantae
- Clade: Tracheophytes
- Clade: Angiosperms
- Clade: Eudicots
- Clade: Rosids
- Order: Rosales
- Family: Rosaceae
- Genus: Alchemilla
- Species: A. bursensis

Binomial name
- Alchemilla bursensis Pawł.

Species of flowering plant

Alchemilla bursensis is a species of lady's mantle that is endemic to two sites in northwestern Turkey; the Tahtaköprü forest and near Sincanlı. It inhabits streamsides and banks under beech forests. It is likely to be threatened by climate change and forestry.
