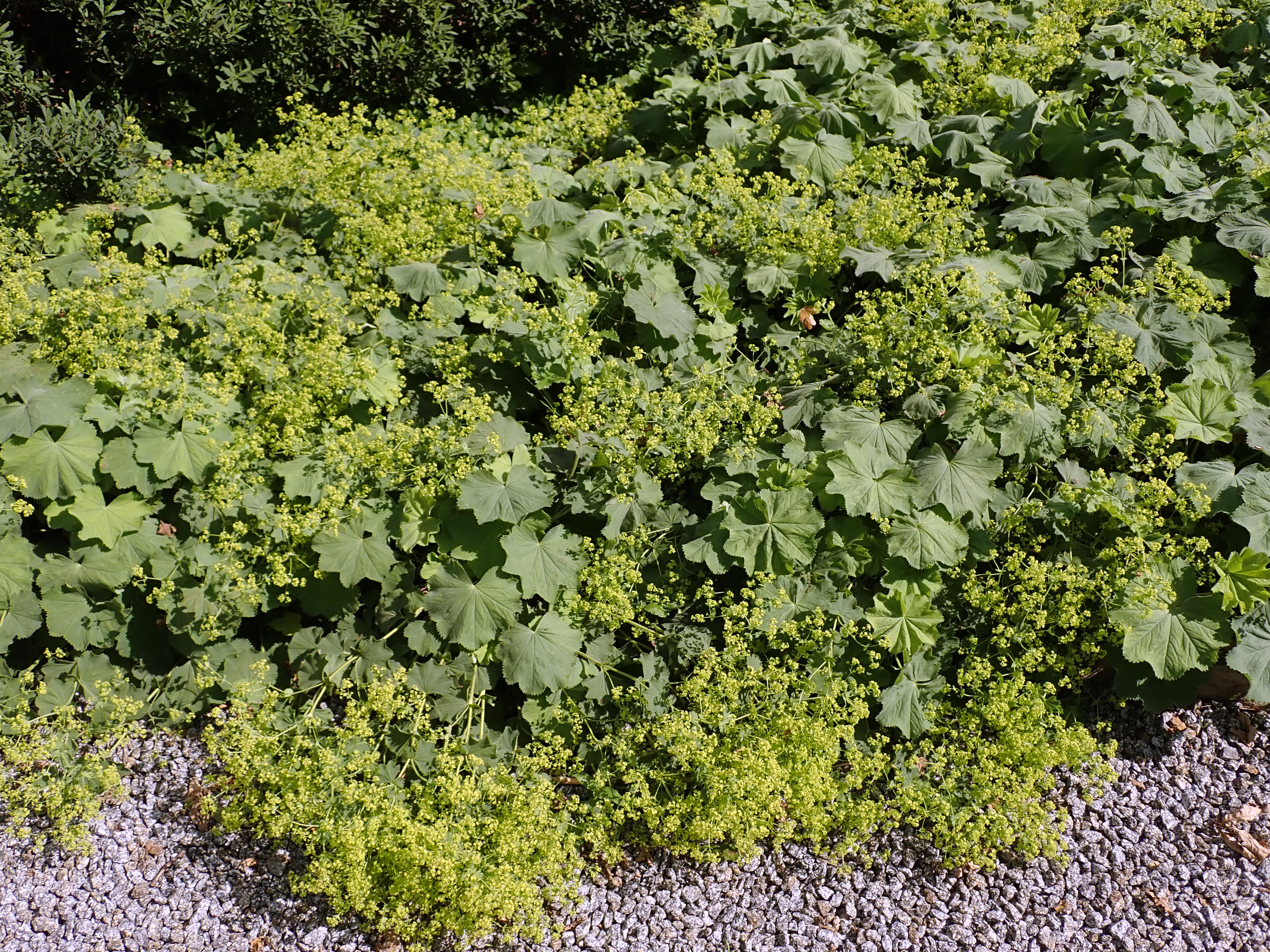

Scientific classification
- Kingdom: Plantae
- Clade: Tracheophytes
- Clade: Angiosperms
- Clade: Eudicots
- Clade: Rosids
- Order: Rosales
- Family: Rosaceae
- Genus: Alchemilla
- Species: A. xanthochlora

Binomial name
- Alchemilla xanthochlora Werner Rothmaler

Synonyms
- Alchemilla pratensis (F.W.Schmidt) Opiz; Potentilla xanthochlora (Rothm.) Christenh. & Väre

= Alchemilla xanthochlora =

Species of flowering plant

Alchemilla xanthochlora is a species of flowering plant belonging to the family Rosaceae.

== Description ==
A herbaceous perennial, with the habit often forming a mat-like layer of leaves on the ground.

Stems are erect to ascending, flowering stems growing up to 15-50 cm tall.

Leaves palmately 9-11 lobed but not separated into leaflets, petiole 8-15 cm long. The adaxial side is glabrous or with very little hair, while the abaxial side (just like stems and leaf petioles) has dense to erect trichomes. Leaf margins are toothed.^{423}

Flowers typically 2.5 mm in diameter, greenish or yellowish, with the formed inflorescence being typically glabrous and resembling a cymose cluster. Sepals are 1 mm long, longer than the epicalyx. Flowers usually contain 4 stamens.

Fruits are achenes, each 1.5 mm long.

== Distribution ==
It is native to Europe and Northern America. Introduced into Finland, Northwest European Russia, Eastern Australia (New South Wales and Victoria) and Eastern Canada.
