= National Convention Center =

National Convention Center or National Convention Centre may refer to:

- Jinnah Convention Centre, Pakistan
- China National Convention Center, Beijing
- National Convention Centre Canberra, Australia
- Gaylord National Convention Center
- Queen Sirikit National Convention Center
- Vietnam National Convention Center
- Convention Centre Dublin
