= Alchemilla angustata =

Scientific classification
- Kingdom: Plantae
- Clade: Tracheophytes
- Clade: Angiosperms
- Clade: Eudicots
- Clade: Rosids
- Order: Rosales
- Family: Rosaceae
- Genus: Alchemilla
- Species: A. angustata

Binomial name
- Alchemilla angustata S.E.Fröhner

Species of plant

Alchemilla angustata is a species of flowering plant in the family Rosaceae, native to the Pyrenees. It was first described by Sigurd Erich Fröhner in 1998.
