= AUB Nature Conservation Center =

Coordinates: 33°53′59.87″N 35°28′56.22″E

AUB Nature Conversation Center
- Founded: 2002
- Founder: AUB faculty members
- Location: Beirut, Lebanon
- Method: Tree planting, Seed Collection, Concerts, Youth Activities

AUB – Nature Conservation Center (NCC) formerly known as IBSAR, is an academic research center, founded in 2002, under the office of the Provost at the American University of Beirut (AUB), Lebanon. It is a platform for multidisciplinary projects that promote nature conservation. The center's members consist of faculty from different disciplines.

== Programs ==
NCC is a member of the Convention on Biological Diversity (CBD) and the Green Map Organization. Every year, the Center celebrates the International Biodiversity Day At AUB (IBDAA) with all the AUB community. It organizes the yearly "Biodiversity Village Award" (BVA) and offers participating municipalities different awards for the best green practices. Tree planting is one of the activities the center leads under its "Ana Shajara" program, which has greened Lebanon with more than 82,000 trees since 2004. As part of its research activities, the NCC has been studying medicinal properties of molecules extracted from marine and terrestrial species.
