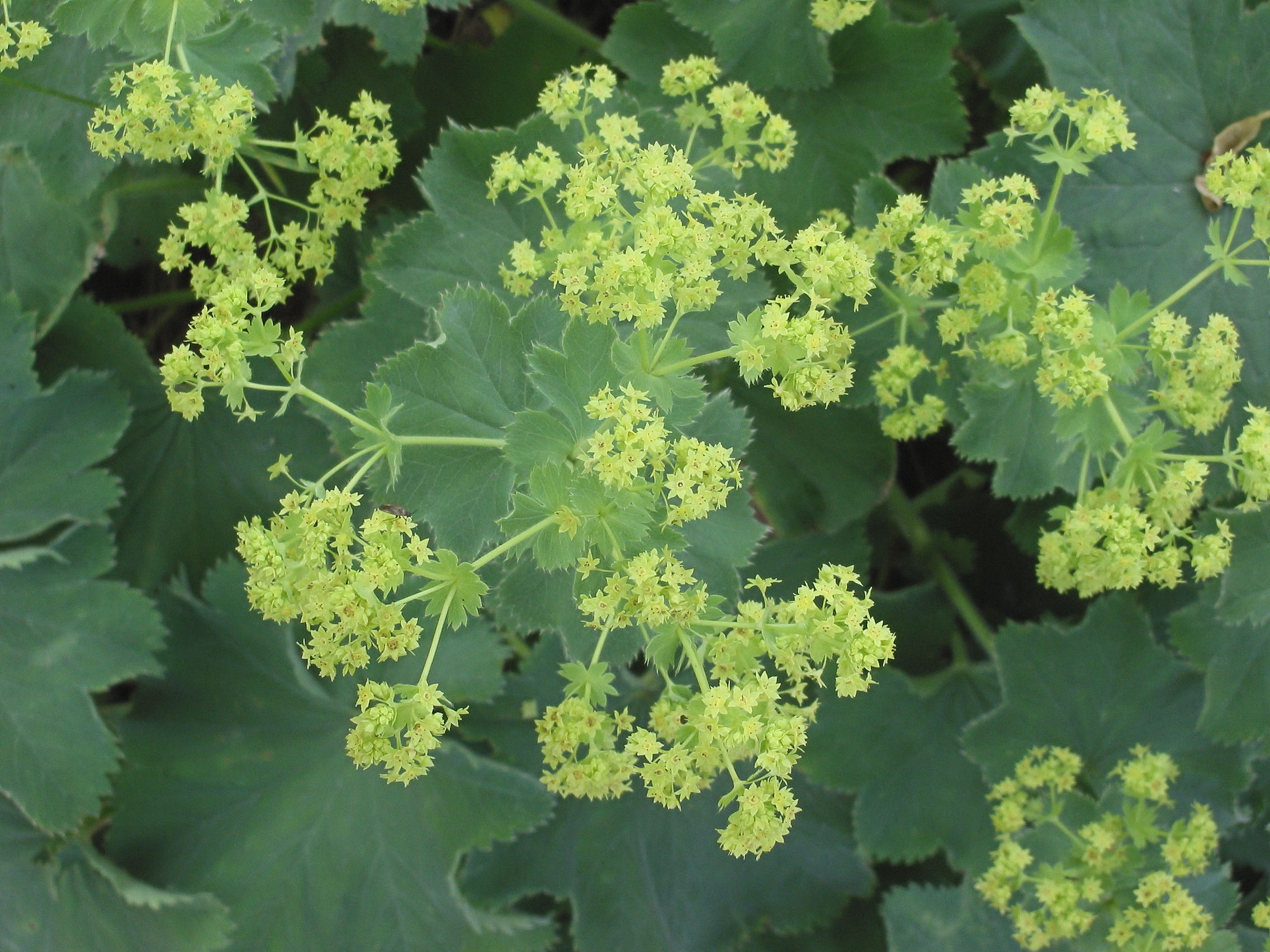
- Flowering plant

Conservation status
- Data Deficient (IUCN 3.1)

Scientific classification
- Kingdom: Plantae
- Clade: Tracheophytes
- Clade: Angiosperms
- Clade: Eudicots
- Clade: Rosids
- Order: Rosales
- Family: Rosaceae
- Genus: Alchemilla
- Species: A. mollis

Binomial name
- Alchemilla mollis (Buser) Rothm.

= Alchemilla mollis =

Species of flowering plant

Alchemilla mollis, the garden lady's-mantle or lady's-mantle, is a species of flowering plant in the family Rosaceae. This herbaceous perennial plant is native to Southern Europe and grown throughout the world as an ornamental garden plant. It grows 30 to 45 cm (12 to 18 in) tall, with leaves that are palmately veined, with a scalloped and serrated margin. The stipules are noteworthy in that they are fused together and leaf like. The chartreuse yellow flowers are held in dense clusters above the foliage. A. mollis has gained the Royal Horticultural Society's Award of Garden Merit. The plant self-seeds freely and can become invasive.

According to some accounts, lady's mantle has been used for centuries as a herbal remedy. According to other authorities, however, it has never been used medicinally, but has been confused with two species that have a history of medicinal use: A. alpina (Alpine lady's mantle) and A. xanthochlora.

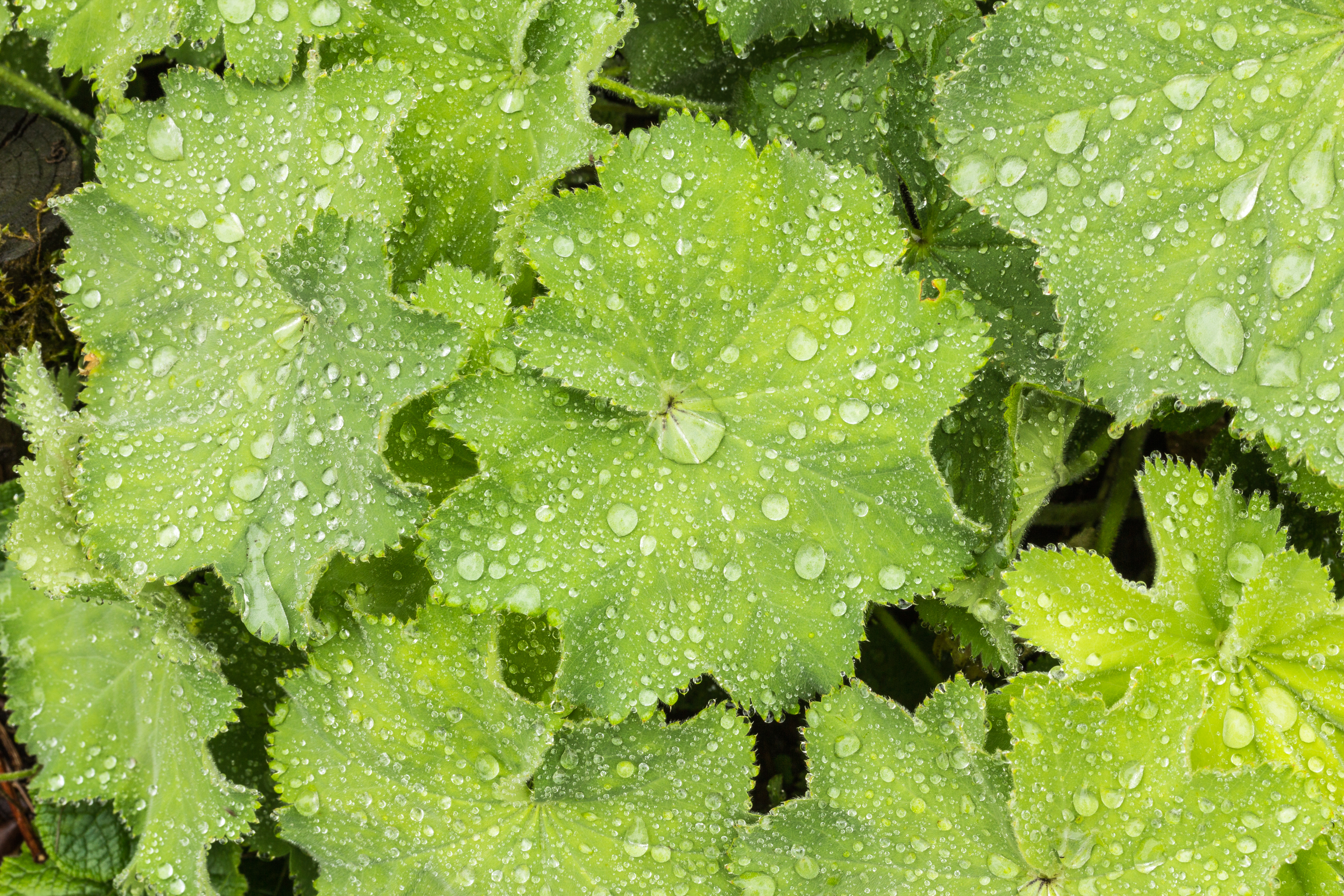
Showing the beading effect of water on its leaves due to hydrophobicity

The plant is often grown as groundcover, and is valued for the appearance of its leaves in wet weather. Water beads on the leaves due to their dewetting properties. These beads of water were considered by alchemists to be the purest form of water. They used this water in their quest to turn base metal into gold, hence the name Alchemilla. The Latin specific epithet mollis means "soft", referring to the hairs on the leaves.

Lady's mantle is an invasive species in the Faroe Islands, where local authorities have encouraged the public to uproot the plant if they find it.
