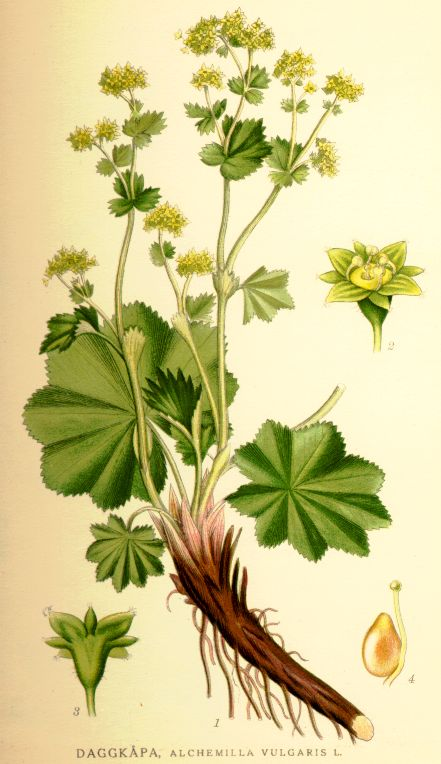

Scientific classification
- Kingdom: Plantae
- Clade: Tracheophytes
- Clade: Angiosperms
- Clade: Eudicots
- Clade: Rosids
- Order: Rosales
- Family: Rosaceae
- Genus: Alchemilla
- Species: A. vulgaris

Binomial name
- Alchemilla vulgaris L.

= Alchemilla vulgaris =

Lady's mantle

Species of flowering plant

Alchemilla vulgaris, commonly known as padelion and lady's mantle, is a herbaceous perennial plant, native to Europe and introduced to the US. These perennial wildflowers, members of the family Rosaceae, are sometimes grown in gardens - mainly for their aerial parts, as they can be harvested and used in the making of herbal infusions.

Lady's mantle is commonly seen in unimproved or lightly fertilized grassland, on roadside verges and banks, in chalk downland and on mountain slopes.

Synonyms:

- Alchemilla acutangula Buser
- Alchemilla acutiloba Opiz
- Alchemilla latifolia Salisb.
- Alchemilla pontica (Buser) K.Malý
- Potentilla acutiloba (Opiz) Christenh. & Väre
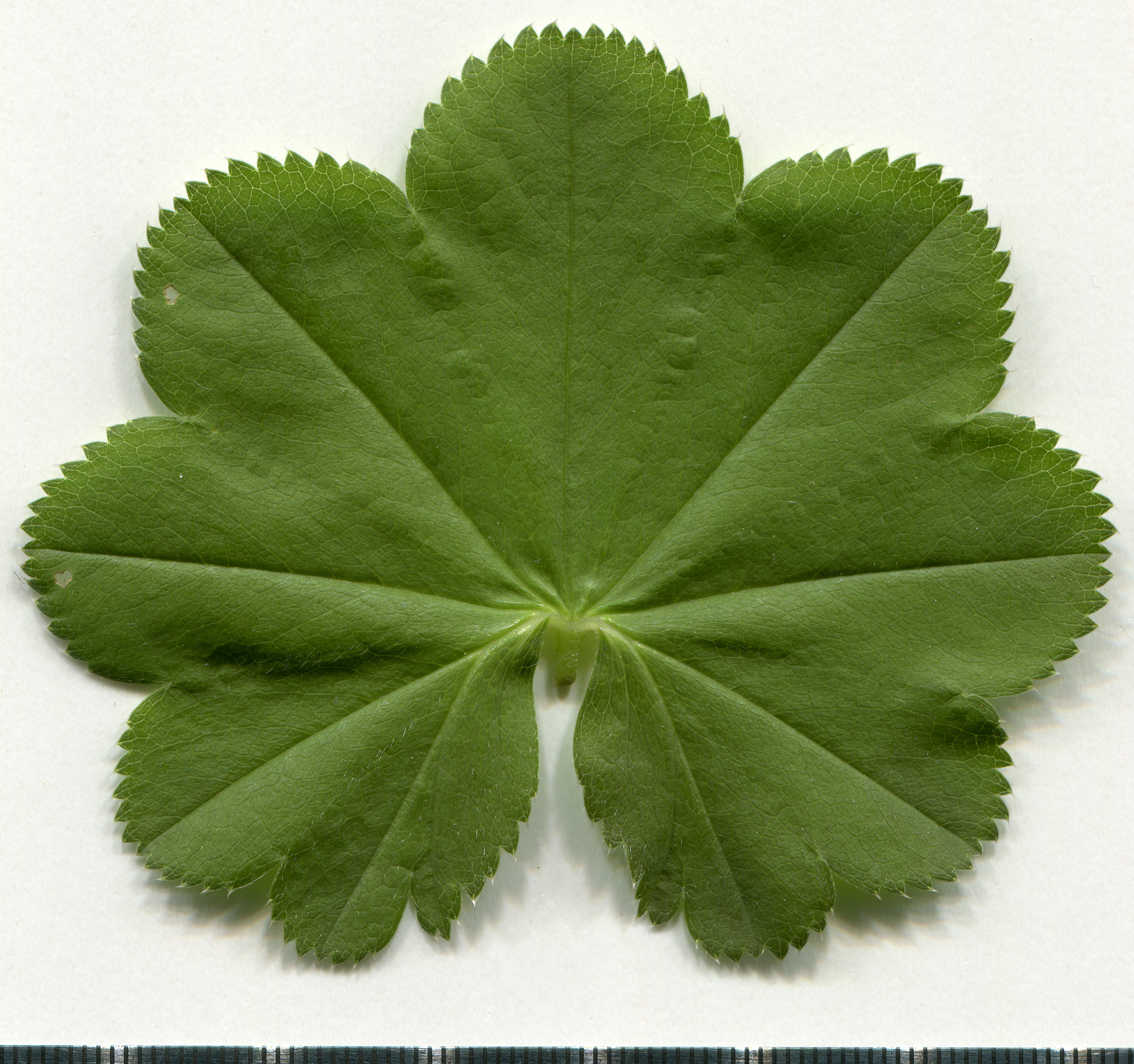
Leaf adaxial side.

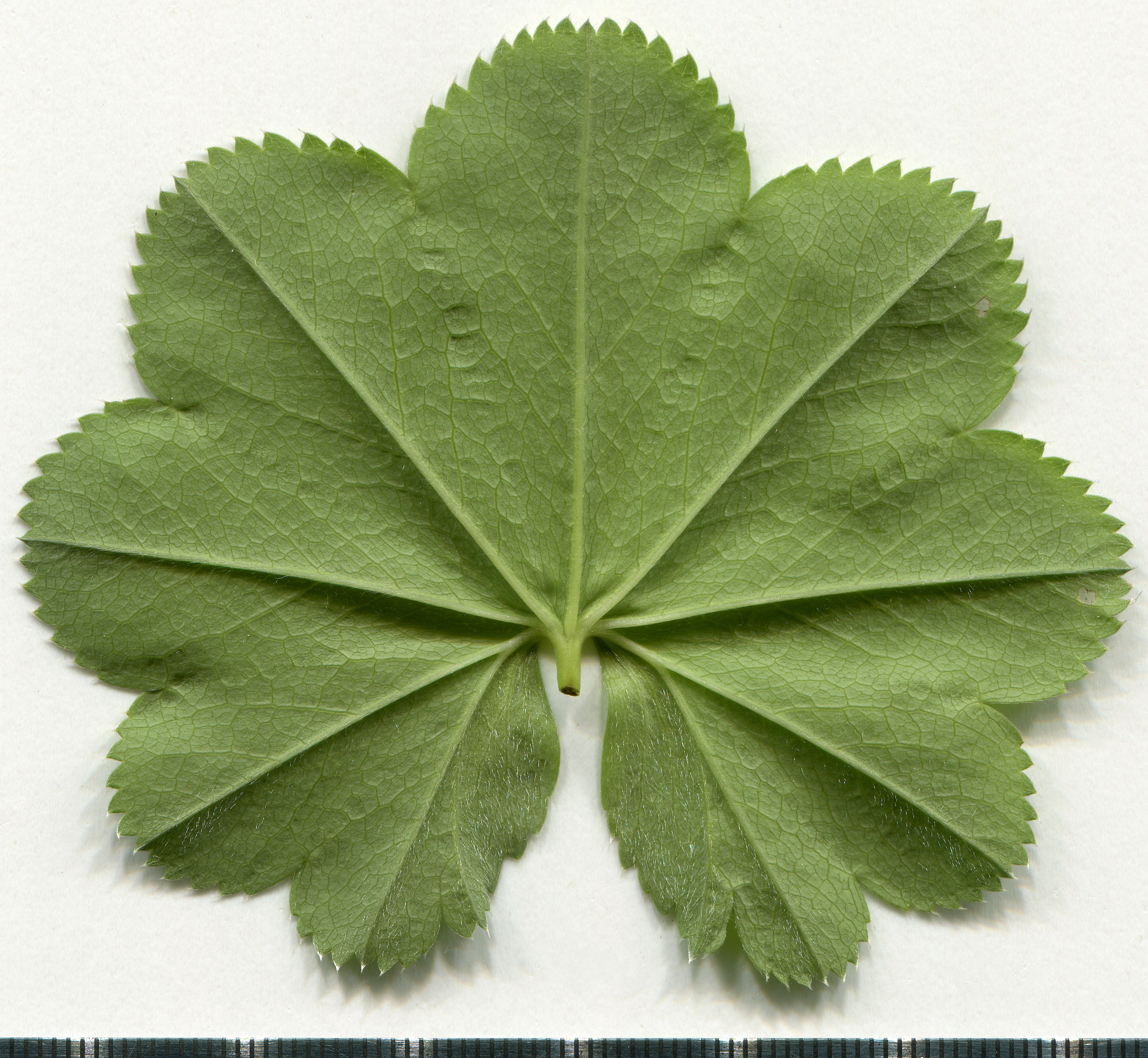
Leaf abaxial side.

== Identification ==
The distinctively corrugated and lobed (5 to 11 lobes with the upper leaves having fewer) kidney-shaped to semicircular leaves of Alchemilla make identification to genus level fairly straightforward.

The yellowish-green flowers form clusters. Each individual flower is typically 3mm in diameter, with no true petals but a four-lobed epicalyx, four sepals and usually four but sometimes five stamens.

In Britain and Ireland the tiny flowers of Alchemilla vulgaris can be seen from June through to September.

Alchemilla mollis, a rather larger species but otherwise very similar, is quite a common garden escape that sometimes appears in hedgerows and on unkempt grassland.

Other common names for lady's mantle are nine hooks, bear's foot, and lion's foot.

== Species interactions ==
Alchemilla vulgaris is a known host to a least three species of fungi, Coleroa alchemillae, Phoma herbarum and Ramularia aplospora.
