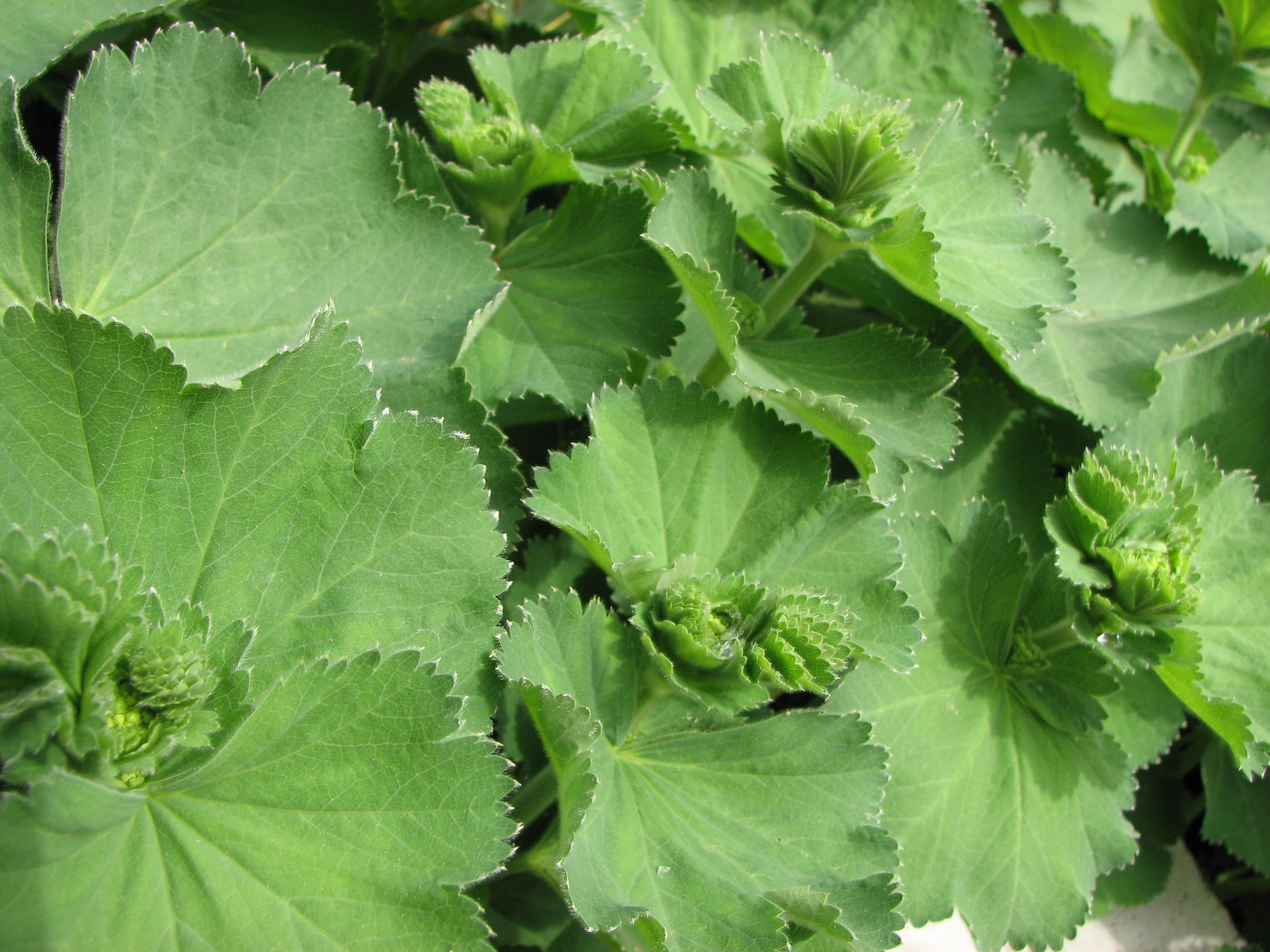
- Alchemilla vulgaris
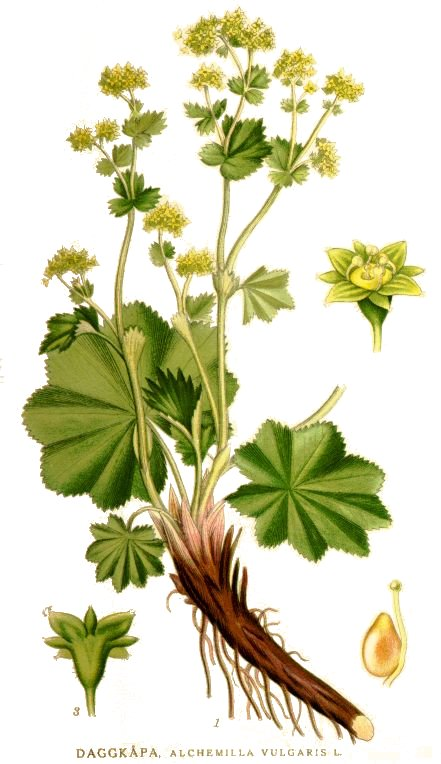
- Botanical illustration of Alchemilla vulgaris

Scientific classification
- Kingdom: Plantae
- Clade: Tracheophytes
- Clade: Angiosperms
- Clade: Eudicots
- Clade: Rosids
- Order: Rosales
- Family: Rosaceae
- Subfamily: Rosoideae
- Tribe: Potentilleae
- Subtribe: Fragariinae
- Genus: Alchemilla; L.

Type species
- A. vulgaris

Species
- See text

Synonyms
- Alchimilla Mill.; Aphanes L.; Lachemilla (Focke) Rydb.; Percepier Moench; Zygalchemilla Rydb.

= Alchemilla =

Genus of flowering plants

Alchemilla is a genus of herbaceous perennial plants in the family Rosaceae, with the common name lady's mantle applied generically as well as specifically to Alchemilla mollis when referred to as a garden plant. The plant used as a herbal tea or for medicinal usage such as gynaecological disorders is Alchemilla xanthochlora or in Middle Europe the so-called common lady's mantle Alchemilla vulgaris. There are between 800 and 1000 species, the majority native to cool temperate and subarctic regions of Europe and Asia, with a few species native to the mountains of Africa and the Americas.

Most species of Alchemilla are clump-forming or mounded perennials with basal leaves arising from woody rhizomes. Some species have leaves with lobes that radiate from a common point and others have divided leaves—both are typically fan-shaped with small teeth at the tips. The long-stalked, gray-green to green leaves are often covered with soft hairs, and show a high degree of water-resistance (see Lotus effect). Green to bright chartreuse flowers are small, have no petals and appear in clusters above the foliage in late spring and summer.

== Selected species ==
- Alchemilla abyssinica Fresen.
- Alchemilla alpina L. — alpine lady's mantle
- Alchemilla argyrophylla Oliv.
- Alchemilla barbatiflora Juzepczuk
- Alchemilla bursensis Pawł.
- Alchemilla conjuncta Bab.
- Alchemilla diademata Rothm. — diadem lady's mantle
- Alchemilla ellenbeckii Engl.
- Alchemilla erythropoda — dwarf lady's mantle
- Alchemilla filicaulis Buser — thinstem lady's mantle
- Alchemilla flabellata Buser — fan lady's mantle
- Alchemilla glabra Neygenf. — smooth lady's mantle
- Alchemilla glaucescens Wallr. — waxy lady's mantle
- Alchemilla glomerulans Buser — clustered lady's mantle
- Alchemilla gracilis Engl.
- Alchemilla hungarica Soó
- Alchemilla japonica Nakai & H. Hara
- Alchemilla jaroschenkoi Grossh. — holotrichous lady's mantle
- Alchemilla johnstonii Oliv.
- Alchemilla lapeyrousii Buser — Lapeyrous' lady's mantle
- Alchemilla mollis (Buser) Rothm.
- Alchemilla monticola Opiz — hairy lady's mantle
- Alchemilla orbiculata Ruiz & Pav.
- Alchemilla sericata Rchb.
- Alchemilla splendens Christ ex Favrat
- Alchemilla stricta Rothm.
- Alchemilla subcrenata Buser — broadtooth lady's mantle
- Alchemilla stuhlmanii
- Alchemilla subcrenata
- Alchemilla subnivalis Baker f.
- Alchemilla triphylla Rothm.
- Alchemilla venosa Buser — boreal lady's mantle
- Alchemilla vestita
- Alchemilla vulgaris L.
- Alchemilla wichurae (Buser) Stefanss. — grassland lady's mantle
- Alchemilla xanthochlora Rothm.
