= List of vascular plants of the Karelian Isthmus =

This is a comprehensive list of the vascular plants of the Karelian Isthmus, a land mass in Russia connected to Finland on one side and otherwise surrounded by three bodies of water: the Gulf of Finland, the Neva River, and Lake Ladoga.

== Pteridophyta ==
=== Aspleniaceae ===
- Asplenium septentrionale - rare
- Asplenium trichomanes - rare

=== Athyriaceae ===
- Athyrium filix-femina – common
- Cystopteris fragilis - rare
- Diplazium sibiricum – rare
- Gymnocarpium dryopteris - common

=== Botrychiaceae ===
- Botrychium lanceolatum - rare
- Botrychium lunaria
- Botrychium matricariifolium - rare
- Botrychium multifidum
- Botrychium simplex - rare
- Botrychium virginianum - rare

=== Dennstaedtiaceae ===
- Pteridium aquilinum - common

=== Dryopteridaceae ===
- Dryopteris carthusiana - common
- Dryopteris cristata
- Dryopteris expansa - common
- Dryopteris filix-mas - common

=== Equisetaceae ===
- Equisetum arvense - common
- Equisetum fluviatile - common
- Equisetum hyemale - common
- Equisetum × litorale
- Equisetum palustre - common
- Equisetum pratense - common
- Equisetum sylvaticum - common
- Equisetum variegatum

=== Onocleaceae ===
- Matteuccia struthiopteris – common

=== Ophioglossaceae ===
- Ophioglossum vulgatum

=== Polypodiaceae ===
- Polypodium vulgare

=== Thelypteridaceae ===
- Phegopteris connectilis - common
- Thelypteris palustris

=== Woodsiaceae ===
- Woodsia ilvensis

== Lycopodiophyta ==
=== Huperziaceae ===
- Huperzia selago - common

=== Isoetaceae ===
- Isoetes echinospora
- Isoetes lacustris

=== Lycopodiaceae ===
- Diphasiastrum complanatum - common
- Diphasiastrum tristachyum
- Diphasiastrum × zeileri
- Lycopodiella inundata
- Lycopodium annotinum - common
- Lycopodium clavatum - common

=== Selaginellaceae ===
- Selaginella selaginoides - extinct

== Pinophyta ==
=== Cupressaceae ===
- Juniperus communis - common

=== Pinaceae ===
- Pinus sylvestris - common
- Picea abies - common
- Picea × fennica

== Magnoliophyta ==
=== Liliopsida ===
==== Alismataceae ====
- Alisma gramineum - rare
- Alisma × juzepczukii - rare
- Alisma plantago-aquatica - common
- Alisma wahlenbergii
- Sagittaria sagittifolia - common

==== Alliaceae ====
- Allium angulosum - rare
- Allium oleraceum
- Allium schoenoprasum

==== Araceae ====
- Calla palustris - common
- Spirodela polyrhiza - common

==== Butomaceae ====
- Butomus umbellatus

==== Cyperaceae ====
- Blysmus rufus
- Bolboschoenus maritimus
- Carex acuta - common
- Carex acutiformis - rare
- Carex appropinquata - rare
- Carex aquatilis - rare
- Carex arenaria
- Carex atherodes - rare
- Carex bergrothii - rare
- Carex bohemica - rare
- Carex brunnescens - common
- Carex buxbaumii - rare
- Carex canescens - common
- Carex caryophyllea - extinct
- Carex cespitosa - common
- Carex chordorrhiza - common
- Carex contigua - rare
- Carex diandra - common
- Carex digitata
- Carex dioica
- Carex disperma - common
- Carex disticha - rare
- Carex echinata - common
- Carex elata - rare
- Carex elongata - common
- Carex ericetorum - common
- Carex flava - common
- Carex glareosa - rare
- Carex globularis - common
- Carex hartmanii - rare
- Carex heleonastes - rare
- Carex hirta - common
- Carex juncella - common
- Carex lasiocarpa - common
- Carex lepidocarpa - rare
- Carex leporina - common
- Carex limosa - common
- Carex livida - rare
- Carex loliacea
- Carex mackenziei - rare
- Carex muricata - rare
- Carex nigra - common
- Carex omskiana - rare
- Carex otrubae - rare
- Carex pallescens - common
- Carex panicea - common
- Carex paniculata - rare
- Carex pauciflora - common
- Carex paupercula - common
- Carex pilulifera
- Carex praecox - introduced, rare
- Carex pseudocyperus - common
- Carex rhynchophysa
- Carex riparia - rare
- Carex rostrata - common
- Carex scandinavica - rare
- Carex serotina
- Carex sylvatica - rare
- Carex vaginata - common
- Carex vesicaria - common
- Carex vulpina - rare
- Eleocharis acicularis - common
- Eleocharis fennica
- Eleocharis mamillata
- Eleocharis palustris - common
- Eleocharis parvula - rare
- Eleocharis quinqueflora - rare
- Eriophorum angustifolium - common
- Eriophorum gracile
- Eriophorum latifolium
- Eriophorum vaginatum - common
- Rhynchospora alba
- Rhynchospora fusca - rare
- Scirpus lacustris - common
- Scirpus radicans
- Scirpus sylvaticus - common
- Scirpus tabernaemontani
- Trichophorum alpinum
- Trichophorum cespitosum - rare

==== Hydrocharitaceae ====
- Caulinia tenuissima - rare
- Elodea canadensis - introduced, common
- Hydrocharis morsus-ranae - common
- Najas marina - rare
- Stratiotes aloides - common

==== Iridaceae ====
- Iris pseudacorus - common

==== Juncaceae ====
- Juncus alpinoarticulatus - common
- Juncus articulatus - common
- Juncus balticus
- Juncus bufonius - common
- Juncus bulbosus
- Juncus capitatus - extinct
- Juncus compressus - common
- Juncus conglomeratus - common
- Juncus effusus - common
- Juncus filiformis - common
- Juncus fischerianus - rare
- Juncus gerardii
- Juncus hylanderi - rare
- Juncus nastanthus - common
- Juncus nodulosus - common
- Juncus ranarius - common
- Juncus squarrosus
- Juncus stygius - rare
- Juncus tenuis - introduced, common
- Luzula campestris - rare
- Luzula multiflora - common
- Luzula pallidula - common
- Luzula pilosa - common

==== Juncaginaceae ====
- Triglochin maritimum
- Triglochin palustris - common

==== Lemnaceae ====
- Lemna gibba - rare
- Lemna minor - common
- Lemna trisulca - common

==== Liliaceae ====
- Gagea lutea - rare
- Gagea minima

==== Orchidaceae ====
- Calypso bulbosa - extinct
- Coeloglossum viride - rare
- Corallorhiza trifida
- Cypripedium calceolus - extinct
- Dactylorhiza baltica - rare
- Dactylorhiza fuchsii - common
- Dactylorhiza incarnata
- Dactylorhiza maculata - common
- Dactylorhiza traunsteineri - rare
- Epipactis atrorubens - rare
- Epipactis helleborine
- Epipactis palustris - rare
- Epipogium aphyllum - rare
- Goodyera repens - common
- Gymnadenia conopsea
- Neottia cordata - rare
- Neottia ovata
- Malaxis monophyllos - rare
- Malaxis paludosa
- Neottia nidus-avis
- Platanthera bifolia
- Platanthera chlorantha - rare

==== Poaceae ====
- Agropyron pectinatum - introduced, rare
- Agrostis canina - common
- Agrostis capillaris - common
- Agrostis gigantea - common
- Agrostis stolonifera - common
- Agrostis straminea
- Alopecurus aequalis - common
- Alopecurus arundinaceus - rare
- Alopecurus geniculatus - common
- Alopecurus pratensis - common
- Anisantha tectorum - introduced, rare
- Anthoxanthum odoratum - common
- Apera spica-venti
- Arrhenatherum elatius - introduced, rare
- Avena fatua - introduced, rare
- Avena strigosa - introduced
- Brachypodium pinnatum - rare
- Briza media - common
- Bromus inermis - common
- Bromus mollis - introduced
- Calamagrostis arundinacea - common
- Calamagrostis canescens - common
- Calamagrostis epigeios - common
- Calamagrostis meinshausenii - common
- Calamagrostis neglecta - common
- Calamagrostis phragmitoides - common
- Calamagrostis purpurea - rare
- Catabrosa aquatica - rare
- Cinna latifolia - rare
- Dactylis glomerata - common
- Dactylis polygama - introduced, rare
- Deschampsia cespitosa - common
- Deschampsia flexuosa - common
- Echinochloa crusgalli - introduced
- Elymus caninus - common
- Elytrigia repens - common
- Festuca arenaria - rare
- Festuca brevipila - rare
- Festuca gigantea
- Festuca ovina - common
- Festuca polesica - rare
- Festuca pratensis - common
- Festuca rubra - common
- Festuca sabulosa
- Glyceria fluitans - common
- Glyceria lithuanica - rare
- Glyceria maxima - common
- Glyceria notata - common
- Helictotrichon pubescens
- Hierochloe arctica - common
- Hierochloe australis - rare
- Hierochloe baltica - common
- Hierochloe hirta - rare
- Holcus mollis
- Koeleria delavignei - introduced, rare
- Koeleria glauca - introduced, rare
- Leersia oryzoides
- Leymus arenarius
- Melica nutans - common
- Melica picta - rare
- Milium effusum - common
- Molinia caerulea - common
- Nardus stricta
- Panicum miliaceum - introduced, rare
- Phalaris arundinacea - common
- Phalaris canariensis - introduced, rare
- Phleum pratense - common
- Phragmites australis - common
- Poa angustifolia - common
- Poa annua - common
- Poa compressa - common
- Poa humilis - common
- Poa nemoralis - common
- Poa palustris - common
- Poa pratensis - common
- Poa remota
- Poa supina - introduced, rare
- Poa trivialis - common
- Puccinellia distans - introduced
- Puccinellia hauptiana - introduced, rare
- Puccinellia pulvinata - rare
- Scolochloa festucacea
- Setaria faberi - introduced, rare
- Setaria pumila - introduced, rare
- Setaria pycnocoma - introduced, rare
- Setaria viridis - introduced
- Sieglingia decumbens

==== Potamogetonaceae ====
- Potamogeton alpinus - common
- Potamogeton berchtoldii - common
- Potamogeton compressus - common
- Potamogeton crispus - rare
- Potamogeton filiformis - rare
- Potamogeton friesii - rare
- Potamogeton gramineus - common
- Potamogeton lucens - common
- Potamogeton natans - common
- Potamogeton obtusifolius
- Potamogeton pectinatus - common
- Potamogeton perfoliatus - common
- Potamogeton praelongus - rare
- Potamogeton pusillus
- Potamogeton rutilus - rare
- Potamogeton trichoides - rare
- Zannichellia palustris

==== Ruppiaceae ====
- Ruppia brachypus - rare

==== Ruscaceae ====
- Convallaria majalis - common
- Maianthemum bifolium - common
- Polygonatum multiflorum
- Polygonatum odoratum - common

==== Scheuchzeriaceae ====
- Scheuchzeria palustris - common

==== Sparganiaceae ====
- Sparganium angustifolium
- Sparganium emersum - common
- Sparganium glomeratum
- Sparganium gramineum
- Sparganium microcarpum - common
- Sparganium minimum - common

==== Trilliaceae ====
- Paris quadrifolia - common

==== Typhaceae ====
- Typha angustifolia
- Typha latifolia - common

=== Magnoliopsida ===
==== Aceraceae ====
- Acer platanoides

==== Adoxaceae ====
- Adoxa moschatellina
- Viburnum opulus - common

==== Amaranthaceae ====
- Amaranthus retroflexus - introduced, rare
- Atriplex calotheca - rare
- Atriplex littoralis
- Atriplex longipes - rare
- Atriplex patula - introduced, common
- Atriplex prostrata - common
- Atriplex sagittata - introduced
- Chenopodium album - introduced, common
- Chenopodium glaucum - introduced, common
- Chenopodium polyspermum - introduced
- Chenopodium rubrum - introduced, common
- Chenopodium suecicum - introduced
- Corispermum membranaceum - introduced, rare
- Salsola kali

==== Apiaceae ====
- Aegopodium podagraria - common
- Angelica sylvestris - common
- Anthriscus sylvestris - common
- Archangelica litoralis
- Carum carvi - common
- Chaerophyllum aromaticum - rare
- Chaerophyllum aureum - introduced, rare
- Cicuta virosa - common
- Conioselinum tataricum - rare
- Conium maculatum - introduced
- Heracleum sibiricum - common
- Heracleum sphondylium - introduced, rare
- Kadenia dubia - rare
- Oenanthe aquatica
- Pastinaca sativa - introduced
- Pimpinella saxifraga - common
- Selinum carvifolia
- Sium latifolium
- Thyselium palustre - common

==== Aristolochiaceae ====
- Asarum europaeum - rare

==== Asteraceae ====
- Achillea millefolium - common
- Antennaria dioica - common
- Anthemis arvensis - introduced
- Anthemis tinctoria - introduced
- Arctium lappa - introduced, rare
- Arctium minus - introduced
- Arctium tomentosum - introduced, common
- Artemisia absinthium - introduced
- Artemisia austriaca - introduced, rare
- Artemisia campestris - common
- Artemisia pontica - introduced, rare
- Artemisia sieversiana - introduced, rare
- Artemisia vulgaris - common
- Bidens cernua
- Bidens radiata
- Bidens tripartita - common
- Carduus crispus - common
- Carlina fennica
- Centaurea cyanus - introduced
- Centaurea diffusa - introduced, rare
- Centaurea jacea - common
- Centaurea phrygia - common
- Centaurea scabiosa - common
- Cichorium intybus - introduced
- Cirsium arvense - common
- Cirsium heterophyllum - common
- Cirsium oleraceum
- Cirsium palustre - common
- Cirsium vulgare - introduced, common
- Conyza canadensis - introduced, common
- Crepis czerepanovii - rare
- Crepis paludosa - common
- Crepis tectorum - common
- Erigeron acris - common
- Erigeron droebachiensis - introduced, rare
- Eupatorium cannabinum - rare
- Filago arvensis - common
- Galinsoga ciliata - introduced, rare
- Galinsoga parviflora - introduced, rare
- Gnaphalium pilulare - rare
- Gnaphalium uliginosum - common
- Hieracium aggr. aestivum:

- Hieracium ahtii - rare
- Hieracium reticulatum - rare

- Hieracium aggr. bifidum:

- Hieracium chlorellum - rare
- Hieracium crispulum - rare
- Hieracium prolixum - rare
- Hieracium triangulare - rare

- Hieracium aggr. caesiomurorum:

- Hieracium caesiomurorum - rare
- Hieracium fulvescens - rare

- Hieracium aggr. caesium:

- Hieracium caesium - rare
- Hieracium coniops - rare
- Hieracium laeticolor - rare
- Hieracium plumbeum - rare
- Hieracium ravidum

- Hieracium aggr. diaphanoides:

- Hieracium caespiticola - rare
- Hieracium chloromaurum - rare
- Hieracium diaphanoides - rare
- Hieracium pseudopellucidum - rare
- Hieracium silenii
- Hieracium subpellucidum

- Hieracium aggr. fuscocinereum:

- Hieracium godbyense - rare
- Hieracium oistophyllum - rare
- Hieracium penduliforme - rare
- Hieracium philanthrax
- Hieracium karelorum

- Hieracium aggr. kuusamoense:

- Hieracium prolatatum - rare

- Hieracium aggr. laevigatum:

- Hieracium laevigatum
- Hieracium lissolepium - rare
- Hieracium tridentatum - rare

- Hieracium aggr. murorum:

- Hieracium dispansiforme - rare
- Hieracium distendens
- Hieracium hjeltii - rare
- Hieracium lepistoides
- Hieracium morulum
- Hieracium patale
- Hieracium pellucidum - rare
- Hieracium praetenerum
- Hieracium subcaesium
- Hieracium submarginellum

- Hieracium aggr. umbellatum:

- Hieracium umbellatum - common

- Hieracium aggr. vulgatum:

- Hieracium diversifolium
- Hieracium incurrens
- Hieracium vulgatum - common

- Inula britannica
- Inula salicina
- Lactuca serriola - introduced, rare
- Lactuca sibirica
- Lactuca tatarica - introduced, rare
- Lapsana communis - introduced, common
- Leontodon autumnalis - common
- Leontodon hispidus - common
- Lepidotheca suaveolens - introduced, common
- Leucanthemum vulgare - common
- Ligularia sibirica - extinct
- Matricaria recutita - introduced, rare
- Mycelis muralis - rare
- Omalotheca sylvatica - common
- Phalacroloma strigosum - introduced
- Picris hieracioides
- Pilosella caespitosa
- Pilosella cymella
- Pilosella × floribunda - common
- Pilosella lactucella - rare
- Pilosella officinarum - common
- Pilosella onegensis
- Pilosella praealta
- Ptarmica vulgaris - common
- Scorzonera humilis
- Senecio aquaticus - rare
- Senecio jacobaea - introduced, rare
- Senecio paludosus - rare
- Senecio sylvaticus - introduced, rare
- Senecio viscosus - common
- Senecio vulgaris - introduced, common
- Solidago virgaurea - common
- Sonchus arvensis - introduced, common
- Sonchus asper - introduced
- Sonchus humilis - rare
- Sonchus oleraceus - introduced, common
- Tanacetum vulgare - common
- Taraxacum officinale - common
- Tragopogon pratensis - introduced
- Tripleurospermum maritimum - rare
- Tripleurospermum perforatum - introduced, common
- Tripleurospermum subpolare
- Tripolium vulgare - rare
- Trommsdorffia maculata - common
- Tussilago farfara - common

==== Balsaminaceae ====
- Impatiens noli-tangere - common
- Impatiens parviflora - introduced, common

==== Betulaceae ====
- Alnus glutinosa - common
- Alnus incana - common
- Betula nana
- Betula pendula - common
- Betula pubescens - common
- Corylus avellana

==== Boraginaceae ====
- Anchusa officinalis - introduced
- Buglossoides arvensis - introduced, rare
- Cynoglossum officinale - introduced, rare
- Echium vulgare - introduced
- Lappula squarrosa - introduced
- Lycopsis arvensis - introduced, rare
- Myosotis arvensis - introduced, common
- Myosotis caespitosa - common
- Myosotis micrantha - common
- Myosotis palustris - common
- Myosotis ramosissima - rare
- Myosotis sparsiflora - common
- Pulmonaria obscura
- Symphytum officinale - common

==== Brassicaceae ====
- Alliaria petiolata – introduced, rare
- Alyssum alyssoides – introduced, rare
- Arabidopsis × suecica
- Arabidopsis thaliana – common
- Barbarea arcuata – common
- Barbarea stricta – common
- Berteroa incana – introduced, common
- Brassica campestris – introduced, common
- Bunias orientalis – introduced, common
- Cakile baltica
- Camelina microcarpa – introduced, rare
- Camelina sylvestris – introduced, rare
- Capsella bursa-pastoris – introduced, common
- Cardamine amara – common
- Cardamine dentata – common
- Cardamine parviflora – rare
- Cardamine pratensis
- Cardaminopsis arenosa – common
- Dentaria bulbifera – rare
- Descurainia sophia – introduced, common
- Diplotaxis muralis – introduced, rare
- Draba incana – rare
- Draba nemorosa
- Erophila verna
- Erucastrum gallicum – introduced, rare
- Erysimum canescens – introduced, rare
- Erysimum cheiranthoides – introduced, common
- Erysimum cuspidatum
- Isatis tinctoria
- Lepidium campestre – introduced, rare
- Lepidium densiflorum – introduced, common
- Lepidium latifolium – introduced, rare
- Lepidium ruderale – introduced, common
- Neslia paniculata – introduced
- Raphanus raphanistrum – introduced, common
- Rorippa × armoracioides – introduced, rare
- Rorippa amphibia – rare
- Rorippa austriaca – introduced, rare
- Rorippa palustris – common
- Rorippa sylvestris – common
- Sinapis arvensis – introduced
- Sisymbrium altissimum – introduced
- Sisymbrium loeselii – introduced
- Sisymbrium officinale – introduced, common
- Sisymbrium wolgense – introduced, rare
- Subularia aquatica
- Thlaspi alpestre – introduced
- Thlaspi arvense – introduced, common
- Turritis glabra – common

==== Campanulaceae ====
- Campanula cervicaria
- Campanula glomerata - common
- Campanula latifolia
- Campanula patula - common
- Campanula persicifolia - common
- Campanula rapunculoides - introduced
- Campanula rotundifolia - common
- Campanula trachelium
- Jasione montana

==== Cannabaceae ====
- Humulus lupulus - common
- Cannabis ruderalis - introduced, rare

==== Caprifoliaceae ====
- Linnaea borealis - common
- Lonicera xylosteum - common

==== Caryophyllaceae ====
- Arenaria serpyllifolia
- Cerastium arvense - common
- Cerastium holosteoides - common
- Coccyganthe flos-cuculi - common
- Dianthus arenarius
- Dianthus deltoides - common
- Gypsophila fastigiata - rare
- Herniaria glabra
- Honckenya peploides
- Melandrium album - introduced, common
- Melandrium dioicum - common
- Moehringia trinervia - common
- Myosoton aquaticum
- Oberna behen - common
- Psammophiliella muralis introduced
- Sagina nodosa
- Sagina procumbens - common
- Scleranthus annuus - common
- Scleranthus perennis - rare
- Silene nutans - common
- Silene rupestris - rare
- Silene tatarica - introduced, rare
- Spergula arvensis - introduced, common
- Spergula morisonii
- Spergularia marina - rare
- Spergularia rubra - common
- Stellaria alsine
- Stellaria crassifolia - rare
- Stellaria graminea - common
- Stellaria holostea - common
- Stellaria longifolia
- Stellaria media - common
- Stellaria nemorum - common
- Stellaria palustris - common
- Viscaria alpina
- Viscaria viscosa - common

==== Ceratophyllaceae ====
- Ceratophyllum demersum - common

==== Clusiaceae ====
- Hypericum maculatum - common
- Hypericum perforatum - common

==== Convolvulaceae ====
- Calystegia sepium - common
- Convolvulus arvensis - introduced, common
- Cuscuta europaea
- Cuscuta halophyta - rare

==== Cornaceae ====
- Cornus suecica

==== Crassulaceae ====
- Hylotelephium decumbens - common
- Hylotelephium triphyllum - common
- Sedum acre - common
- Tillaea aquatica

==== Dipsacaceae ====
- Knautia arvensis - common
- Succisa pratensis - common

==== Droseraceae ====
- Drosera anglica - common
- Drosera intermedia - rare
- Drosera × obovata - common
- Drosera rotundifolia - common

==== Elatinaceae ====
- Elatine hydropiper
- Elatine orthosperma - extinct
- Elatine triandra

==== Ericaceae ====
- Andromeda polifolia - common
- Arctostaphylos uva-ursi - common
- Calluna vulgaris - common
- Chamaedaphne calyculata - common
- Chimaphila umbellata
- Empetrum hermaphroditum
- Empetrum nigrum - common
- Empetrum subholarcticum
- Hypopitys monotropa - common
- Ledum palustre - common
- Moneses uniflora
- Orthilia secunda - common
- Oxycoccus microcarpus
- Oxycoccus palustris - common
- Pyrola chlorantha
- Pyrola media
- Pyrola minor - common
- Pyrola rotundifolia - common
- Vaccinium myrtillus - common
- Vaccinium uliginosum - common
- Vaccinium vitis-idaea - common

==== Euphorbiaceae ====
- Euphorbia esula - rare
- Euphorbia helioscopia - introduced, rare
- Euphorbia palustris
- Euphorbia seguieriana - introduced, rare
- Euphorbia virgata - introduced, common
- Mercurialis perennis - rare

==== Fabaceae ====
- Anthyllis colorata - introduced, rare
- Anthyllis macrocephala - introduced, rare
- Astragalus danicus - introduced, rare
- Astragalus subpolaris - rare
- Chrysaspis aurea - common
- Chrysaspis campestris - introduced, rare
- Chrysaspis spadicea - common
- Lathyrus linifolius - rare
- Lathyrus maritimus
- Lathyrus palustris
- Lathyrus pisiformis - introduced, rare
- Lathyrus pratensis - common
- Lathyrus sylvestris - common
- Lathyrus tuberosus - introduced, rare
- Lathyrus vernus - common
- Lotus ambiguus - introduced, common
- Lotus callunetorum - common
- Lotus corniculatus - introduced, common
- Lotus ruprechtii
- Medicago falcata - introduced
- Medicago lupulina - introduced, common
- Melilotus albus - introduced, common
- Melilotus officinalis - introduced, common
- Ononis repens - introduced
- Oxytropis sordida - rare
- Securigera varia - introduced, rare
- Trifolium arvense - common
- Trifolium hybridum - introduced, common
- Trifolium medium - common
- Trifolium montanum - introduced, rare
- Trifolium pratense - common
- Trifolium repens - common
- Vicia angustifolia - introduced
- Vicia biennis - introduced, rare
- Vicia cracca - common
- Vicia hirsuta - introduced
- Vicia sepium - common
- Vicia sylvatica - common
- Vicia tetrasperma - introduced
- Vicia villosa - introduced, rare

==== Fagaceae ====
- Quercus robur

==== Fumariaceae ====
- Corydalis intermedia - rare
- Corydalis solida
- Fumaria officinalis - introduced, common

==== Gentianaceae ====
- Centaurium erythraea - rare
- Centaurium littorale
- Centaurium pulchellum - rare
- Gentiana pneumonanthe - rare
- Gentianella amarella - rare
- Gentianella campestris - rare

==== Geraniaceae ====
- Erodium cicutarium - introduced
- Geranium bohemicum - rare
- Geranium palustre
- Geranium pratense - common
- Geranium robertianum
- Geranium sibiricum - introduced, rare
- Geranium sylvaticum - common

==== Grossulariaceae ====
- Ribes alpinum
- Ribes nigrum - common
- Ribes spicatum - common

==== Haloragaceae ====
- Myriophyllum alterniflorum
- Myriophyllum sibiricum - common
- Myriophyllum spicatum - rare
- Myriophyllum verticillatum - common

==== Lamiaceae ====
- Acinos arvensis, synonym of Clinopodium acinos
- Ajuga pyramidalis
- Ajuga reptans
- Betonica officinalis - introduced, rare
- Clinopodium vulgare - common
- Dracocephalum thymiflorum - introduced, rare
- Galeobdolon luteum
- Galeopsis bifida - introduced, common
- Galeopsis ladanum - introduced
- Galeopsis speciosa - introduced, common
- Galeopsis tetrahit - introduced, common
- Glechoma hederacea - common
- Lamium album - introduced, common
- Lamium hybridum - introduced
- Lamium purpureum - introduced, common
- Leonurus cardiaca - introduced, rare
- Lycopus europaeus - common
- Mentha aquatica - rare
- Mentha arvensis - common
- Prunella vulgaris - common
- Scutellaria galericulata - common
- Scutellaria hastifolia
- Stachys palustris - common
- Stachys recta - introduced, rare
- Stachys sylvatica - common
- Thymus ovatus - rare
- Thymus serpyllum - common

==== Lentibulariaceae ====
- Pinguicula vulgaris - extinct
- Utricularia australis - rare
- Utricularia intermedia
- Utricularia minor
- Utricularia ochroleuca - rare
- Utricularia vulgaris - common

==== Linaceae ====
- Linum catharticum
- Linum usitatissimum - introduced, common

==== Lobeliaceae ====
- Lobelia dortmanna

==== Lythraceae ====
- Lythrum intermedium
- Lythrum salicaria - common
- Peplis portula

==== Malvaceae ====
- Malva pusilla - introduced, rare
- Tilia cordata

==== Menyanthaceae ====
- Menyanthes trifoliata - common

==== Myricaceae ====
- Myrica gale

==== Myrsinaceae ====
- Centunculus minimus - rare
- Glaux maritima
- Lysimachia nummularia - rare
- Lysimachia vulgaris - common
- Naumburgia thyrsiflora - common
- Trientalis europaea - common

==== Nymphaeaceae ====
- Nuphar lutea - common
- Nuphar pumila
- Nymphaea candida - common
- Nymphaea tetragona - rare

==== Oleaceae ====
- Fraxinus excelsior

==== Onagraceae ====
- Chamaenerion angustifolium - common
- Circaea alpina
- Epilobium adenocaulon - introduced, common
- Epilobium bergianum - introduced, rare
- Epilobium collinum
- Epilobium hirsutum - common
- Epilobium montanum - common
- Epilobium obscurum - extinct
- Epilobium palustre - common
- Epilobium pseudorubescens - introduced, common
- Epilobium roseum - common
- Oenothera rubricaulis

==== Orobanchaceae ====
- Euphrasia brevipila - common
- Euphrasia fennica - common
- Euphrasia glabrescens - common
- Euphrasia hirtella - rare
- Euphrasia parviflora - common
- Euphrasia vernalis - common
- Lathraea squamaria - rare
- Melampyrum cristatum - rare
- Melampyrum nemorosum - common
- Melampyrum pratense - common
- Melampyrum sylvaticum - common
- Odontites litoralis
- Odontites vulgaris - common
- Pedicularis kaufmannii - rare
- Pedicularis palustris - common
- Pedicularis sceptrum-carolinum - rare
- Rhinanthus minor - common
- Rhinanthus serotinus - common

==== Oxalidaceae ====
- Oxalis acetosella - common

==== Papaveraceae ====
- Chelidonium majus - introduced, common
- Papaver rhoeas - introduced, rare

==== Parnassiaceae ====
- Parnassia palustris

==== Plantaginaceae ====
- Callitriche cophocarpa - common
- Callitriche hermaphroditica
- Callitriche palustris - common
- Chaenorhinum minus - introduced, rare
- Hippuris vulgaris - common
- Linaria genistifolia - introduced, rare
- Littorella uniflora - rare
- Plantago lanceolata - common
- Plantago major - common
- Plantago maritima
- Plantago media - common
- Veronica anagallis-aquatica - rare
- Veronica arvensis - introduced
- Veronica beccabunga
- Veronica chamaedrys - common
- Veronica longifolia - common
- Veronica officinalis - common
- Veronica scutellata - common
- Veronica serpyllifolia - common
- Veronica spicata - rare
- Veronica verna - common

==== Plumbaginaceae ====
- Armeria vulgaris - rare

==== Polemoniaceae ====
- Polemonium caeruleum

==== Polygalaceae ====
- Polygala amarella
- Polygala vulgaris

==== Polygonaceae ====
- Bistorta vivipara
- Fagopyrum tataricum - introduced, rare
- Fallopia convolvulus - introduced, common
- Fallopia dumetorum
- Persicaria amphibia - common
- Persicaria foliosa - rare
- Persicaria hydropiper - common
- Persicaria lapathifolia - common
- Persicaria maculosa
- Persicaria minor - common
- Persicaria mitis - rare
- Persicaria scabra - introduced, common
- Polygonum arenastrum - introduced, common
- Polygonum aviculare - common
- Polygonum boreale - rare
- Polygonum calcatum - introduced, common
- Polygonum neglectum - common
- Polygonum oxyspermum - rare
- Polygonum rurivagum - introduced, rare
- Rumex acetosa - common
- Rumex acetosella - common
- Rumex aquaticus - common
- Rumex confertus - introduced, rare
- Rumex crispus - common
- Rumex hydrolapathum - common
- Rumex longifolius - introduced, common
- Rumex maritimus
- Rumex pseudonatronatus - introduced, rare
- Rumex stenophyllus - introduced, rare
- Rumex sylvestris - common
- Rumex thyrsiflorus - common
- Rumex triangulivalvis - introduced, rare

==== Portulacaceae ====
- Montia fontana
- Portulaca oleracea - introduced

==== Primulaceae ====
- Androsace filiformis - rare
- Androsace septentrionalis
- Hottonia palustris - rare
- Primula veris - rare

==== Ranunculaceae ====
- Aconitum lycoctonum
- Actaea spicata
- Anemone nemorosa - common
- Anemone ranunculoides
- Batrachium circinatum
- Batrachium dichotomum - common
- Batrachium eradicatum - rare
- Batrachium floribundum - rare
- Batrachium kauffmannii - common
- Batrachium marinum
- Batrachium nevense - rare
- Batrachium penicillatum - rare
- Caltha palustris - common
- Consolida regalis -introduced, rare
- Ficaria verna
- Hepatica nobilis
- Myosurus minimus - introduced
- Pulsatilla patens
- Pulsatilla pratensis
- Pulsatilla vernalis
- Ranunculus acris - common
- Ranunculus auricomus - common
- Ranunculus bulbosus - rare
- Ranunculus cassubicus
- Ranunculus fallax - common
- Ranunculus flammula - common
- Ranunculus lingua
- Ranunculus polyanthemos - common
- Ranunculus repens - common
- Ranunculus reptans - common
- Ranunculus sceleratus - common
- Ranunculus subborealis - rare
- Thalictrum aquilegiifolium - rare
- Thalictrum flavum - common
- Thalictrum lucidum - rare
- Thalictrum minus - introduced, rare
- Thalictrum simplex - rare

==== Rhamnaceae ====
- Frangula alnus - common
- Rhamnus cathartica - rare

==== Rosaceae ====
- Agrimonia eupatoria - rare
- Agrimonia pilosa - rare
- Alchemilla acutangula - common
- Alchemilla baltica - common
- Alchemilla cymatophylla - rare
- Alchemilla filicaulis - rare
- Alchemilla glabra - rare
- Alchemilla glabricaulis - rare
- Alchemilla glaucescens - rare
- Alchemilla glomerulans - rare
- Alchemilla hirsuticaulis - common
- Alchemilla micans - common
- Alchemilla monticola - common
- Alchemilla murbeckiana - rare
- Alchemilla obtusa - rare
- Alchemilla plicata - rare
- Alchemilla propinqua - rare
- Alchemilla sarmatica
- Alchemilla subcrenata - common
- Alchemilla xanthochlora - introduced, rare
- Comarum palustre - common
- Filipendula denudata - common
- Filipendula ulmaria - common
- Filipendula vulgaris - rare
- Fragaria moschata - common
- Fragaria vesca - common
- Geum aleppicum - introduced
- Geum rivale - common
- Geum urbanum - common
- Potentilla anserina - common
- Potentilla argentea - common
- Potentilla bifurca - introduced, rare
- Potentilla canescens - rare
- Potentilla erecta - common
- Potentilla goldbachii - common
- Potentilla intermedia - common
- Potentilla norvegica - common
- Potentilla ruthenica - introduced, rare
- Potentilla supina - introduced, rare
- Potentilla verna - rare
- Prunus padus - common
- Rosa majalis - common
- Rubus arcticus
- Rubus caesius - introduced, rare
- Rubus chamaemorus - common
- Rubus idaeus - common
- Rubus nessensis
- Rubus saxatilis - common
- Sorbus aucuparia - common

==== Rubiaceae ====
- Galium album - common
- Galium aparine - introduced, common
- Galium boreale - common
- Galium hercynicum - rare
- Galium mollugo - rare
- Galium odoratum - rare
- Galium palustre - common
- Galium trifidum - common
- Galium triflorum - rare
- Galium uliginosum - common
- Galium vaillantii - introduced, common
- Galium verum - common

==== Salicaceae ====
- Populus tremula - common
- Salix acutifolia
- Salix aurita - common
- Salix caprea - common
- Salix cinerea - common
- Salix lapponum
- Salix myrsinifolia - common
- Salix myrtilloides
- Salix pentandra - common
- Salix phylicifolia - common
- Salix rosmarinifolia
- Salix starkeana - common
- Salix triandra - common
- Salix viminalis - rare

==== Santalaceae ====
- Thesium arvense - introduced, rare

==== Saxifragaceae ====
- Chrysosplenium alternifolium - common
- Saxifraga cespitosa - rare
- Saxifraga hirculus

==== Scrophulariaceae ====
- Limosella aquatica
- Scrophularia nodosa - common
- Verbascum nigrum - common
- Verbascum thapsus

==== Solanaceae ====
- Hyoscyamus niger - introduced
- Solanum dulcamara - common
- Solanum nigrum - introduced, rare

==== Thymelaeaceae ====
- Daphne mezereum

==== Ulmaceae ====
- Ulmus glabra
- Ulmus laevis

==== Urticaceae ====
- Urtica dioica - common
- Urtica urens - introduced

==== Valerianaceae ====
- Valeriana officinalis - common
- Valeriana salina
- Valeriana sambucifolia

==== Violaceae ====
- Viola arvensis - introduced, common
- Viola canina - common
- Viola epipsila - common
- Viola mirabilis
- Viola nemoralis - common
- Viola palustris - common
- Viola persicifolia - rare
- Viola riviniana - common
- Viola rupestris
- Viola selkirkii
- Viola tricolor - common
- Viola uliginosa
