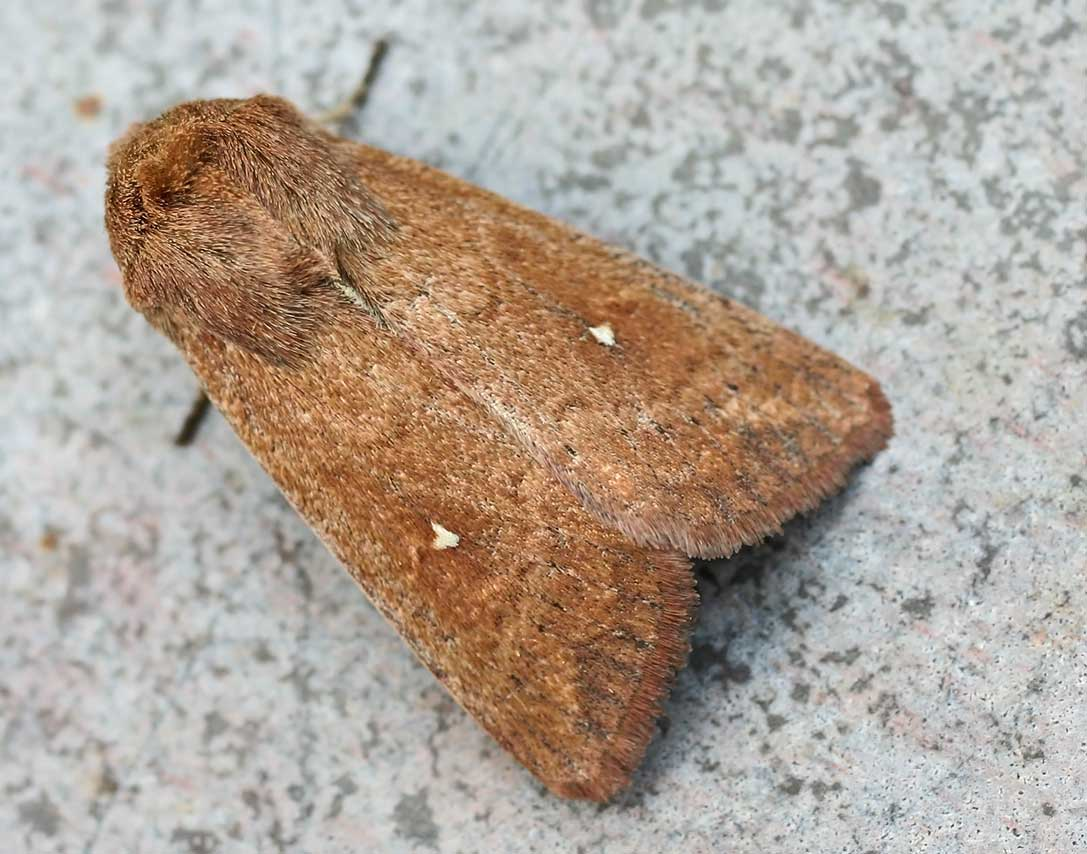

Scientific classification
- Kingdom: Animalia
- Phylum: Arthropoda
- Class: Insecta
- Order: Lepidoptera
- Superfamily: Noctuoidea
- Family: Noctuidae
- Genus: Mythimna
- Species: M. albipuncta

Binomial name
- Mythimna albipuncta (Denis & Schiffermüller, 1775)

Synonyms
- Aletia albipuncta

= Mythimna albipuncta =

White-point

Species of moth

Mythimna albipuncta, the white-point, is a moth of the family Noctuidae. The species was first described by Michael Denis and Ignaz Schiffermüller in 1775. It is distributed throughout Europe and one subspecies is found in Tunisia. It is also found in Asia Minor, Armenia, and Iran, and the northeastern United States.

== Technical description and variation ==
The moth has a wingspan of 30 to 35 mm. The length of the forewings varies from 14 to 17 mm. Forewing rufous brown, dusted with greyer; costal edge whitish; lines brown, conversely edged with paler; outer line obscurely lunulate-dentate, the teeth not marked by dots on veins; submarginal line pale, diffuse, edged outwardly with darker; reniform stigma forming a distinct white spot at lower end of cell; hindwing dark or pale grey, sometimes tinged with rufous or ochreous; in the form known as italogallica Mill, the wings are darker, dull brown; — flecki Carad.; from Romania and the Bukovina, is rather smaller, the forewing dull grey brown, the hindwing fuscous: - in fasciata Spul. the darker brown tints are more strongly developed in median area so as to form a kind of fascia; besides the above already named forms there appear to be two more, equally deserving of a separate name; — ab. ochrea nov. [Warren] is ochreous, dusted with grey, and with a slight flush, rufous in male reddish brown in female, with the lines dark grey and the marginal area darker; the white spot at end of cell as usual; hindwing dirty whitish in male with termen greyer, more wholly grey in female; two males from Silvaplana, Engadine, Switzerland, and one female without locality; — the other, ab. expallidata nov. [Warren] is quite small, smooth pale grey with a tannish-peach tinge; the inner line hardly traceable, but the outer black and distinct throughout; the lunules and the teeth all alike strongly marked; but the usual marginal dark area is here concolorous with rest of wing; the median vein shows dark below the white discal spot; hindwing dirty white, greyer towards termen: One female from Digne, basses Alpes, June 1908.

== Similar species ==
The species is similar to Mythimna conigera, Mythimna ferrago and Mythimna unipuncta.

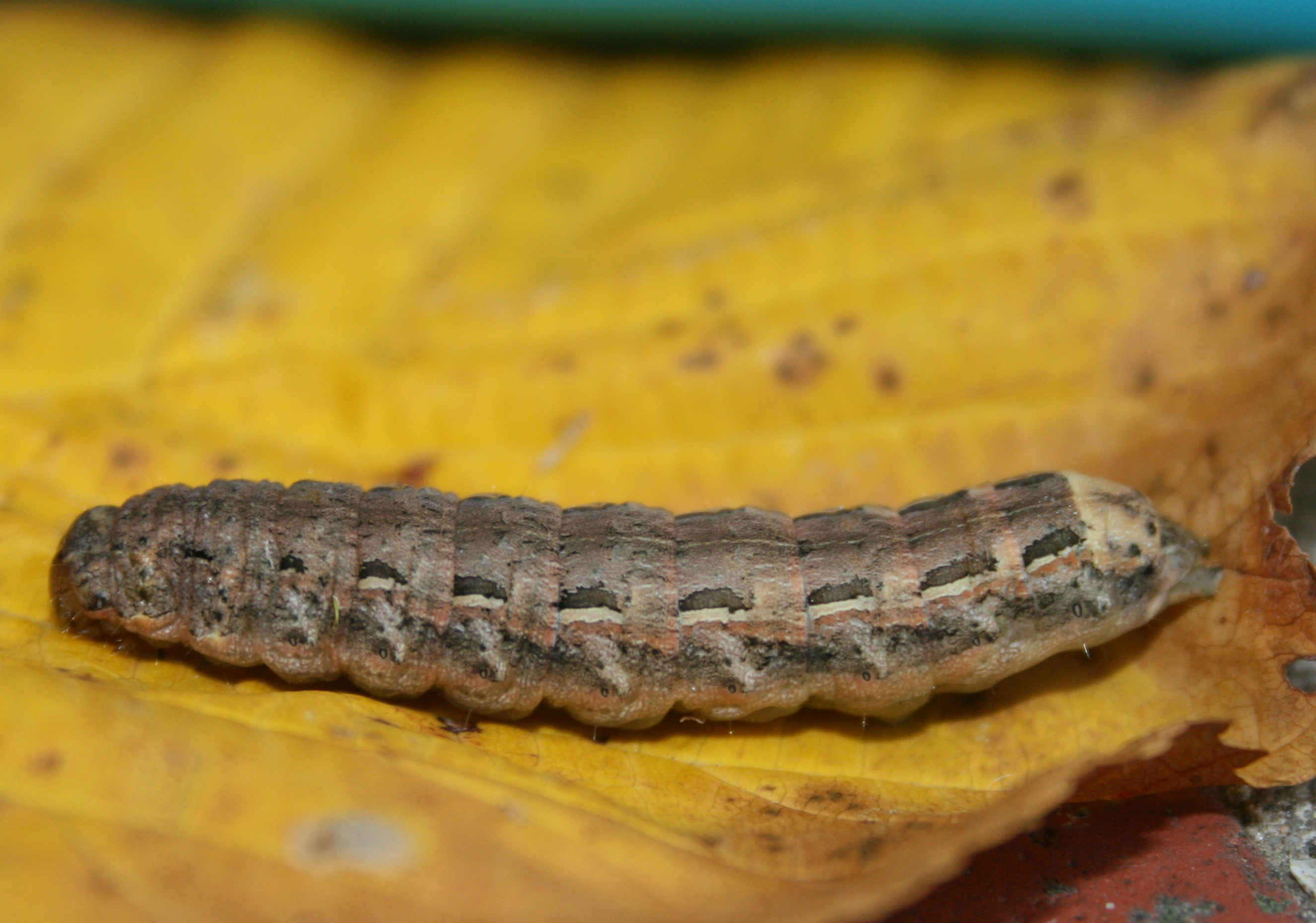
Larva

== Biology ==
The species occurs mainly in August and September, although there are records from June to October..

Larva dull reddish grey; dorsal line white, dark-edged; subdorsal line black, edged beneath with white and then a dark shade; spiracles black on a paler stripe. The larva feeds on various grasses. The species survives winter as a caterpillar.

1. The flight season refers to the British Isles. This may vary in other parts of the range.
