= Carex stolonifera =

Carex stolonifera may refer to three different species of plants:

- Carex stolonifera Ehrh., a taxonomic synonym for the spring sedge, Carex praecox
- Carex stolonifera Hoppe, a taxonomic synonym for the common sedge or black sedge, Carex nigra
- Carex stolonifera H.Lév. & VaniotEhrh., a taxonomic synonym for the species Carex oxyandra
