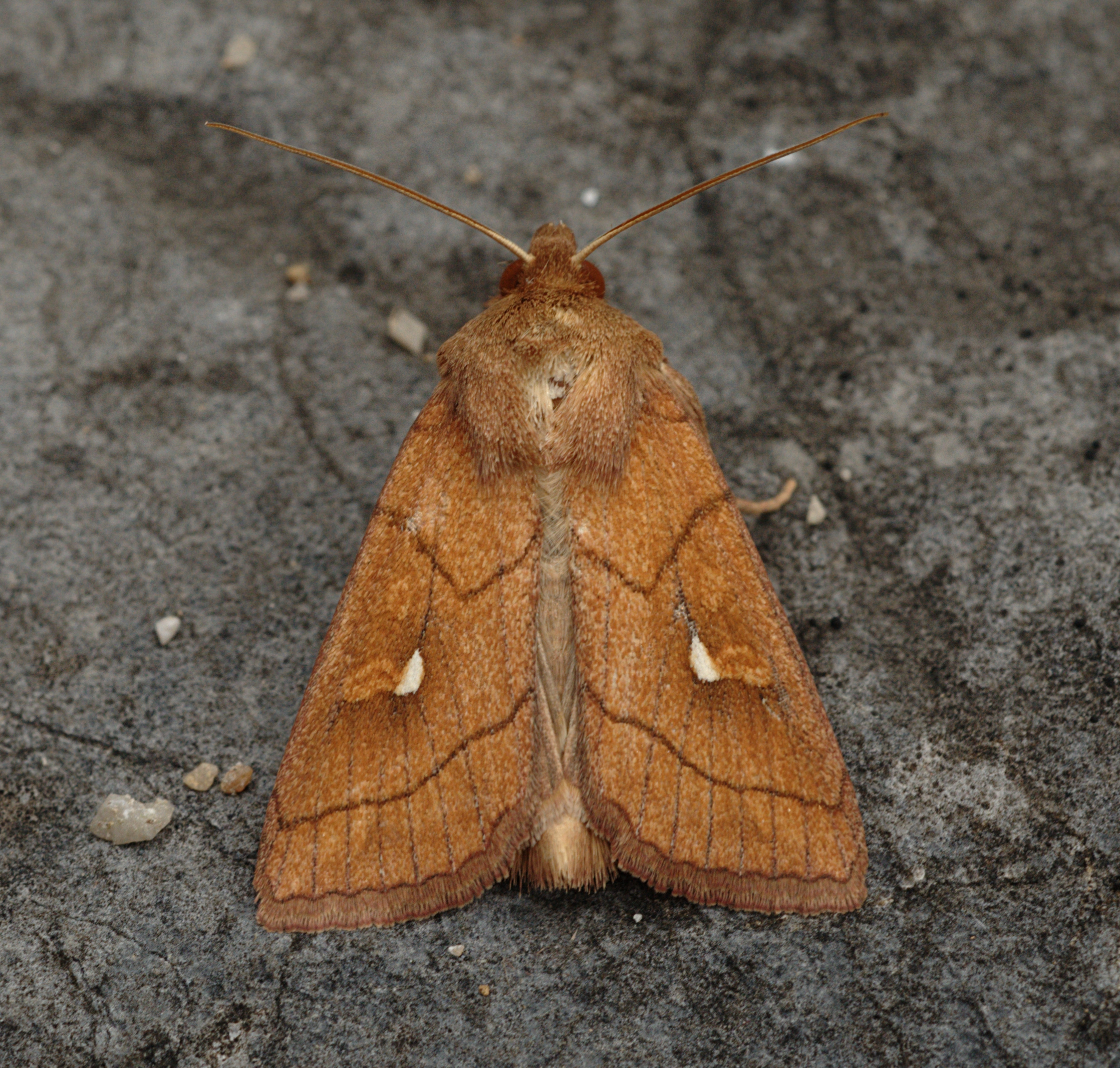
- Mythimna conigera. Dorsal view
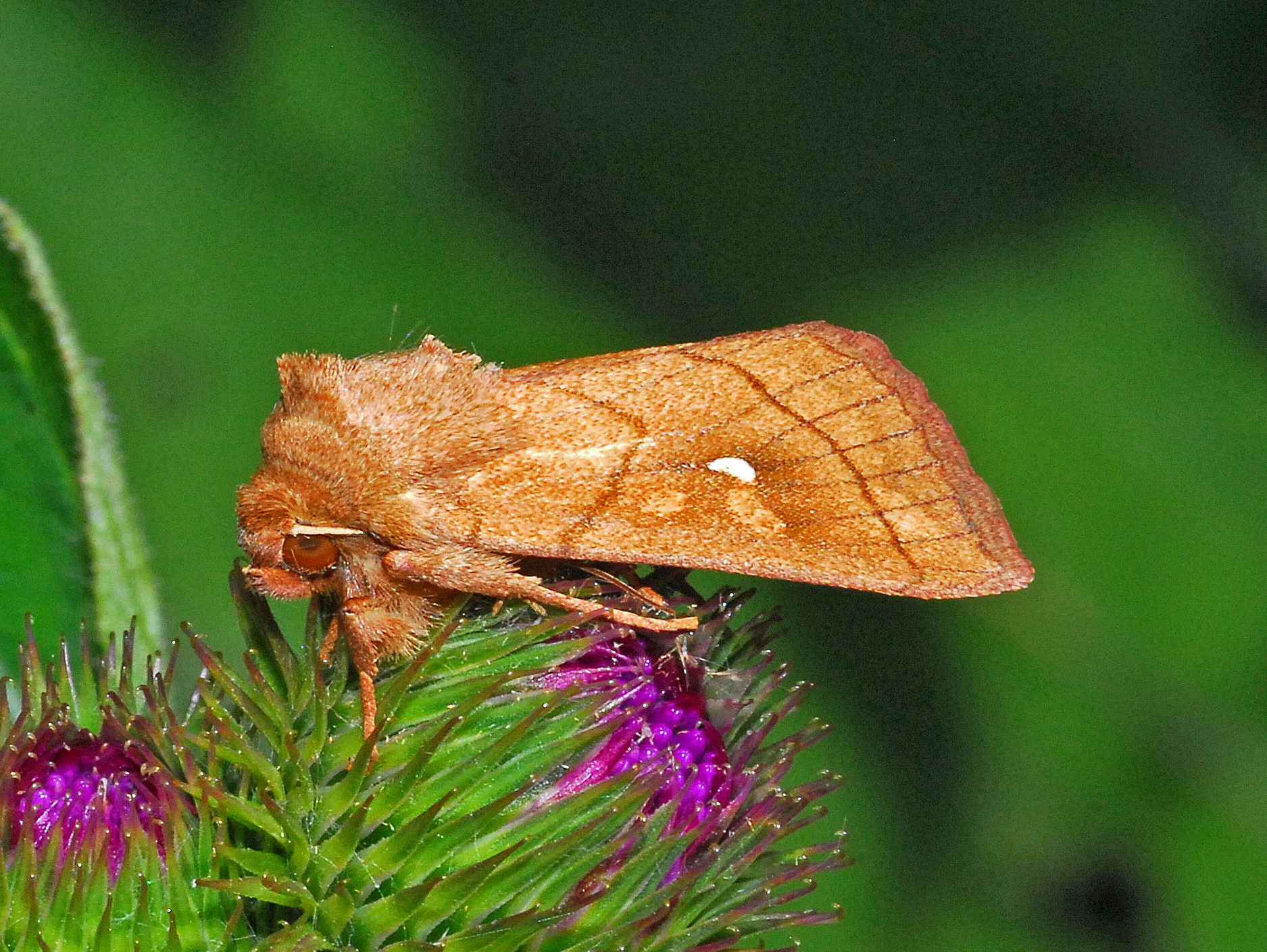
- Side view

Scientific classification
- Kingdom: Animalia
- Phylum: Arthropoda
- Clade: Pancrustacea
- Class: Insecta
- Order: Lepidoptera
- Superfamily: Noctuoidea
- Family: Noctuidae
- Genus: Mythimna
- Species: M. conigera

Binomial name
- Mythimna conigera (Denis & Schiffermüller, 1775)

Synonyms
- Phalaena (Noctua) floccida Esper, 1788

= Mythimna conigera =

Brown-line bright-eye

Species of moth

Mythimna conigera, the brown-line bright-eye, is a moth of the family Noctuidae.

== Distribution ==
This species can be found in Europe and there is a disjunct population in the Sind Valley, Kashmir named subspecies angulifera (Moore, 1881) and east across the Palearctic from Asia Minor, Armenia, Central Asia, Siberia to Japan.

== Habitat ==
These moths inhabit open habitats, wet and dry meadows, in montane and subalpine areas.

== Technical description and variation ==
The wingspan is 30–35 mm. Forewing smooth pale ochreous suffused with brown except along costa; Forewing pale fulvous suffused with darker: lines fine, brown; inner line angled on submedian fold: outer sinuate, nearly parallel to outer margin; orbicular and reniform stigmata pale, indistinct, except lower lobe of reniform, which is marked by a snowwhite spot, and is often surrounded by a grey cloud: hindwing pale rufous, darker towards termen: -suffusa Tutt is a melanic form, without any yellow tint, from North England and W. Ireland.

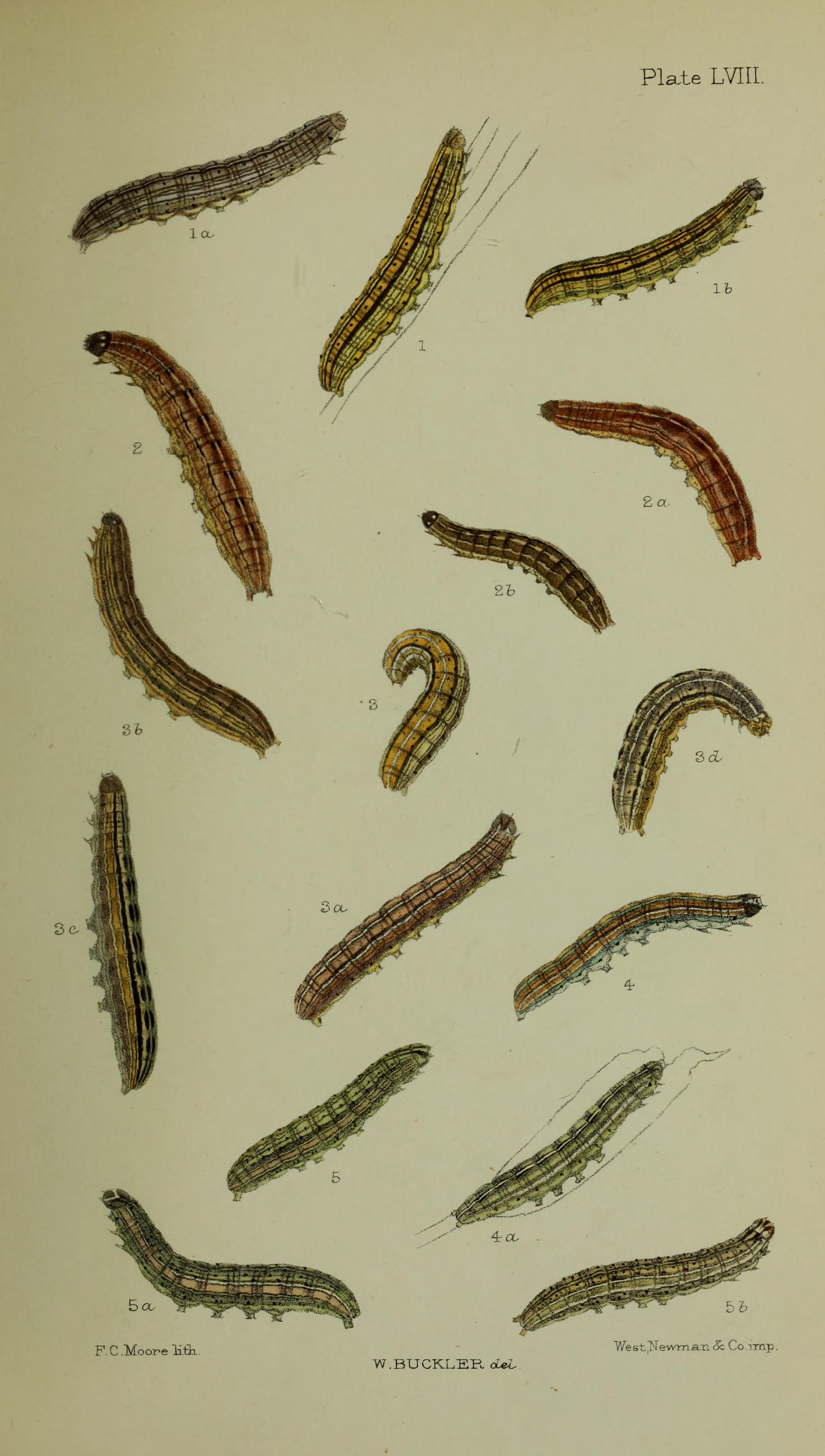
Figs 1, 1a, 1b larvae after final moult

Larva dull yellow brown; dorsal line white, with dark edges: subdorsal line black; lateral lines white flecked with red, with a broad brown stripe running beneath them and above the black spiracles. See also Hacker et al.

== Biology ==
The moth flies from June to July depending on the location. The larvae feed on various grasses, including Dactylis glomerata, Elymus repens. Phalaris arundinacea, Calamagrostis purpurea and Festuca species.
