= Hieracium caespiticola =

Scientific classification
- Kingdom: Plantae
- Clade: Tracheophytes
- Clade: Angiosperms
- Clade: Eudicots
- Clade: Asterids
- Order: Asterales
- Family: Asteraceae
- Genus: Hieracium
- Species: H. caespiticola

Binomial name
- Hieracium caespiticola Norrl.

Species of flowering plant

Hieracium caespiticola is a species of flowering plant belonging to the family Asteraceae.

Its native range is Sweden, Finland, and northwestern and northern European Russia.
