= Hieracium silenii =

Scientific classification
- Kingdom: Plantae
- Clade: Tracheophytes
- Clade: Angiosperms
- Clade: Eudicots
- Clade: Asterids
- Order: Asterales
- Family: Asteraceae
- Genus: Hieracium
- Species: H. silenii

Binomial name
- Hieracium silenii Norrl.

Species of flowering plant

Hieracium silenii is a species of flowering plant belonging to the family Asteraceae.

It is native to Finland, the Baltic states, Belarus, and northern and northwestern Russia.
