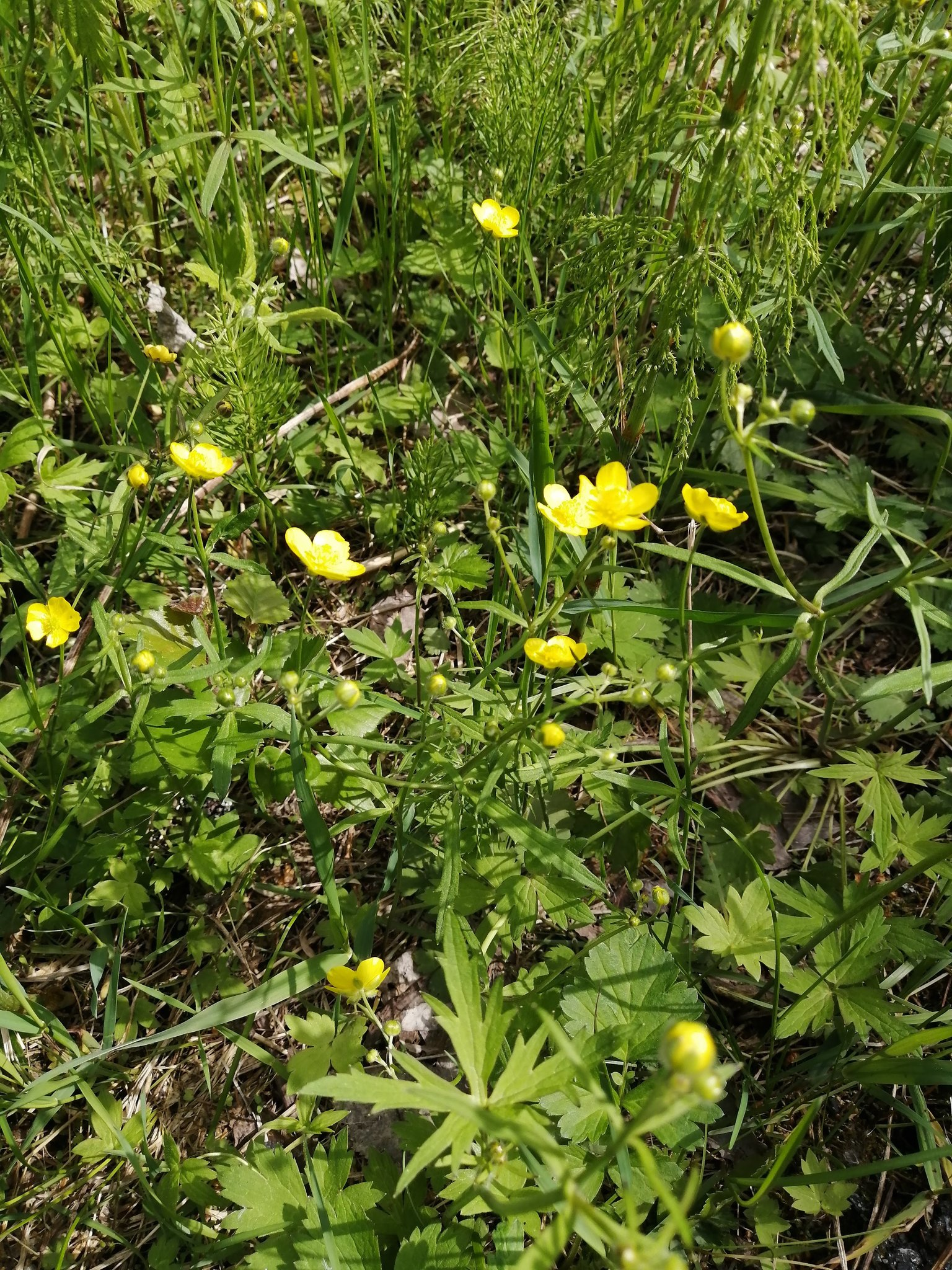

Scientific classification
- Kingdom: Plantae
- Clade: Tracheophytes
- Clade: Angiosperms
- Clade: Eudicots
- Order: Ranunculales
- Family: Ranunculaceae
- Genus: Ranunculus
- Species: R. propinquus

Binomial name
- Ranunculus propinquus C.A.Mey.

Synonyms
- Ranunculus japonicus var. propinquus (C.A.Mey.) W.T.Wang; Ranunculus lanuginosiformis Selin ex J.Fellm.; Ranunculus subborealis Tzvelev

= Ranunculus propinquus =

Species of flowering plant

Ranunculus propinquus is a species of flowering plant belonging to the family Ranunculaceae.

Its native range is eastern European Russia to Russian Far East and China.

Subspecies

- Ranunculus propinquus subsp. subborealis (Tzvelev) Kuvaev
