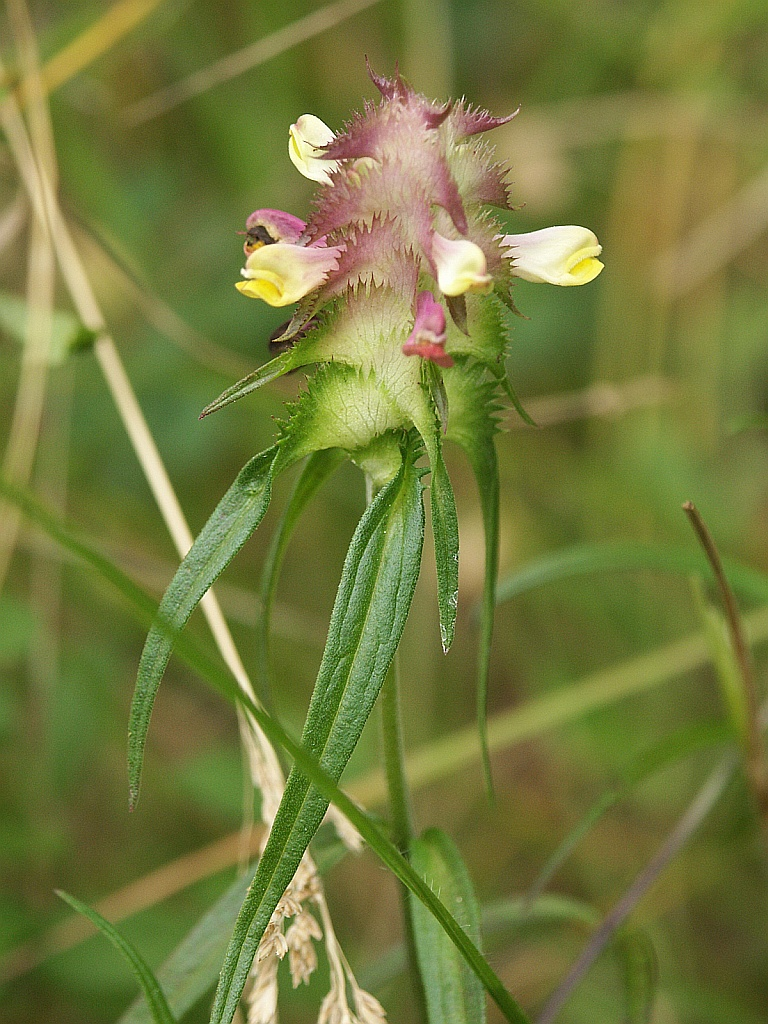

Scientific classification
- Kingdom: Plantae
- Clade: Tracheophytes
- Clade: Angiosperms
- Clade: Eudicots
- Clade: Asterids
- Order: Lamiales
- Family: Orobanchaceae
- Genus: Melampyrum
- Species: M. cristatum

Binomial name
- Melampyrum cristatum L.

= Melampyrum cristatum =

Species of flowering plant

Melampyrum cristatum, also known as crested cow-wheat is a species of flowering plant in the family Orobanchaceae.

== Description ==
M. cristatum is an annual herb species which reaches heights of 15-40cm. Stems are erect and reddish green in colour. Leaves are 5-10cm long, almost stalkless and are narrowly elliptic in shape. Flowers are tubular and purple, however the lips of the flower are yellow. M. cristatum flowers from July to August. Seeds are produced inside 10mm long, flat capsules. Seeds possess soft, oily, elaiosomes, which are collected, eaten and distributed by ants.

== Distribution ==
M. cristatum is native to the following places: Albania, Altai, Austria, the Baltic States, Belarus, Belgium, Bulgaria, Corsica, Crete, Czech Republic, Denmark, Finland, France, Germany, Great Britain, Hungary, Italy, Kazakhstan, North Caucasus, Norway, Poland, Romania, Russia, Siberia (western), Slovakia, Spain, Sweden, Switzerland, Turkey (European), Ukraine, Yugoslavia.

It has also been introduced outside of its natural range into Krasnoyarsk.

== Habitat ==
This species is associated with woodland habitats, where it grows in clearings, margins and on river banks. M. cristatum will also grow in manmade habitats such as hedgerows and roadsides. It benefits from managed woodland habitats where coppicing is still practiced. M. cristatum is also sometimes found in grassland habitats such as rocky hillside meadows.

M. cristatum is a calcicole, which thrives in lime rich soils. It can be found growing in both chalky and clay soils.

== Ecology ==
Melampyrum cristatum like all Melampyrum species is a parasite. They are able to obtains nutrients from other host plant species. Despite the ability to steal nutrients from others, M. cristatum has retained its ability to photosynthesize making it a hemiparasite.

Seeds of M. cristatum possess soft, oily, elaiosomes, which are collected and eaten by wood ants (Formica). This relationship is known as mutualistic between both organisms as the ants obtain a food source, whilst seeds are distributed enabling M. cristatum it to colonize new habitats.
