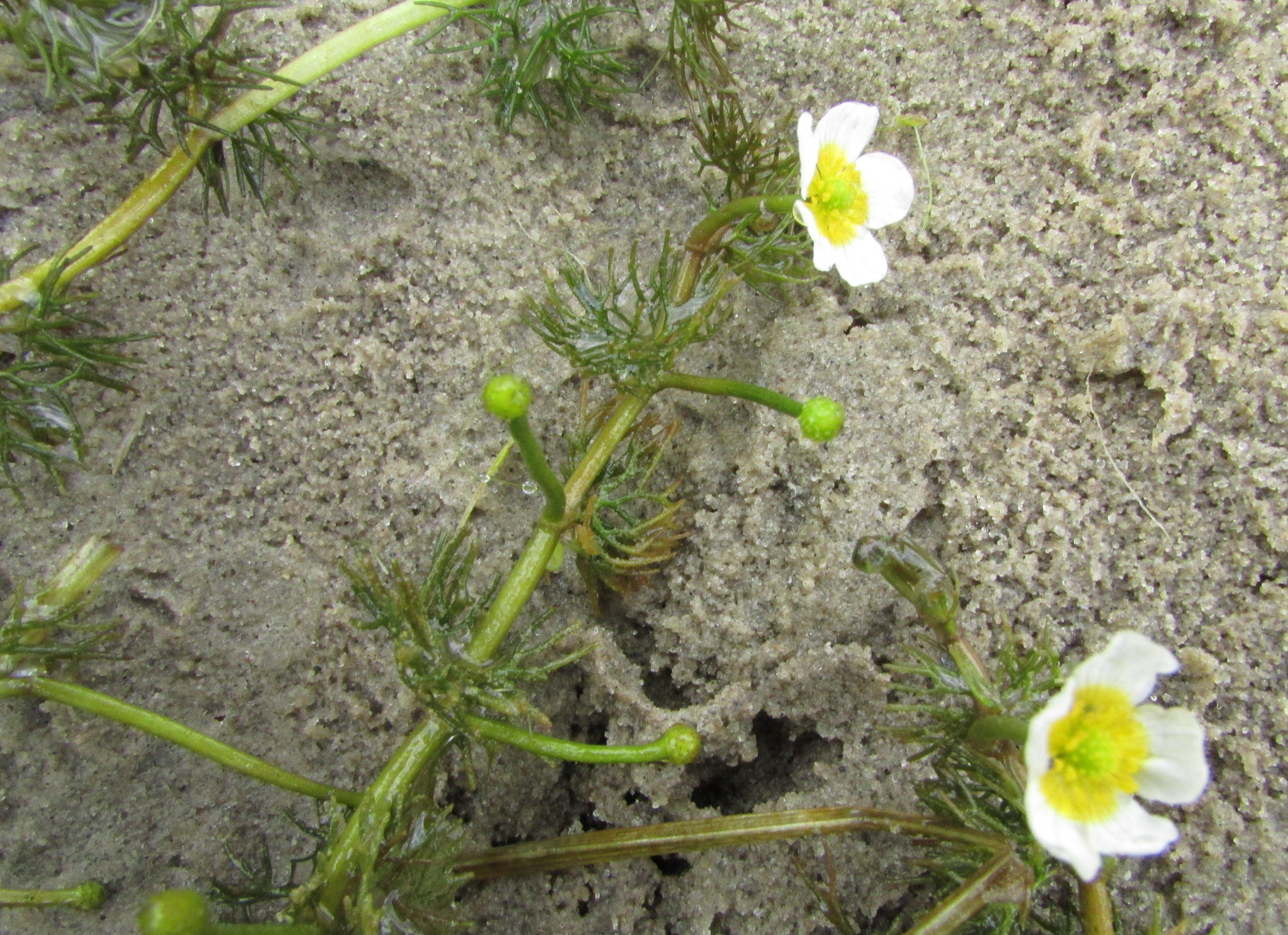

Scientific classification
- Kingdom: Plantae
- Clade: Tracheophytes
- Clade: Angiosperms
- Clade: Eudicots
- Order: Ranunculales
- Family: Ranunculaceae
- Genus: Ranunculus
- Species: R. kauffmannii

Binomial name
- Ranunculus kauffmannii Clerc

Synonyms
- Batrachium kauffmannii (Clerc) Krecz.; Ranunculus pseudoflaccidus Petunn.

= Ranunculus kauffmannii =

Species of flowering plant

Ranunculus kauffmannii is a species of flowering plant belonging to the family Ranunculaceae.

Its native range is Eastern Europe to Japan.

It is a herbaceous perennial growing to tall by wide, with glossy green leaves and clusters of white, pink, or red flowers in late spring and early summer.

Ranunculus kauffmannii is grown as an ornamental plant in gardens and parks.
