= Hieracium penduliforme =

Scientific classification
- Kingdom: Plantae
- Clade: Tracheophytes
- Clade: Angiosperms
- Clade: Eudicots
- Clade: Asterids
- Order: Asterales
- Family: Asteraceae
- Genus: Hieracium
- Species: H. penduliforme

Binomial name
- Hieracium penduliforme (Dahlst.) Johanss.

Species of flowering plant

Hieracium penduliforme is a species of flowering plant belonging to the family Asteraceae.

Its native range is Northern Europe.
