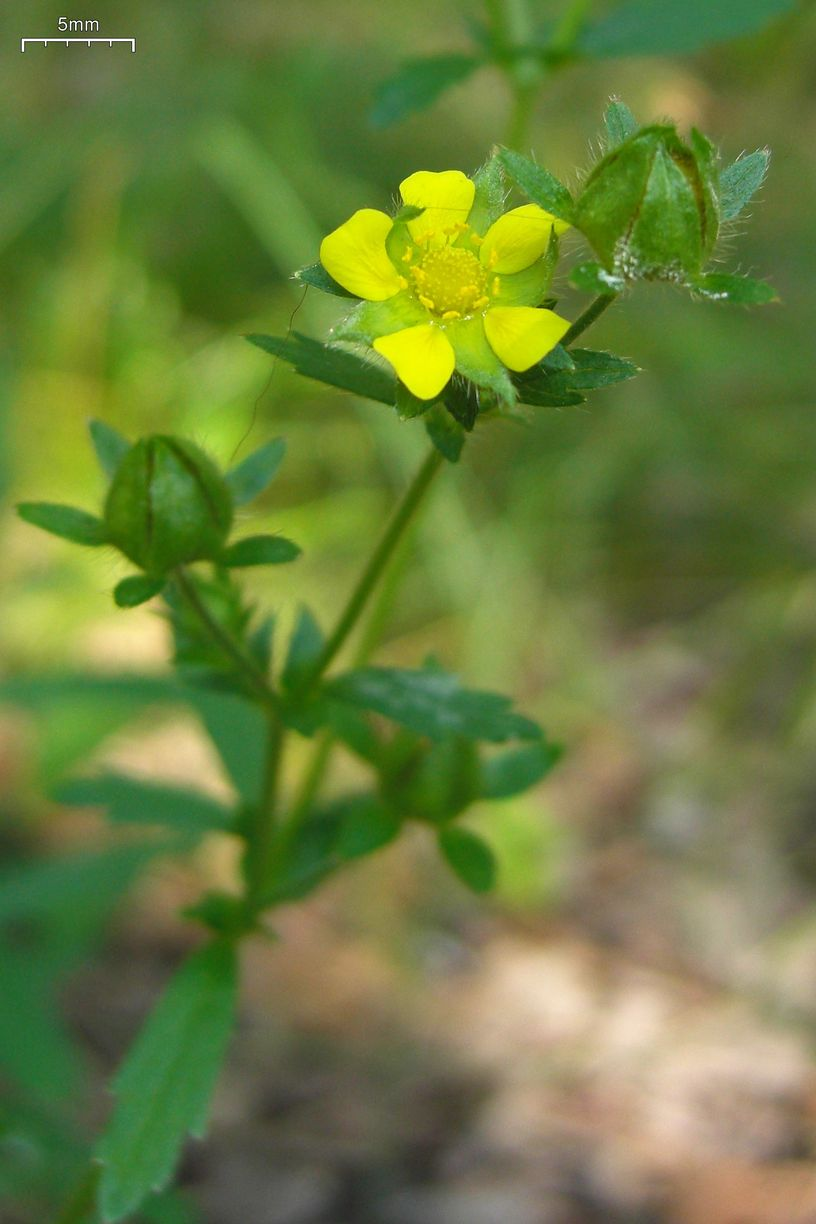

Conservation status
- Secure (NatureServe)

Scientific classification
- Kingdom: Plantae
- Clade: Tracheophytes
- Clade: Angiosperms
- Clade: Eudicots
- Clade: Rosids
- Order: Rosales
- Family: Rosaceae
- Genus: Potentilla
- Species: P. norvegica

Binomial name
- Potentilla norvegica L.

Subspecies
- P. norvegica subsp. monspeliensis; P. norvegica subsp. norvegica

Synonyms
- Potentilla ruthenica Willd.

= Potentilla norvegica =

Species of flowering plant

Potentilla norvegica is a species of cinquefoil known by the common names rough cinquefoil, ternate-leaved cinquefoil, and Norwegian cinquefoil. It is native to Europe, Asia, and parts of North America, and it can be found elsewhere as an introduced species.

== Description ==
Norwegian cinquefoil is usually an annual but may be a short-lived perennial. It produces a basal rosette of leaves from a taproot, then a green or red stem growing erect up to about 50 cm (20 in) in maximum length, and branching in its upper parts. The leaves are stalked and are either divided into five leaflets, or have three leaflets with the terminal leaflet being divided into three lobes. The basal leaves have narrow, sharp-tipped stipules while the upper leaves have elliptical stipules which are longer than the leaf stalks. Each leaflet is up to 5 cm (2 in) long and is widely lance-shaped with toothed edges. The inflorescence is a cyme of several flowers. Each flower has five rounded yellow petals no more than 4 mm (0.2 in) long inside a calyx of hairy, pointed sepals with reddish tips. There are twenty stamens, a separate gynoecium and many pistils. The calyx lengthens after flowering and the fruit is a cluster of pale brown achenes.

== Distribution and habitat ==
Norwegian cinquefoil is native to much of Europe, Asia, and parts of North America, and it can be found in other parts of the world as an introduced species. Its natural habitat is arable fields, gardens, banks, hedgerows, wasteland, logging clearings, loading areas and occasionally shores, often on sandy or gravelly soils.
