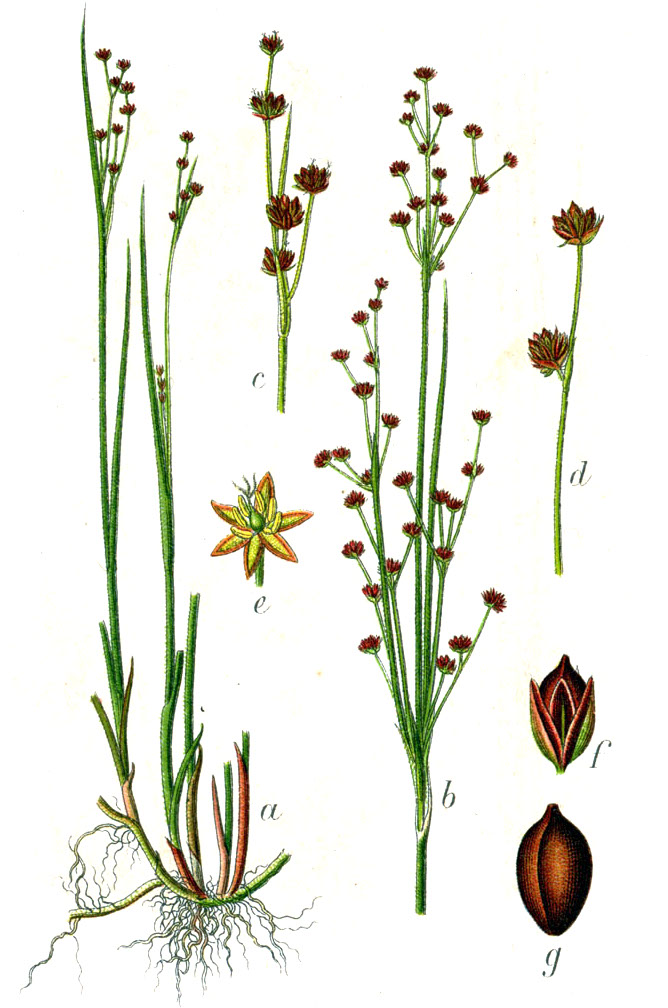
- Botanical illustration

Scientific classification
- Kingdom: Plantae
- Clade: Embryophytes
- Clade: Tracheophytes
- Clade: Spermatophytes
- Clade: Angiosperms
- Clade: Monocots
- Clade: Commelinids
- Order: Poales
- Family: Juncaceae
- Genus: Juncus
- Species: J. alpinoarticulatus

Binomial name
- Juncus alpinoarticulatus Chaix

Synonyms
- List: Juncus affinis R.Br.; Juncus alpestris Hartm.; Juncus alpinoarticulatus var. marshallii (Pugsley) P.D.Sell; Juncus alpinoarticulatus subsp. nodulosus (Wahlenb.) Hämet-Ahti; Juncus alpinus var. americanus Farw.; Juncus alpinus subsp. australis Hyl.; Juncus alpinus var. fuscescens Fernald; Juncus alpinus f. obtusatus (Hartm.) Lindq.; Juncus carpaticus Simonk.; Juncus fischerianus Turcz. ex V.I.Krecz.; Juncus fuscoater Schreb.; Juncus marshallii Pugsley; Juncus mucroniflorus Clairv.; Juncus nodulosus Wahlenb.; Juncus rariflorus Hartm.; Juncus rariflorus var. obtusatus Hartm.; Juncus richardsonianus Schult. & Schult.f.; Juncus sosnowskyi Novikov; Juncus ustulatus Hoppe

= Juncus alpinoarticulatus =

Species of flowering plant

Juncus alpinoarticulatus, called the northern green rush and the alpine rush, is a species of flowering plant in the genus Juncus, with a circumboreal distribution. It prefers wet sandy soils, peat bogs, acidic fens, and ditches.

== Subtaxa ==
The following subspecies are currently accepted:

- Juncus alpinoarticulatus subsp. alpestris (Hartm.) Hämet-Ahti – northern Europe, Iceland
- Juncus alpinoarticulatus subsp. alpinoarticulatus – Europe, Morocco, Caucasus
- Juncus alpinoarticulatus subsp. americanus (Farw.) Hämet-Ahti – Greenland, North America, Russian Far East
- Juncus alpinoarticulatus subsp. fischerianus (Turcz. ex V.I.Krecz.) Hämet-Ahti –Asia, northeastern Europe
- Juncus alpinoarticulatus subsp. fuscescens (Fernald) Hämet-Ahti – central US
- Juncus alpinoarticulatus subsp. rariflorus (Hartm.) Holub – northern Europe to western Siberia
