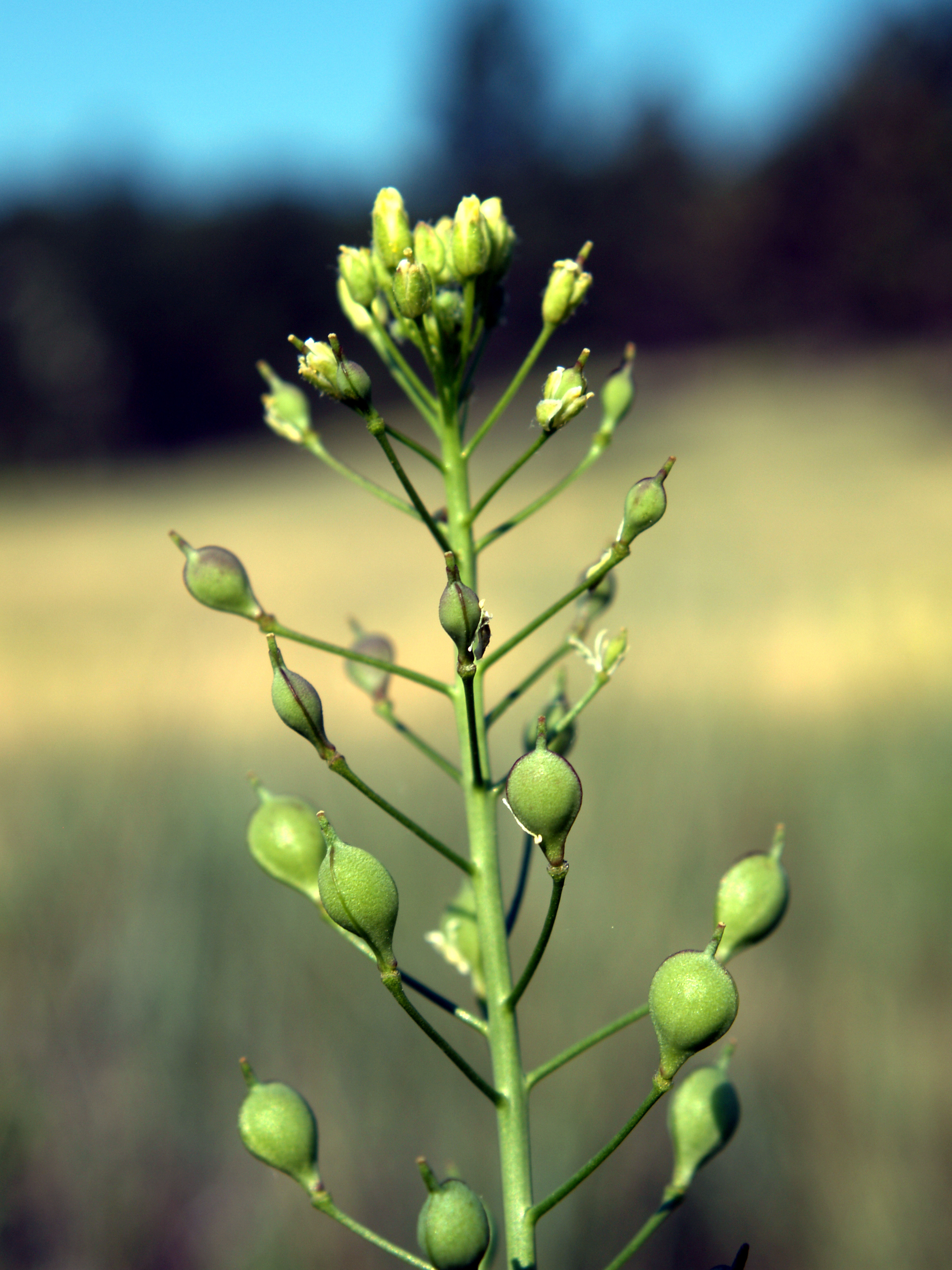

Scientific classification
- Kingdom: Plantae
- Clade: Tracheophytes
- Clade: Angiosperms
- Clade: Eudicots
- Clade: Rosids
- Order: Brassicales
- Family: Brassicaceae
- Genus: Camelina
- Species: C. microcarpa

Binomial name
- Camelina microcarpa Andrz. ex DC.

Synonyms
- Camelina sylvestris Wallr.

= Camelina microcarpa =

Species of flowering plant

Camelina microcarpa is a species of flowering plant in the mustard family known by several common names, including littlepod false flax lesser gold-of-pleasure and small seed false flax. It is native to Europe and Asia, and it is common across the globe as an introduced species and sometimes a noxious weed. It is known as a weed of grain crops such as wheat and rye. This is an erect annual herb producing a branched or unbranched stem 30 centimeters to one meter in height. It is sometimes coated thinly in hairs, particularly on the lower part. The leaves are lance-shaped to oblong. The upper part of the stem is occupied by an inflorescence of many pale yellow flowers. They yield plump oblong to rounded fruits, each under a centimeter long and held at the tip of a short pedicel.
