= Hieracium subpellucidum =

Scientific classification
- Kingdom: Plantae
- Clade: Tracheophytes
- Clade: Angiosperms
- Clade: Eudicots
- Clade: Asterids
- Order: Asterales
- Family: Asteraceae
- Genus: Hieracium
- Species: H. subpellucidum

Binomial name
- Hieracium subpellucidum (Norrl.) Norrl.

Species of flowering plant

Hieracium subpellucidum is a species of flowering plant belonging to the family Asteraceae.

Synonyms:

- Hieracium arcuatidens (Zahn) Üksip
- Hieracium diaphanoides subsp. subpellucidum (Norrl.) Zahn
- Hieracium uranopoleos Üksip
- Hieracium vulgatum subsp. arcuatidens Zahn
