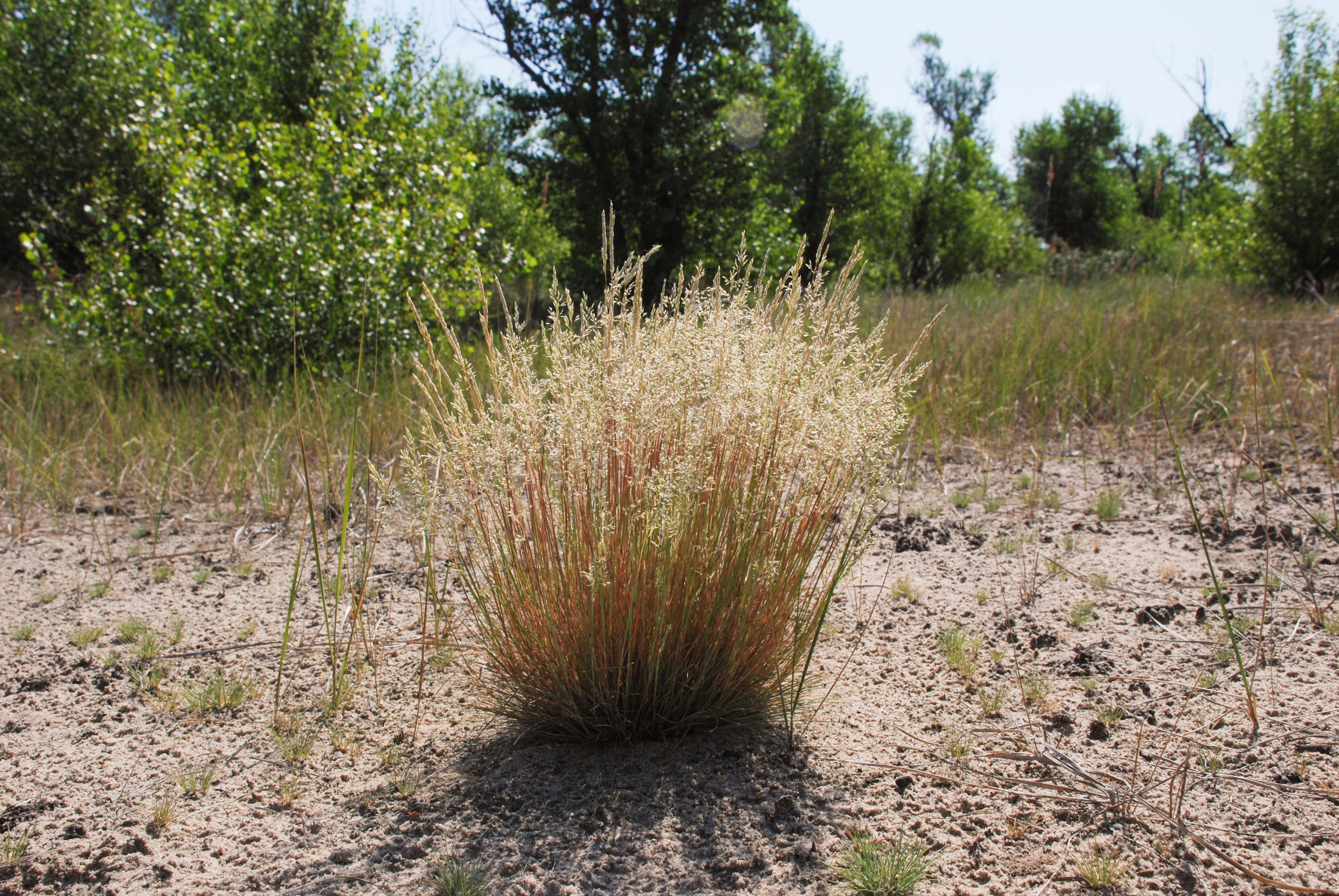

Scientific classification
- Kingdom: Plantae
- Clade: Tracheophytes
- Clade: Angiosperms
- Clade: Monocots
- Clade: Commelinids
- Order: Poales
- Family: Poaceae
- Subfamily: Pooideae
- Genus: Festuca
- Species: F. beckeri

Binomial name
- Festuca beckeri (Hack.) Trautv.

Synonyms
- List: Festuca ovina subsp. beckeri Hack.; Festuca beckeri var. baicalensis Vylzan; Festuca beckeri subsp. laeviuscula (Klokov) Tzvelev; Festuca beckeri subsp. polesica (Zapał.) Tzvelev; Festuca beckeri subsp. sabulosa (Andersson) Tzvelev; Festuca laeviuscula Klokov; Festuca ovina subvar. litoralis Brenner; Festuca ovina var. sabulosa Andersson; Festuca polesica Zapał.; Festuca polesica f. denudata Holmb.; Festuca quercetopinetorum Klokov; Festuca sabulosa (Andersson) H.Lindb.

= Festuca beckeri =

Species of grass

Festuca beckeri is a species of grass which can be found in Central and Western Asia, and also in Europe.

== Description ==
The plant is perennial and caespitose with erect culms that are 20–60 centimetres (7.9–23.6 in) long. They are also clumped and have light brown coloured butt sheaths. The ligule is going around the eciliate membrane with the leaf sheaths being open and hairy. Leaf-blades are filiform, conduplicate, light green in colour, and are 0.3–0.7 centimetres (0.12–0.28 in) broad. They also have smooth surface and peduncle. The panicle is linear, open, inflorescenced and is 6–14 centimetres (2.4–5.5 in) long.

Spikelets are elliptic and solitary with pedicelled fertile spikelets that carry 4-6 fertile florets. The main panicle branches are hairy. The glumes are chartaceous, lanceolate, and keelless. They also have acute apexes, while only the upper glume is sized 2.9–4 millimetres (0.11–0.16 in). Fertile lemma is 2.5–4.7 millimetres (0.098–0.185 in) long and is also chartaceous, lanceolate, keelless, and are of the same colour as leaf blades. The main lemma have an acuminate apex and carries one awn that is 0.3–0.8 millimetres (0.012–0.031 in) long. Flowers have three stamens while the fruits are caryopses with an additional pericarp and linear hilum.
