= Erysimum canescens =

Scientific classification
- Kingdom: Plantae
- Clade: Tracheophytes
- Clade: Angiosperms
- Clade: Eudicots
- Clade: Rosids
- Order: Brassicales
- Family: Brassicaceae
- Genus: Erysimum
- Species: E. canescens

Binomial name
- Erysimum canescens Roth

Species of flowering plant

Erysimum canescens is a species of flowering plant belonging to the family Brassicaceae.

Synonym:

- Erysimum platyphyllum Schur
- Erysimum rigens Jord.
- Erysimum ruscinonense Jord.
