= Hieracium crispulum =

Scientific classification
- Kingdom: Plantae
- Clade: Tracheophytes
- Clade: Angiosperms
- Clade: Eudicots
- Clade: Asterids
- Order: Asterales
- Family: Asteraceae
- Genus: Hieracium
- Species: H. crispulum

Binomial name
- Hieracium crispulum Norrl.

Synonyms
- Hieracium bifidum subsp. crispans (H.Lindb.) Zahn; Hieracium crispans (H.Lindb.) Norrl; Hieracium subcaesium subsp. crispans H.Lindb.

Species of flowering plant

Hieracium crispulum is a species of flowering plant belonging to the family Asteraceae. It is native to Finland and northwestern and northern Russia.
