= Puccinellia hauptiana =

Scientific classification
- Kingdom: Plantae
- Clade: Tracheophytes
- Clade: Angiosperms
- Clade: Monocots
- Clade: Commelinids
- Order: Poales
- Family: Poaceae
- Subfamily: Pooideae
- Genus: Puccinellia
- Species: P. hauptiana

Binomial name
- Puccinellia hauptiana (V.I.Krecz.) Kitag.

Species of grass

Puccinellia hauptiana is a species of flowering plant belonging to the family Poaceae.

Its native range is Eastern Europe to Korea, Alaska.
