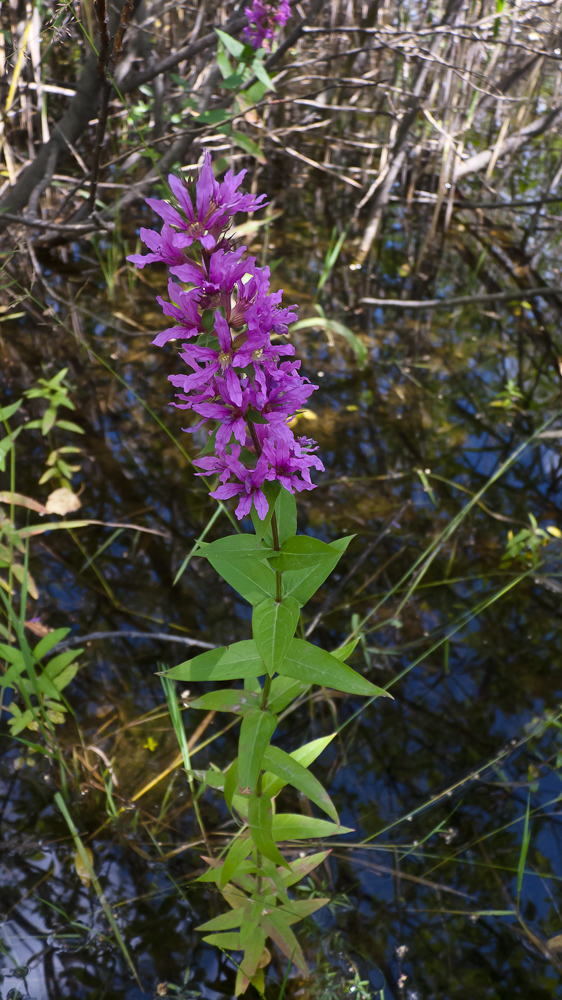

Scientific classification
- Kingdom: Plantae
- Clade: Tracheophytes
- Clade: Angiosperms
- Clade: Eudicots
- Clade: Rosids
- Order: Myrtales
- Family: Lythraceae
- Genus: Lythrum
- Species: L. intermedium

Binomial name
- Lythrum intermedium Fisch. ex Colla

= Lythrum intermedium =

Species of flowering plant

Lythrum intermedium is a species of flowering plant belonging to the family Lythraceae.

Its native range is Temperate Asia.
