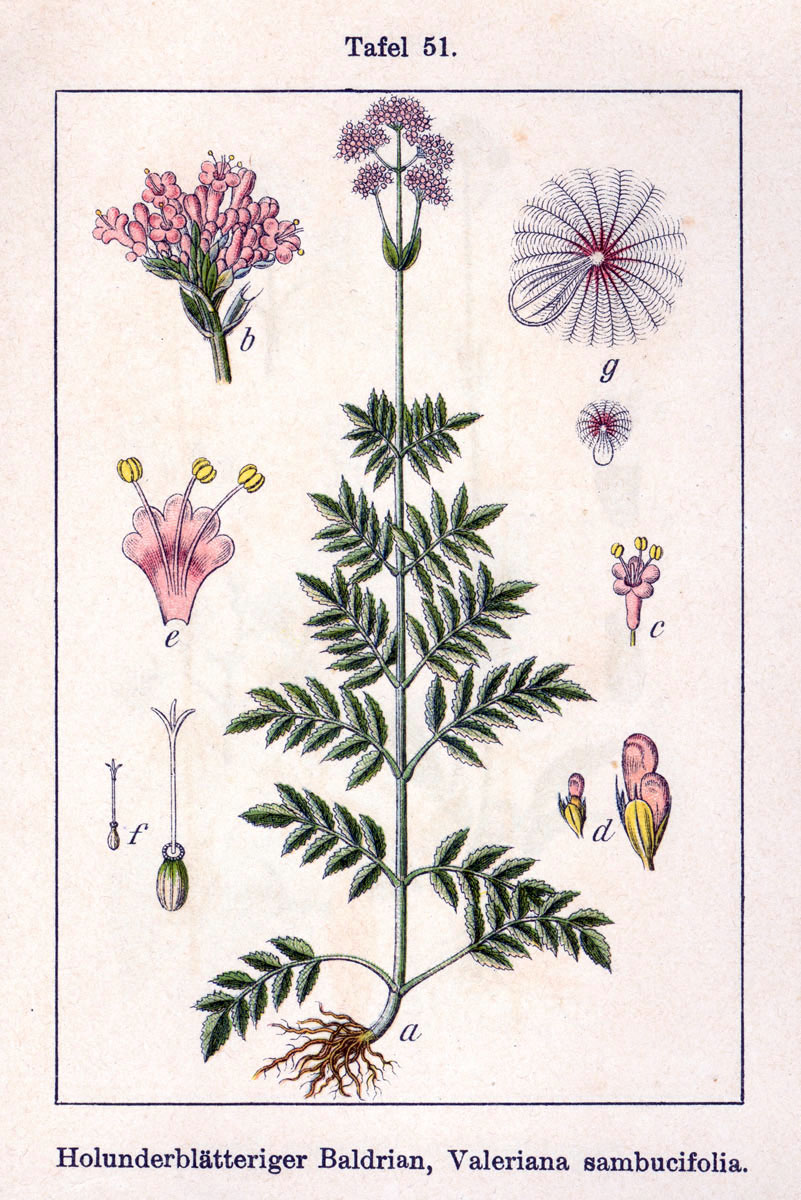

Scientific classification
- Kingdom: Plantae
- Clade: Tracheophytes
- Clade: Angiosperms
- Clade: Eudicots
- Clade: Asterids
- Order: Dipsacales
- Family: Caprifoliaceae
- Genus: Valeriana
- Species: V. sambucifolia

Binomial name
- Valeriana sambucifolia Mikan f.

= Valeriana sambucifolia =

Species of flowering plant

Valeriana sambucifolia is a species of flowering plant belonging to the family Caprifoliaceae.

Synonyms:

- Valeriana murmanica Orlova
- Valeriana officinalis var. nitida
- Valeriana pleijelii Kreyer
- Valeriana procurrens subsp. salina Á.Löve & D.Löve

Subspecies:

- Valeriana sambucifolia subsp. salina (synonym Valeriana salina Pleijel)
