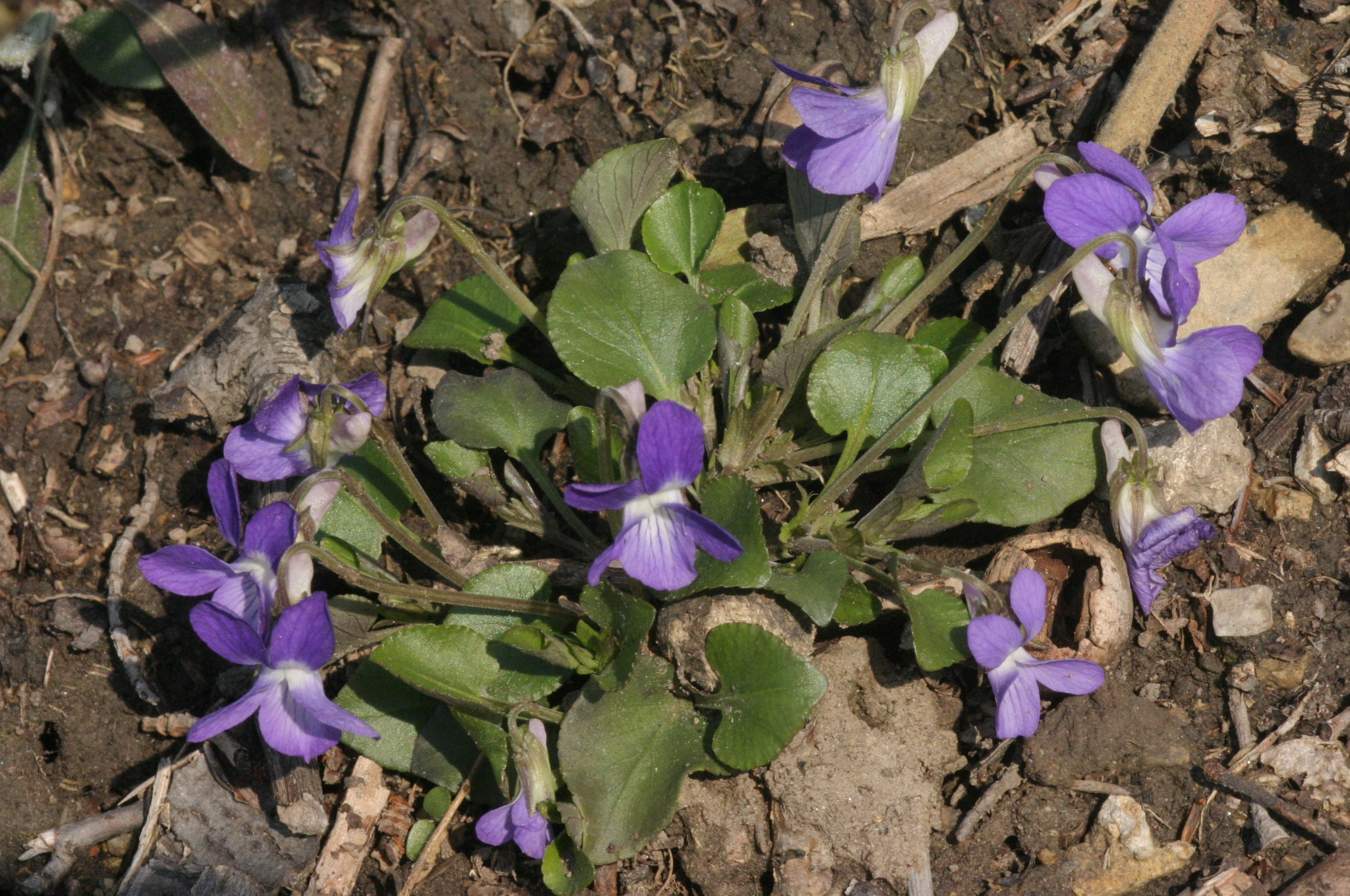

Scientific classification
- Kingdom: Plantae
- Clade: Tracheophytes
- Clade: Angiosperms
- Clade: Eudicots
- Clade: Rosids
- Order: Malpighiales
- Family: Violaceae
- Genus: Viola
- Species: V. rupestris

Binomial name
- Viola rupestris F.W.Schmidt

= Viola rupestris =

Species of flowering plant

Viola rupestris is a species of flowering plant belonging to the family Violaceae.

It is native to Temperate Eurasia.
