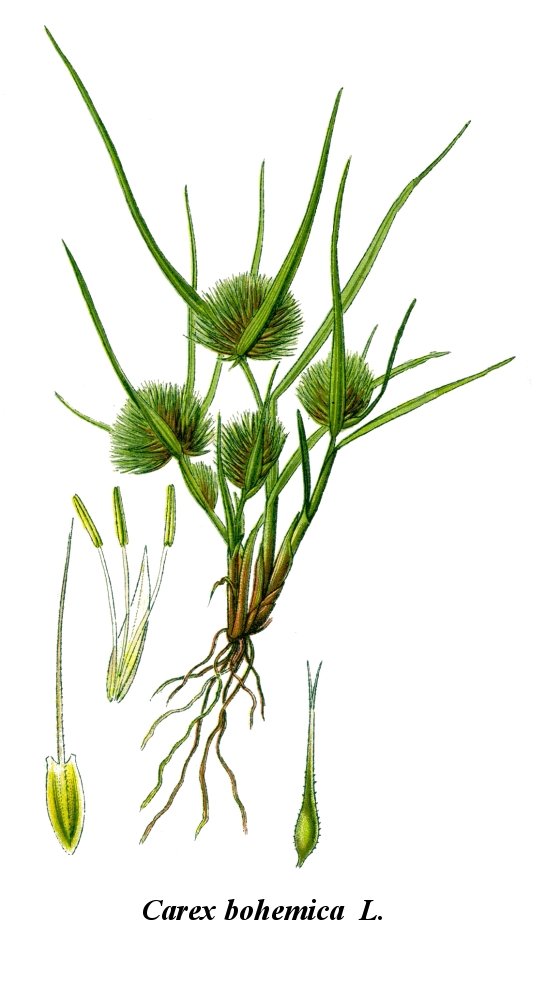
- Botanical illustration
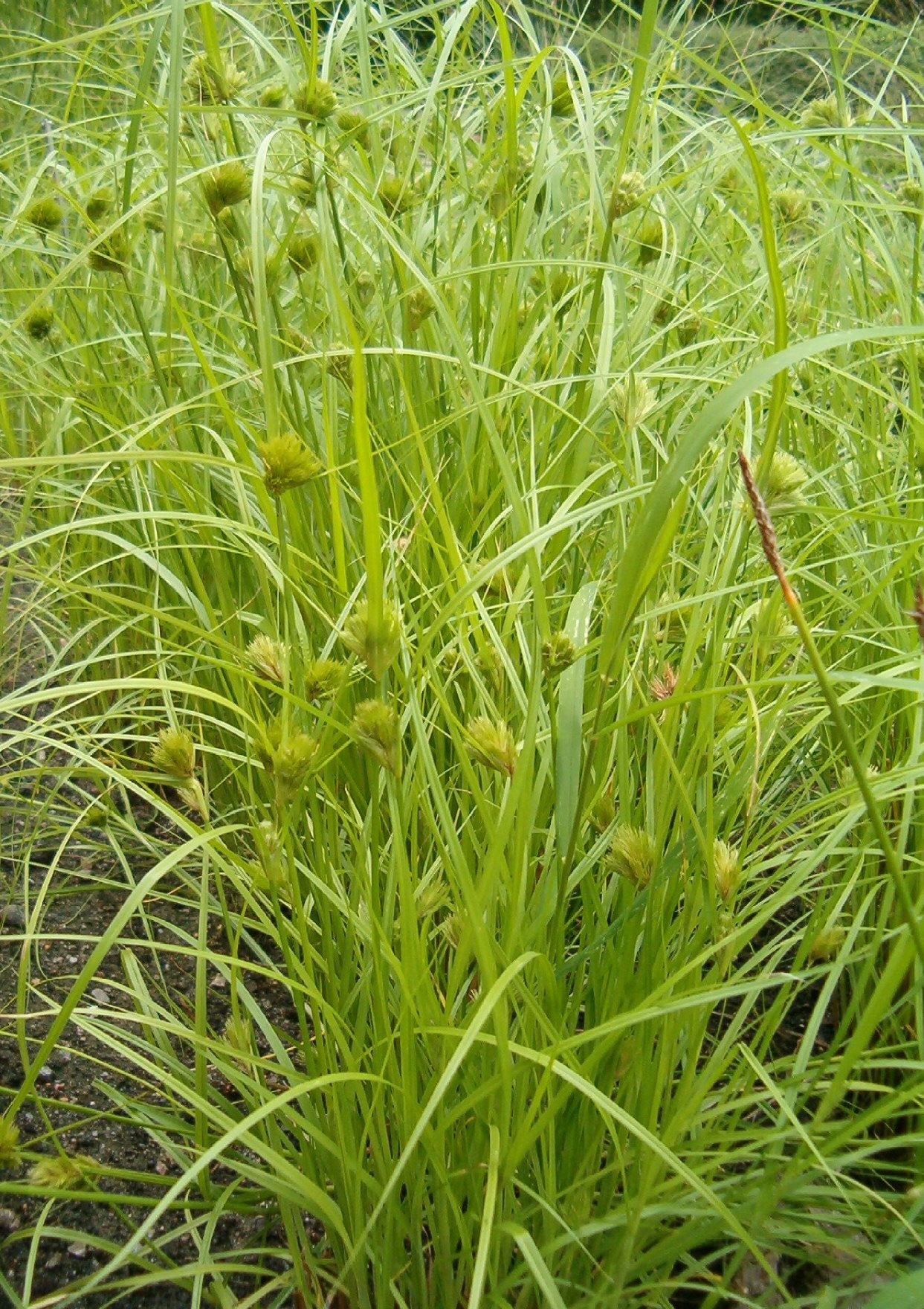
- Habitus

Scientific classification
- Kingdom: Plantae
- Clade: Tracheophytes
- Clade: Angiosperms
- Clade: Monocots
- Clade: Commelinids
- Order: Poales
- Family: Cyperaceae
- Genus: Carex
- Species: C. bohemica

Binomial name
- Carex bohemica Schreb.

Synonyms
- List: Carex bohemica f. aggregata (Domin) Soó; Carex cyperoidea Houtt.; Carex cyperoides L.; Caricina cyperoides (L.) St.-Lag.; Schelhammeria capitata Moench; Schelhammeria cyperoides (L.) Dumort.; Thysanocarex cyperoides (L.) Fedde & J.Schust.; Vignea bohemica (Schreb.) Soják; Vignea cyperoides (L.) Peterm.

= Carex bohemica =

Species of grass-like plant

Carex bohemica is a species of sedge (genus Carex), native to Europe, Siberia, and northern Asia to Japan, and it was introduced to Sweden. It prefers to grow in mud flats. It is called Zypergras-Segge in German.

== Description ==
The sedge can reach heights of 25 to 40 centimeters long. It has simple, alternate leaves. The leaves are also linear, entire, and have parallel venation. It has flowers arranged in spikes that bloom from June to September. The sedge produces nuts.
