= Ranunculus schmalhausenii =

Scientific classification
- Kingdom: Plantae
- Clade: Tracheophytes
- Clade: Angiosperms
- Clade: Eudicots
- Order: Ranunculales
- Family: Ranunculaceae
- Genus: Ranunculus
- Species: R. schmalhausenii

Binomial name
- Ranunculus schmalhausenii Luferov

Species of flowering plant

Ranunculus schmalhausenii is a species of flowering plant belonging to the family Ranunculaceae.

Its native range is Northern and Northeastern Europe.

Synonyms:

- Batrachium dichotomum (Schmalh.) Trautv.
- Batrachium nevense Tzvelev
- Ranunculus dichotomus (Schmalh.) N.I.Orlova
- Ranunculus nevensis (Tzvelev) Luferov
