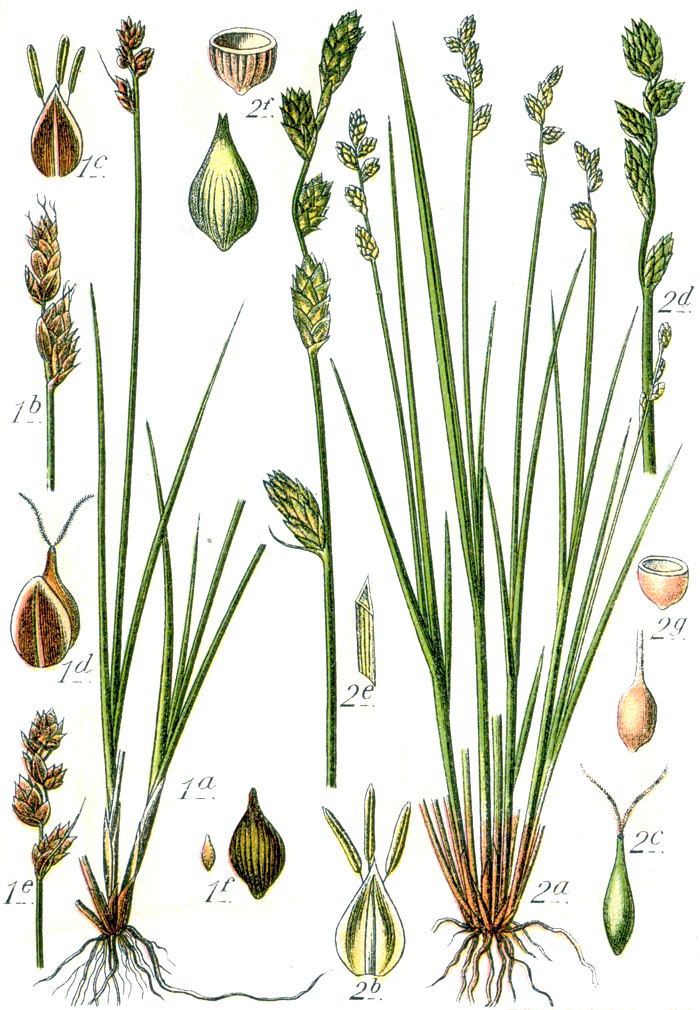
- 1 (left) = Carex heleonastes

Scientific classification
- Kingdom: Plantae
- Clade: Tracheophytes
- Clade: Angiosperms
- Clade: Monocots
- Clade: Commelinids
- Order: Poales
- Family: Cyperaceae
- Genus: Carex
- Species: C. heleonastes

Binomial name
- Carex heleonastes Ehrh. ex L.f.

= Carex heleonastes =

Species of grass-like plant

Carex heleonastes is a species of flowering plant belonging to the family Cyperaceae.

Its native range is Europe to Russian Far East, Canada.
