= Hieracium prolatatum =

Scientific classification
- Kingdom: Plantae
- Clade: Tracheophytes
- Clade: Angiosperms
- Clade: Eudicots
- Clade: Asterids
- Order: Asterales
- Family: Asteraceae
- Genus: Hieracium
- Species: H. prolatatum

Binomial name
- Hieracium prolatatum Johanss.

Synonyms
- Hieracium subramosum subsp. prolatatum (Johanss.) Zahn; Hieracium subramosum subsp. submeridionale Zahn

Species of flowering plant

Hieracium prolatatum is a species of flowering plant belonging to the family Asteraceae. It is found in Sweden and northwestern and northern Russia.
