= Hieracium lepistoides =

Scientific classification
- Kingdom: Plantae
- Clade: Tracheophytes
- Clade: Angiosperms
- Clade: Eudicots
- Clade: Asterids
- Order: Asterales
- Family: Asteraceae
- Genus: Hieracium
- Species: H. lepistoides

Binomial name
- Hieracium lepistoides (Dahlst.) Norrl.

Species of flowering plant

Hieracium lepistoides is a species of flowering plant belonging to the family Asteraceae. It is found in Europe, including Finland, Central Europe, and parts of Russia. Its preferred habitat includes shady sparse spruce and pine forests, as well as forest margins.
