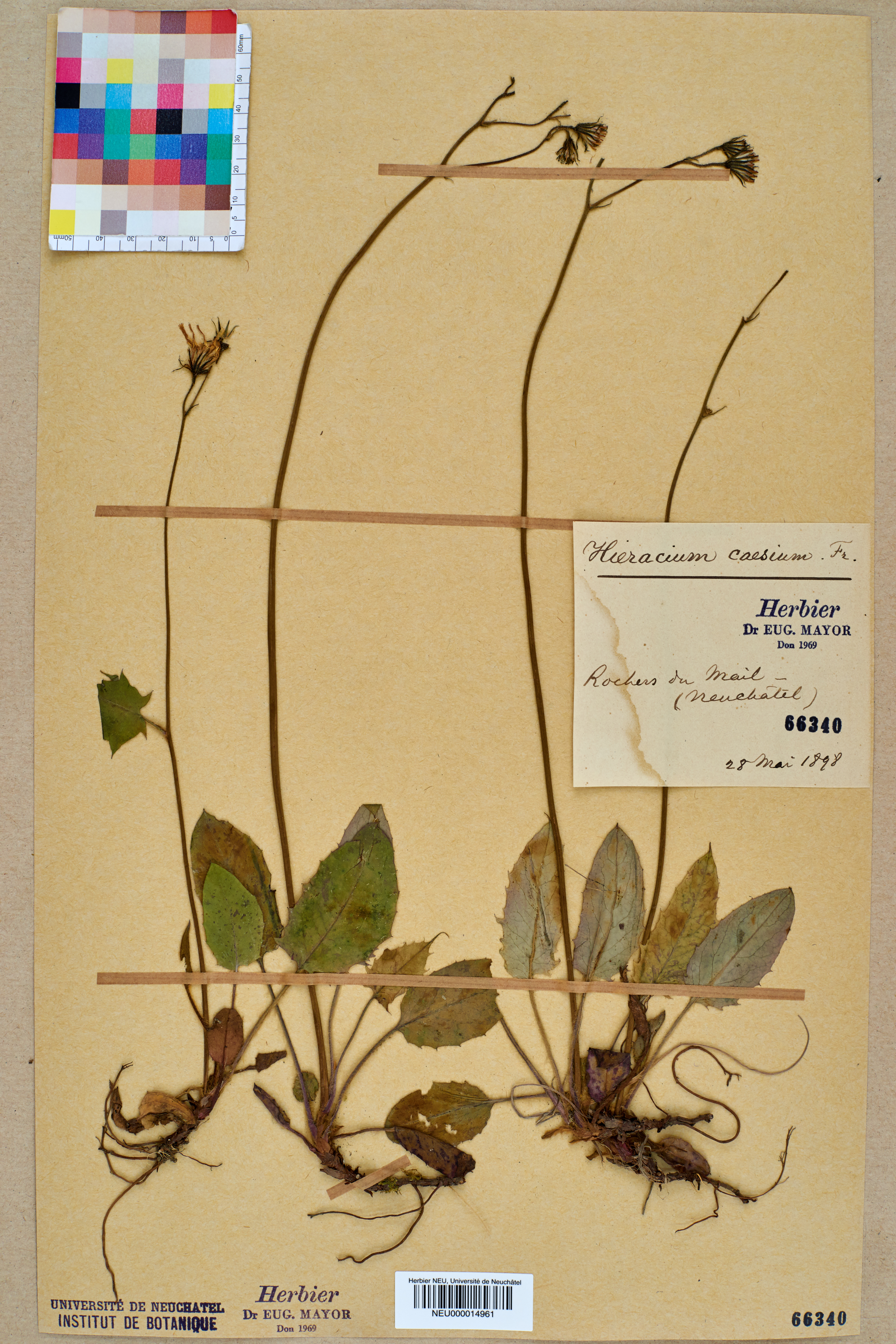
- Dried pressed specimen of Hieracium caesium

Scientific classification
- Kingdom: Plantae
- Clade: Tracheophytes
- Clade: Angiosperms
- Clade: Eudicots
- Clade: Asterids
- Order: Asterales
- Family: Asteraceae
- Genus: Hieracium
- Species: H. caesium

Binomial name
- Hieracium caesium Fr.

= Hieracium caesium =

Species of flowering plant

Hieracium caesium is a species of flowering plant belonging to the family Asteraceae.

Its native range is Europe.
