= Hieracium subcaesium =

Scientific classification
- Kingdom: Plantae
- Clade: Tracheophytes
- Clade: Angiosperms
- Clade: Eudicots
- Clade: Asterids
- Order: Asterales
- Family: Asteraceae
- Genus: Hieracium
- Species: H. subcaesium

Binomial name
- Hieracium subcaesium Fries ex Nyman

Species of flowering plant

Hieracium subcaesium is a species of flowering plant belonging to the family Asteraceae.

Synonym:

- Hieracium subcaesium subsp. subcaesium
