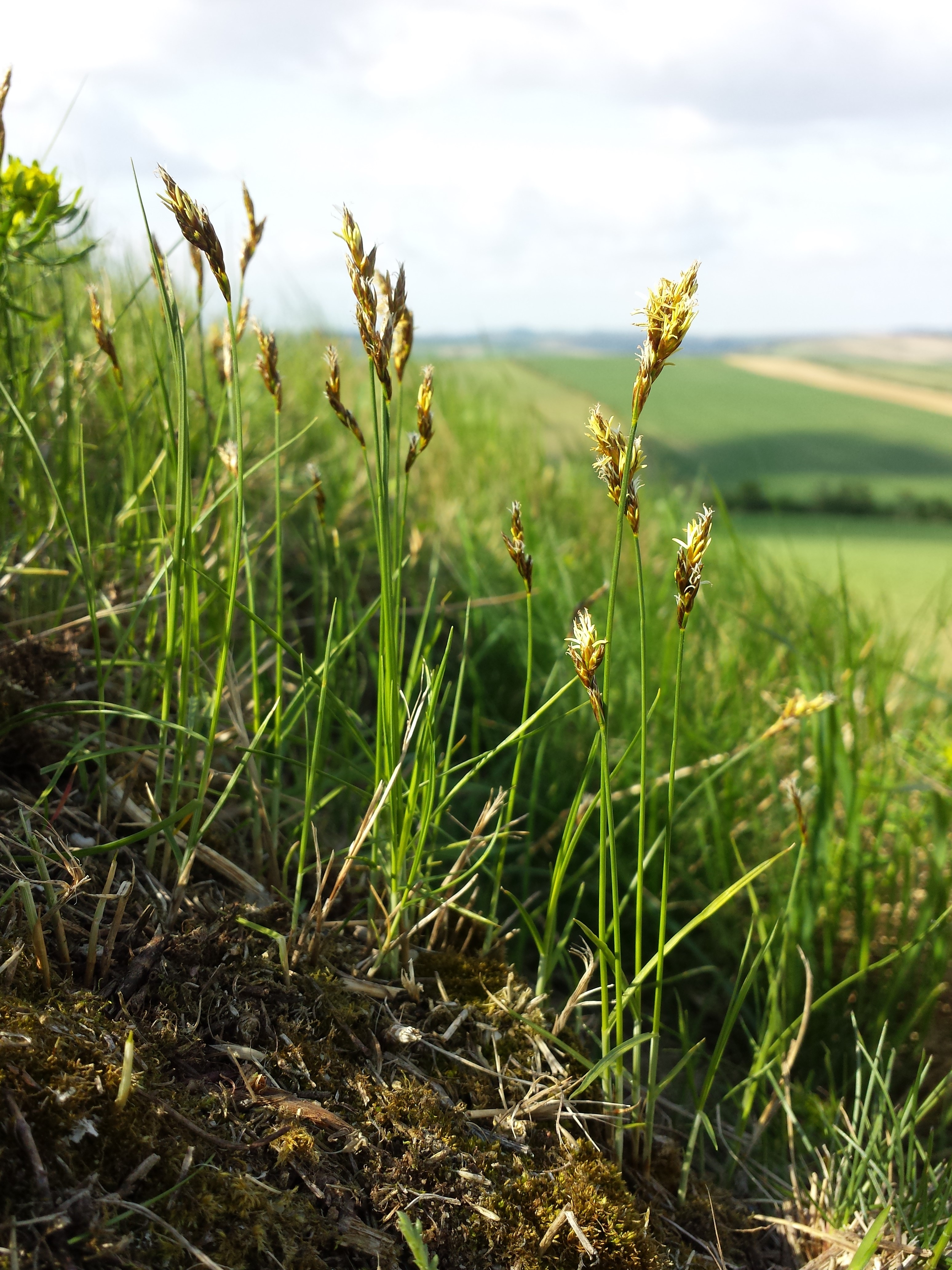
- Habitus

Scientific classification
- Kingdom: Plantae
- Clade: Tracheophytes
- Clade: Angiosperms
- Clade: Monocots
- Clade: Commelinids
- Order: Poales
- Family: Cyperaceae
- Genus: Carex
- Species: C. praecox

Binomial name
- Carex praecox Schreb.

Synonyms
- List: Carex arenaria Dubois ex Steud.; Carex aristata Honck.; Carex curvula Lam.; Carex pilulifera Geners. ex Boott; Carex praeceps Borkh. ex Rchb.; Carex praecox var. alata Zlinska; Carex praecox f. gracillima (Asch.) Soó; Carex praecox f. nana (Zapal.) Soó; Carex praecox f. petermannii Soó; Carex praecox f. podolica (Zapal.) Soó; Carex princeps Kunth; Carex pseudopraecox Schur; Carex schreberi Willd.; Carex schreberi Schrank; Carex sicyocarpa Lebel; Carex stolonifera Ehrh.; Carex tenella Thuill.; Carex velenovskyi Domin; Carex verna Torr. ex Kunth; Carex weiheana Boeckeler ex Kunth; Caricina multicaulis St.-Lag.; Neilreichia umbrosa Kotula; Trasus praecox (Schreb.) Gray; Vignea curvula Opiz; Vignea praecox (Schreb.) Soják; Vignea schreberi Rchb.

= Carex praecox =

Species of flowering plant

Carex praecox, the spring sedge, is a species of flowering plant in the genus Carex, native to Europe, western Asia, and Mongolia. Its diploid chromosome number is 2n=58, with some uncertainty.
