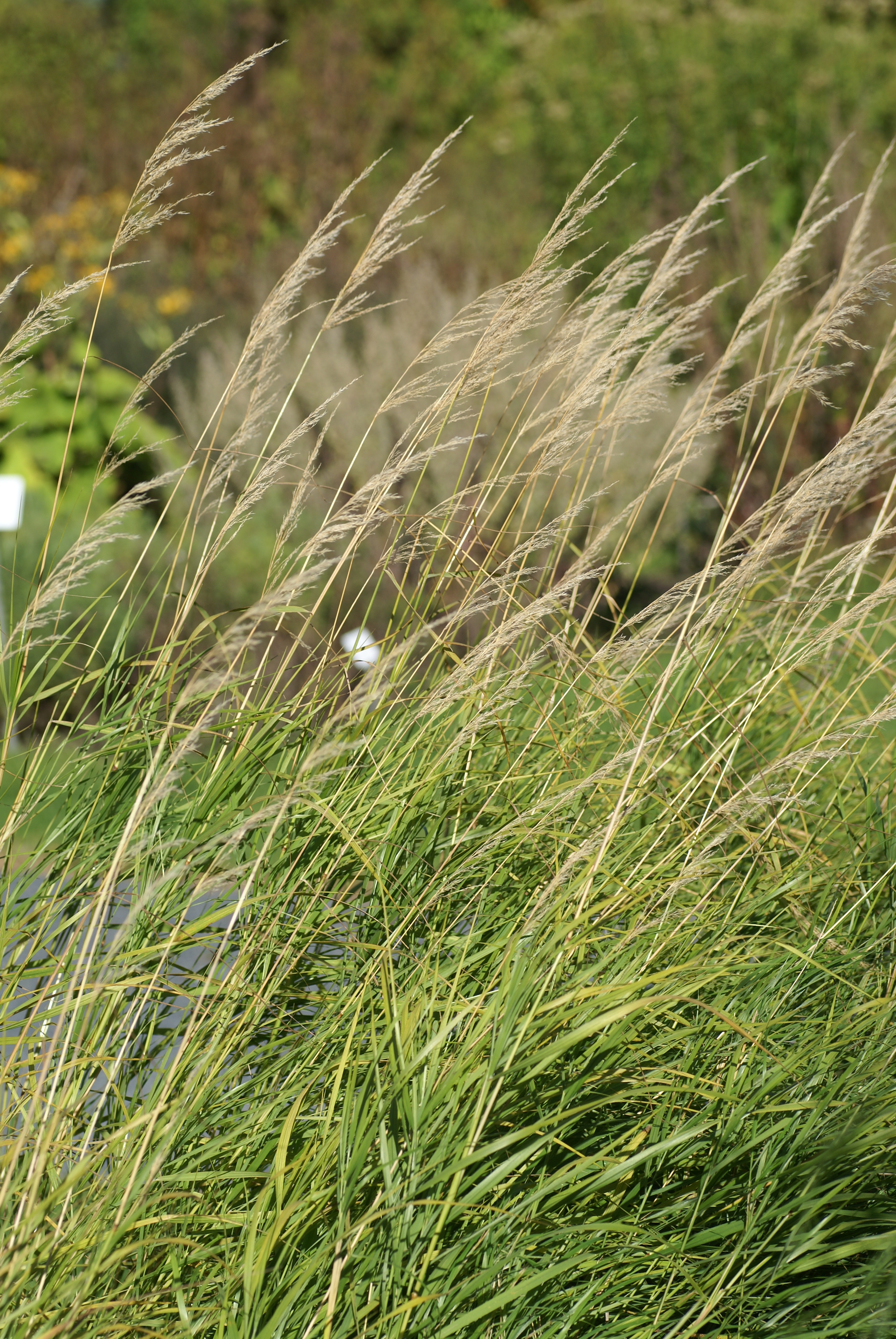

Scientific classification
- Kingdom: Plantae
- Clade: Tracheophytes
- Clade: Angiosperms
- Clade: Monocots
- Clade: Commelinids
- Order: Poales
- Family: Poaceae
- Subfamily: Pooideae
- Genus: Calamagrostis
- Species: C. purpurea

Binomial name
- Calamagrostis purpurea (Trin.) Trin.

Synonyms
- Calamagrostis phragmitoides Hartm.

= Calamagrostis purpurea =

Species of grass

Calamagrostis purpurea is a species of grass in the family Poaceae.

Its native range is subarctic and subalpine habitats.
