= Albysjön (Botkyrka) =

Lake between Huddinge and Botkyrka municipalities, Sweden

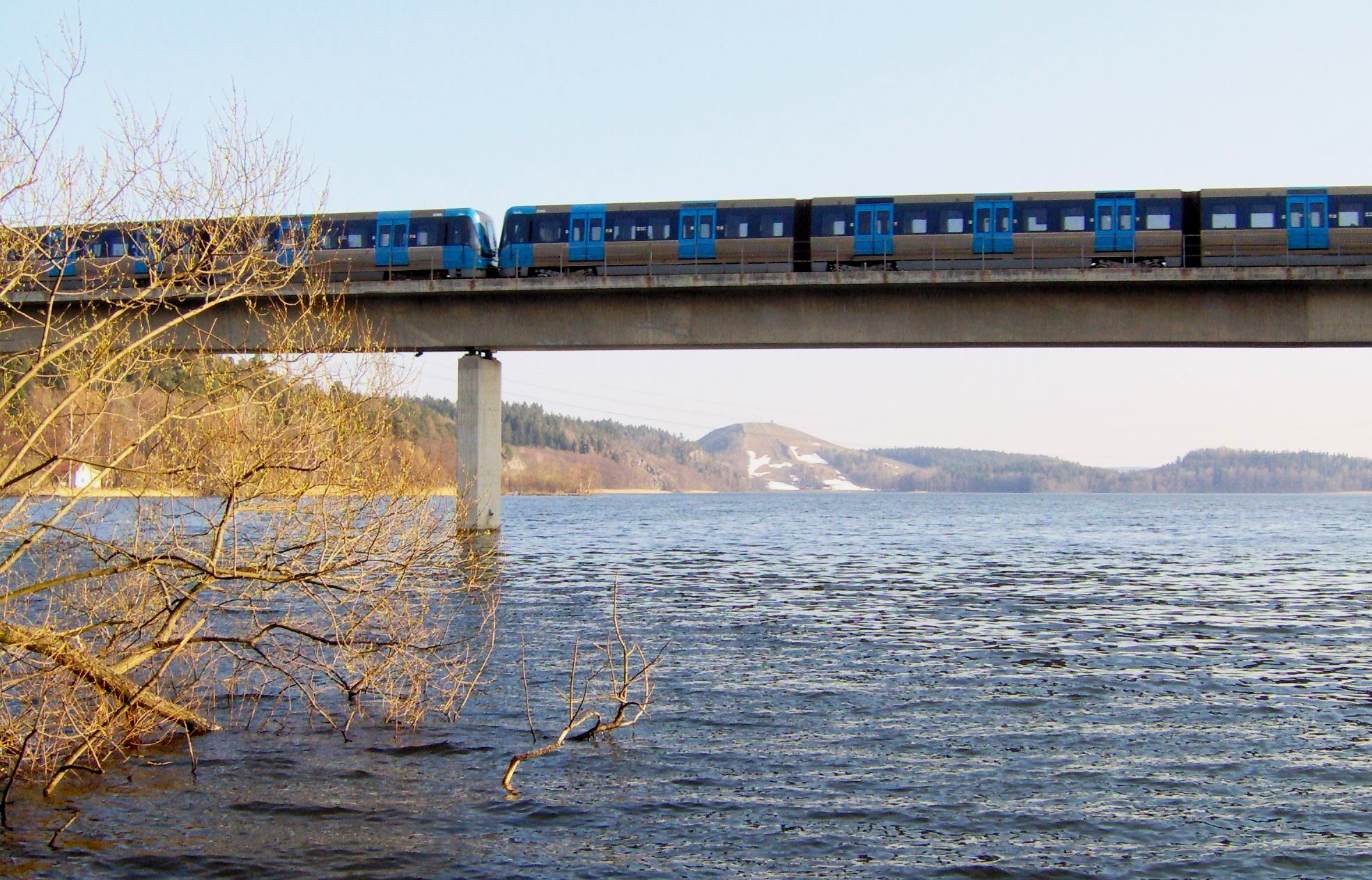
- The Stockholm Metro passing over Albysjön

- Location within Sweden
- Coordinates: 59°14′33.3″N 17°52′26.0″E
- Primary inflows: Tullingesjön
- Primary outflows: Vårbyfjärden
- Catchment area: 84.1 km^{2} (32.5 sq mi)
- Basin countries: Sweden
- Surface area: 118 ha (290 acres)
- Average depth: 8.3 m (27 ft)
- Max. depth: 24 m (79 ft)
- Water volume: 9.7 km^{3} (2.3 cu mi)
- Residence time: 0.5 year
- Shore length^{1}: 6,470 m (21,230 ft)
- Surface elevation: −0.16 m (−0.52 ft)
- Settlements: Huddinge, Botkyrka
- ^{1} Shore length is not a well-defined measure.

Albysjön (Swedish for "Lake Alby") is a lake forming part of Lake Mälaren. It separates Botkyrka Municipality and Huddinge Municipality in south-western Stockholm, Sweden.

The lake, which is filling a geological fault, has steep cliffs along the western shore. To the north it connects to Vårbyfjärden through the narrow strait Fittja näset. It is an important recreational area for inhabitants in the neighbouring suburbs Alby, Vårby gård, and Myrstuguberget, as well as for a large number of other visitors attracted by the Flottsbro Open-air Area and its bath in the southern end of the lake.

== Catchment area ==
Next to the bath in the southern end of the lake is the tallest ski slope in Stockholm together with Gömsta Äng Nature Reserve. Angling is free on the lake and very popular in summers, while jigging attracts many people in winters when ice cover allows. The Flottsbro Open-air Area offers walking tracks, restaurants, camping, and many other open-air facilities available throughout the year. In summers kayaks, canoes, Canadian canoes are available for rent.

=== Environmental impact ===
Albysjön is rich in nutrients derived mostly from the surrounding catchment area. The lake receives stormwater discharge from a 6 km^{2} large area in Botkyrka and a 4 km^{2} area in Huddinge.

== Flora and fauna ==
The aquatic flora composed of reed, common club-rush, flowering rush, yellow iris, greater water-parsnip, brooklime, bulbous rush, toad rush, eight-stamened waterwort, needle spike-rush, spring quillwort, amphibious bistort, pale persicaria, rigid hornwort, horned pondweed, perfoliate pondweed, blunt-leaved pondweed, grass-wrack pondweed, fennel pondweed, various-leaved pondweed, lesser pondweed, fan-leaved water-goosefoot, whorled water-milfoil, alternate water-milfoil, spiked water-milfoil, Canadian waterweed, Nuttall's waterweed, and common duckweed. There are stoneworts such as Chara delicatula and Nitella flexilis.

On the shores are plants like alders, hybrid crack willows, osiers, elms, ashes, grey willow, birch, aspens, great yellow-cress, gypsywort, skullcap, whorled mint (a hybrid species between corn mint and water mint), trifid bur-marigold, slender tufted-sedge, reed sweet-grass, annual meadow-grass, silverweed and purple-loosestrife.

Naturally occurring fishes are smelt, northern pike, roach, rudd, tench, bleak, silver bream, carp bream, eel, burbot, perch, zander, and ruffe. The spined loach was discovered in 2002 and occasionally salmon and brown trout find their way into the lake, the later introduced in a local brook in 1992-93.

The invasive bivalve zebra mussel was first documented in Lake Mälaren in the 1920s and was confirmed in Albysjön in 2002. Other molluscs include painter's mussel, duck mussel, river nerite, and river snail. Crayfishes are not documented in the lake but as the signal crayfish is present throughout Lake Mälaren it is believed to be present in Albysjön as well.

Commons birds include the Canada goose, mute swan, mallard, great crested grebe, coot, goldeneye, gull, herring gull, black-headed gull, and reed bunting. In the summer common visitors include osprey, grey heron and great cormorant.

== See also ==
- Geography of Stockholm
- Albysjön, Tyresö
