= Vårbyfjärden =

Strait in Sweden

- Location within Stockholm
- Coordinates: 59°16′0″N 17°51′0″E
- Basin countries: Sweden
- Max. depth: 17 m (56 ft)
- Surface elevation: 0.3 m (1 ft 0 in)
- Islands: Estbröte, Slagsta holme
- Settlements: Huddinge

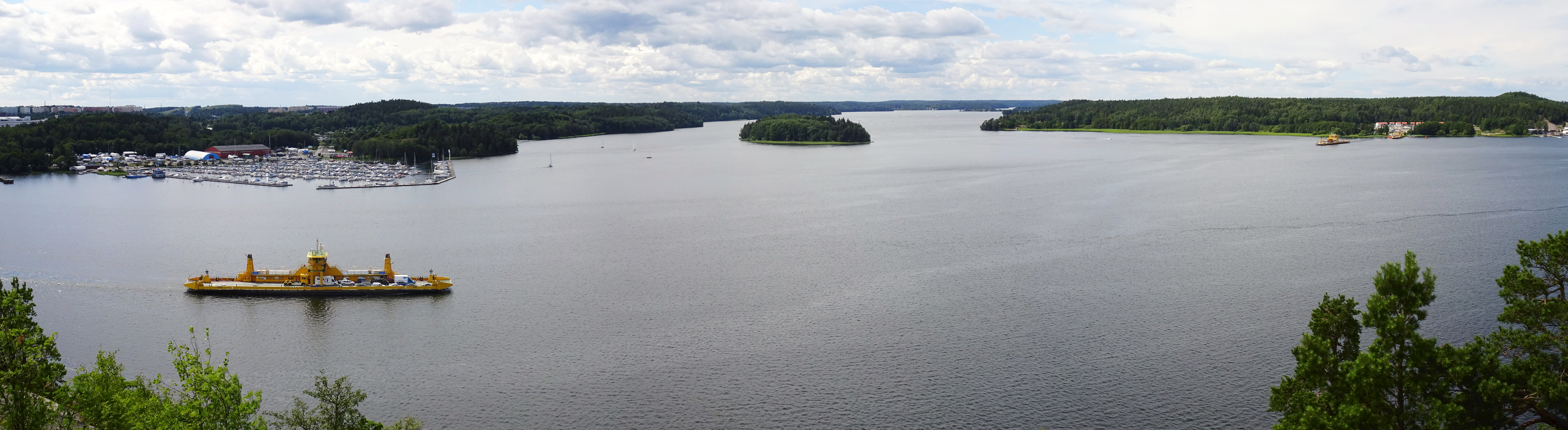
Vårbyfjärden

Vårbyfjärden (Swedish for "inlet of Vårby") is a strait in south-eastern Lake Mälaren south-west of Stockholm in Sweden.

Vårbyfjärden separates Ekerö island and Ekerö Municipality north of it, from Södertälje and Huddinge Municipalities south of it and Stockholm Municipality on its western side. South of Vårbyfjärden is Albysjön,

== History ==
Of the three islands in the bay, Estbröte, appears in the Chronicle of Eric. In 1206, the wife of the legendary Jarl Jon Jarl caught a band of Estonian pirates on the island and had them all executed as a revenge for her husband's death.

The eastern shore is known to have been inhabited since pre-historic times, when beacons there were ignited to warn when hostile ships approached. A man who guarded the strait was called a vörðr, which gave the bay and various locations surrounding it their names. A treasure from the 10th century found there contained Arabian coins and jewels, so apparently the bay was important for navigation. The mansion of Vårby gård was built in the 18th century and encompassed most of the area west of the bay. All the mansion's buildings, including greenhouses with exotic trees and bushes, have been demolished, but parts of the gardens are still used for allotment gardens.

== Catchment area ==
Vårbyfjärden, which is surrounded by several suburbs such as Botkyrka, Skärholmen, and Vårby gård, is an important recreational area for thousands of people. Fishing, sailing, canoeing, and bathing are popular activities during summers. There is a marina at Slagsta where ferries offers trips across the bay.

=== Environmental impact ===
Water quality is good as the strait is located downstream from Södra Björkfjärden, one of the largest and cleanest bodies of water in Lake Mälaren. The marina at Slagsta contributes some oil and paint spills. Closer to Stockholm stormwater discharge causes increased levels of chloride and phosphorus.

== Flora and fauna ==
Vascular plants present include reed, common club-rush, cattail, Scottish dock, flowering rush, yellow iris, water plantain, shoreweed, spring quillwort, quillwort, eight-stamened waterwort, needle spike-rush, amphibious bistort, arrowhead, perfoliate pondweed, fennel pondweed, lesser pondweed, various-leaved pondweed, grass-wrack pondweed, rigid hornswort, horned pondweed, Nuttail's waterweed, alternate water-milfoil, spiked water-milfoil, and autumnal water-starwort.

Along the shores grow trees such as ash, elm, hybrid crack willow, oak, aspen, bird cherry, black alder, bay willow, grey willow, and goat willow.

There are 33 naturally occurring fish species in Vårbysfjärden, making it the richest in fish species in Sweden. Common species include northern pike, perch, roach, rudd, silver bream, carp bream, bleak, European smelt, zander, burbot, tench, and crucian carp. Additionally, there a range of introduced species such as lake trout, char, salmon, and spined loach. The presence of fourhorn sculpins is a reminder from the time when lake Mälaren was a still bay forming part of the Baltic Sea.

Vårbyfjärden was one of the first maritime environments in Sweden to suffer crayfish plague which hit the lake in 1907. The plague was introduced in Lake Mälaren by affected animals thrown into the water at Kornhamnstorg in central Stockholm, from where ships carrying crayfishes spread the disease further inland. Since then signal crayfish has been introduced.

Common birds include mallard, coot, goldeneye, merganser, common gull, black-headed gull, herring gull, great black-backed gull, lesser black-backed gull, great cormorant, great crested grebe, mute swan, common sandpiper, and grey heron. Along the shores long-tailed tit, thrush nightingale, and lesser spotted woodpecker are common birds. White-tailed eagle and osprey visit the lake regularly, while some other species are seen less frequently, such as black-throated diver and common moorhen.

Northern bat, Daubenton's bat, soprano pipistrelle, and Brandt's bat have been observed during guided tours around Vårby Gård. Amphibians include common frog and toads.

== See also ==
- Geography of Stockholm
