= Callitriche angustifolia =

Callitriche angustifolia is a botanical synonym of two species of plant:

- Callitriche hermaphroditica, synonym published in 1792 by Jean-Emmanuel Gilibert
- Callitriche palustris, synonym published in 1792 by David Heinrich Hoppe
