= Long Loch (Angus) =

- Long Loch of Lundie
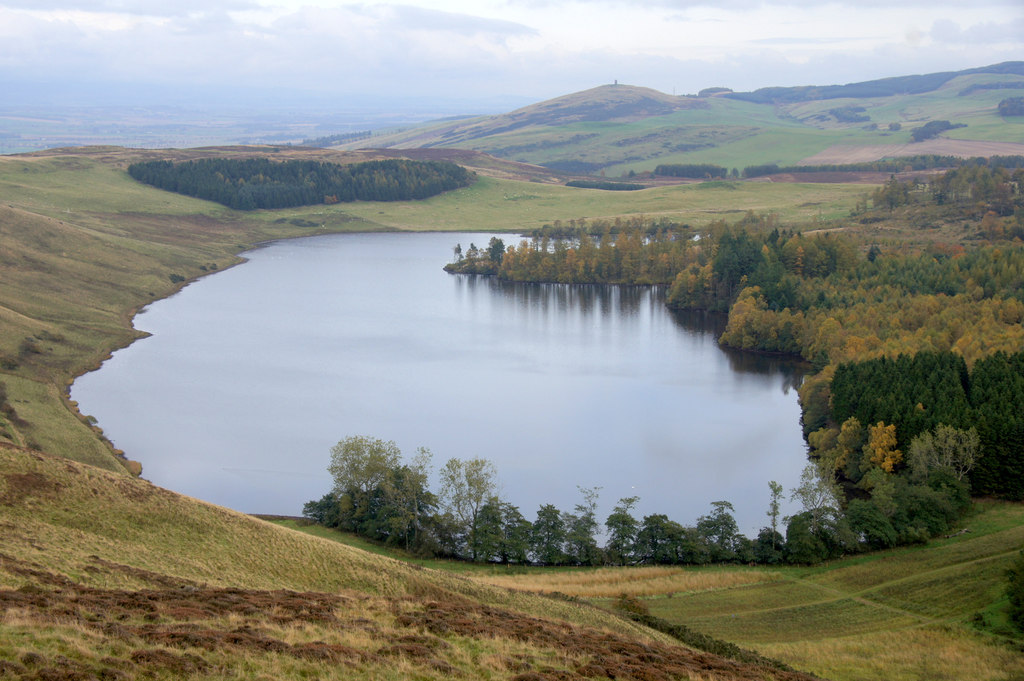
- Long Loch from Westerkeith Hill with Kinpurney Hill in the background.

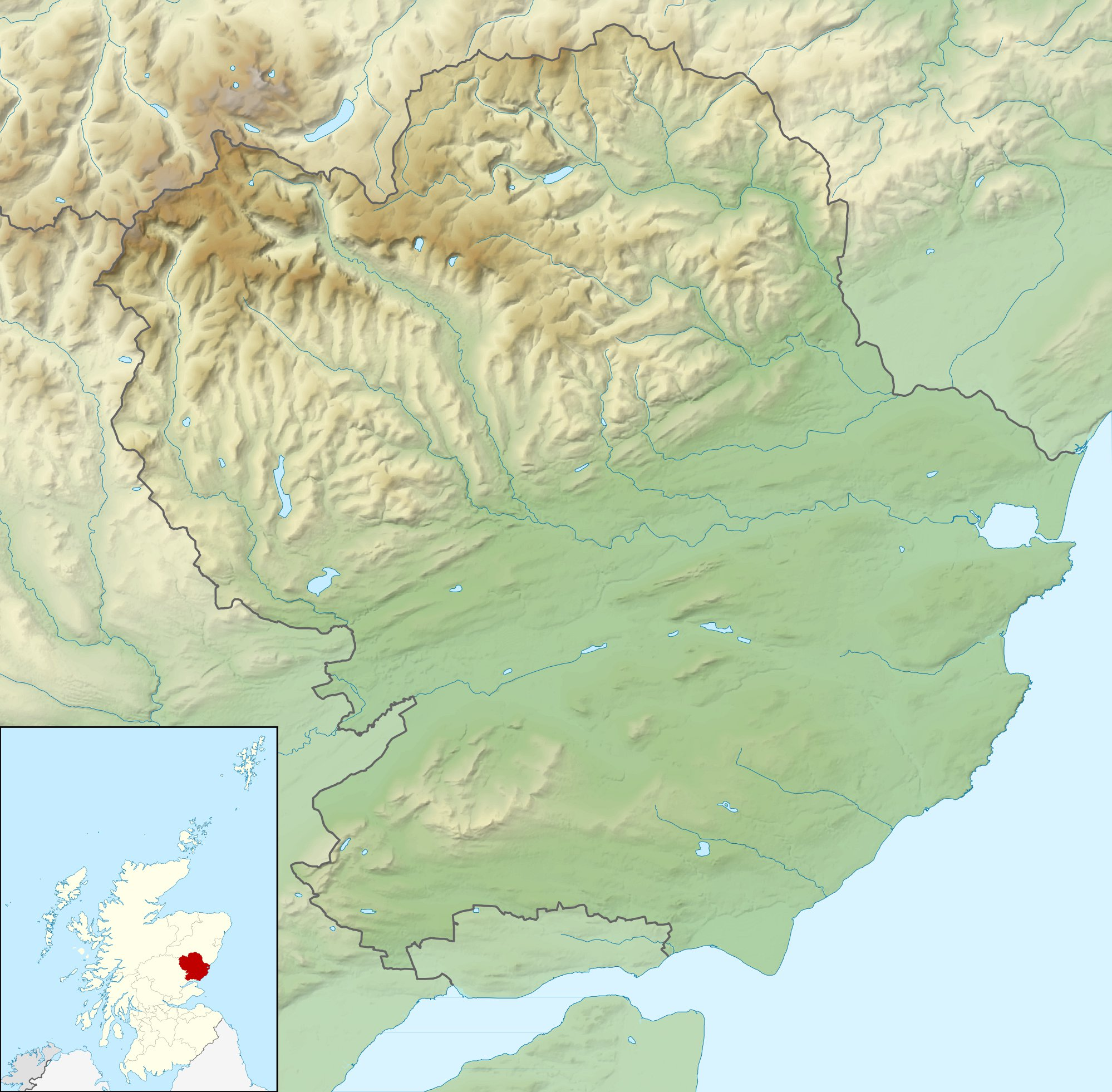
- Location within Angus
- Location: NO28983879
- Coordinates: 56.5358°N 3.1563°W
- Type: Freshwater loch
- Etymology: Mesotrophic
- Max. length: 1.2 km (0.75 mi)
- Max. width: 0.4 km (0.25 mi)
- Surface area: 29 ha (72 acres)
- Average depth: 10 ft (3.0 m)
- Max. depth: 42 ft (13 m)
- Water volume: 31,893,000 ft^{3} (903,100 m^{3})
- Shore length^{1}: 3 km (1.9 mi)
- Surface elevation: 233 m (764 ft)
- Max. temperature: 58.4 °F (14.7 °C)
- Min. temperature: 53.2 °F (11.8 °C)
- Islands: 0
- ^{1} Shore length is not a well-defined measure.

Long Loch is a small lowland freshwater loch within the Sidlaw Hills in Angus. It is 1.8 miles south of the village of Newtyle, three miles east-south-east of Coupar Angus and 2 miles directly north of Lundie. It is peculiar in shape, resembling a dog's body without legs and is on a north-east to south-west orientation.

== Geography ==
The west of the loch is heavily wooded by Palmer Wood. Along the shoreline there is fen vegetation with species such as bottle sedge, water horsetail, reeds and reed canary grass. Found along the edge of the loch are Littorella, needle spikerush. In the water there is the aquatic herb Ranunculus circinatus and pond weed milfoil. In recent years an invasive species, Canadian waterweed has appeared.

The loch is a designated Site of Special Scientific Interest (SSSI).

== See also ==
- List of lochs in Scotland
