= Pitlyal Loch =

Loch in Angus, Scotland

- Round Loch (English)
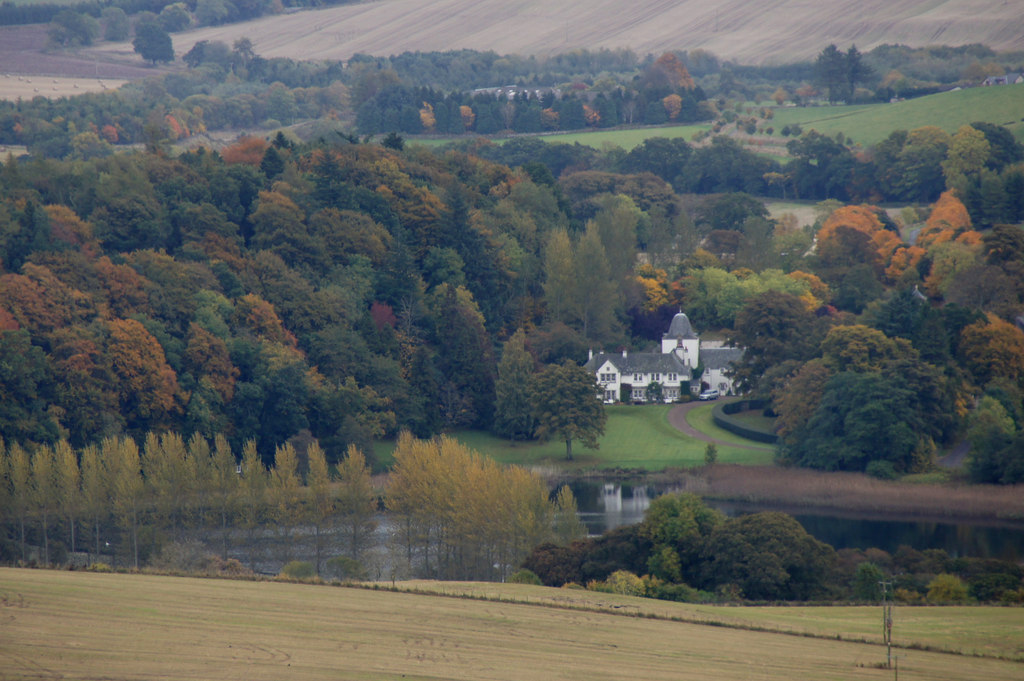
- Thriepley beside Pitlyal Loch, from Lundie Craigs

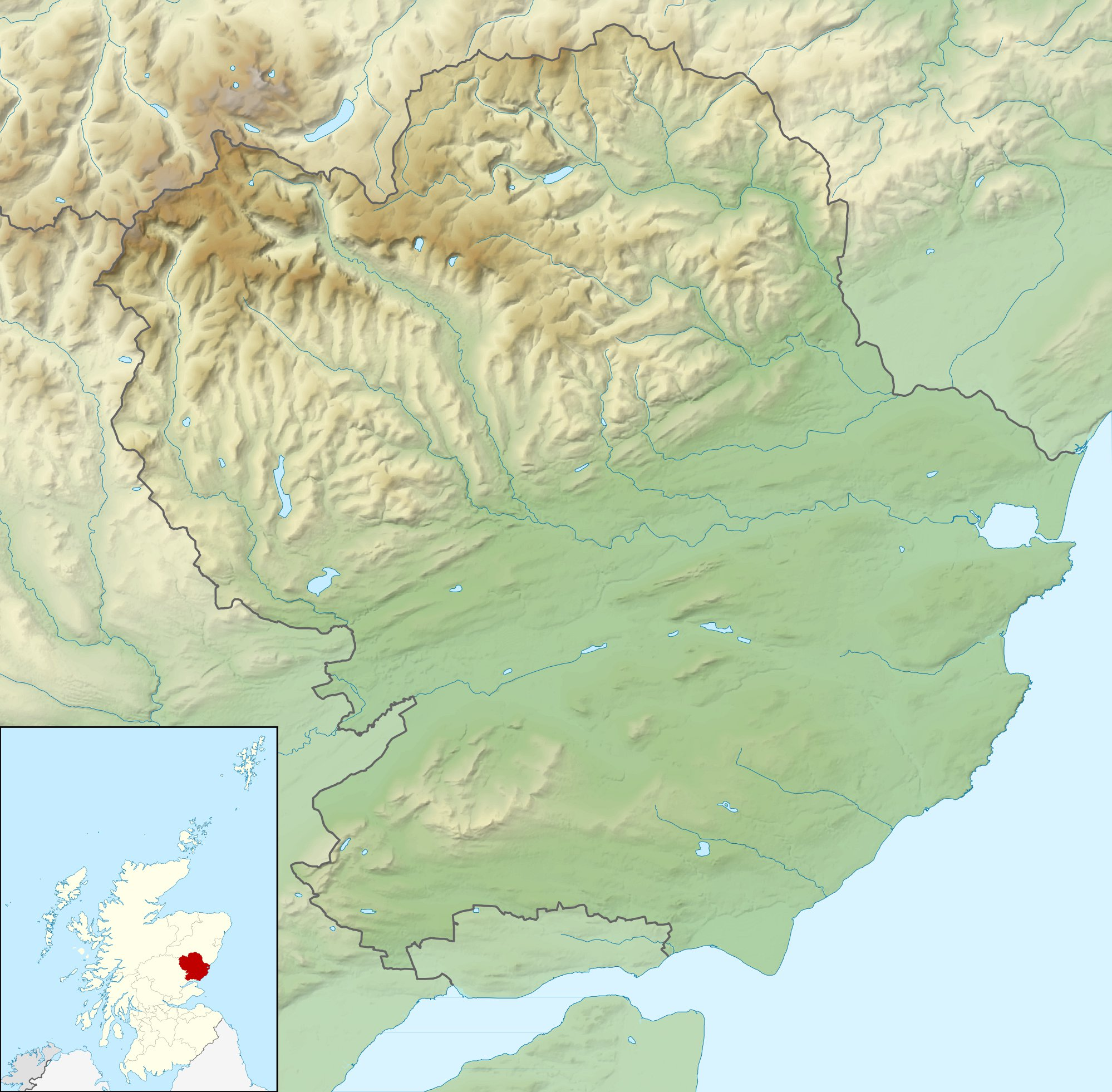
- Location within Angus
- Location: NO 2997 3823
- Coordinates: 56.5308°N 3.1399°W
- Type: Freshwater loch
- Max. length: 0.32 km (0.20 mi)
- Max. width: 0.22 km (0.14 mi)
- Surface area: 5 ha (12 acres)
- Average depth: 8.5 ft (2.6 m)
- Max. depth: 19 ft (5.8 m)
- Water volume: 5,347,000 ft^{3} (151,400 m^{3})
- Shore length^{1}: 1 km (0.62 mi)
- Surface elevation: 188 m (617 ft)
- Max. temperature: 59 °F (15 °C)
- Min. temperature: 55 °F (13 °C)
- Islands: 0
- ^{1} Shore length is not a well-defined measure.

Pitlyal Loch also known as Round Loch is a small lochan in Sidlaw Hills in Angus. It is located southeast of Long Loch and is almost directly south of Newtyle and 5 miles (8 km) south-by-south-east of Coupar Angus.

== Geography ==
The loch is a designated Site of Special Scientific Interest (SSSI).

== See also ==
- List of lochs in Scotland
