= Callitriche pulchra =

Conservation status
- Critically Endangered (IUCN 3.1)

Scientific classification
- Kingdom: Plantae
- Clade: Tracheophytes
- Clade: Angiosperms
- Clade: Eudicots
- Clade: Asterids
- Order: Lamiales
- Family: Plantaginaceae
- Genus: Callitriche
- Species: C. pulchra

Binomial name
- Callitriche pulchra Schotsman

Species of flowering plant

Callitriche pulchra is a species of flowering plant in the family Plantaginaceae. It is a freshwater aquatic plant (hydrosubshrub) native to Crete, Cyprus, and Libya. It was described in 1967 from specimens gathered on Gavdos Island, Crete by H. D. Schotsman. Additionally, two of Pamapani's specimens were identified at Le Due Palme. Schotsman thereafter classified in 1968 in three different ponds located in Cyrenaica. It was listed in the 2012 IUCN Red List of Threatened Species as critically endangered. In 2015 Callitriche pulchra was detected in Cyprus, somewhat reducing its endangered status. Other locations it has been encountered include Greece, Libya and Syria.
