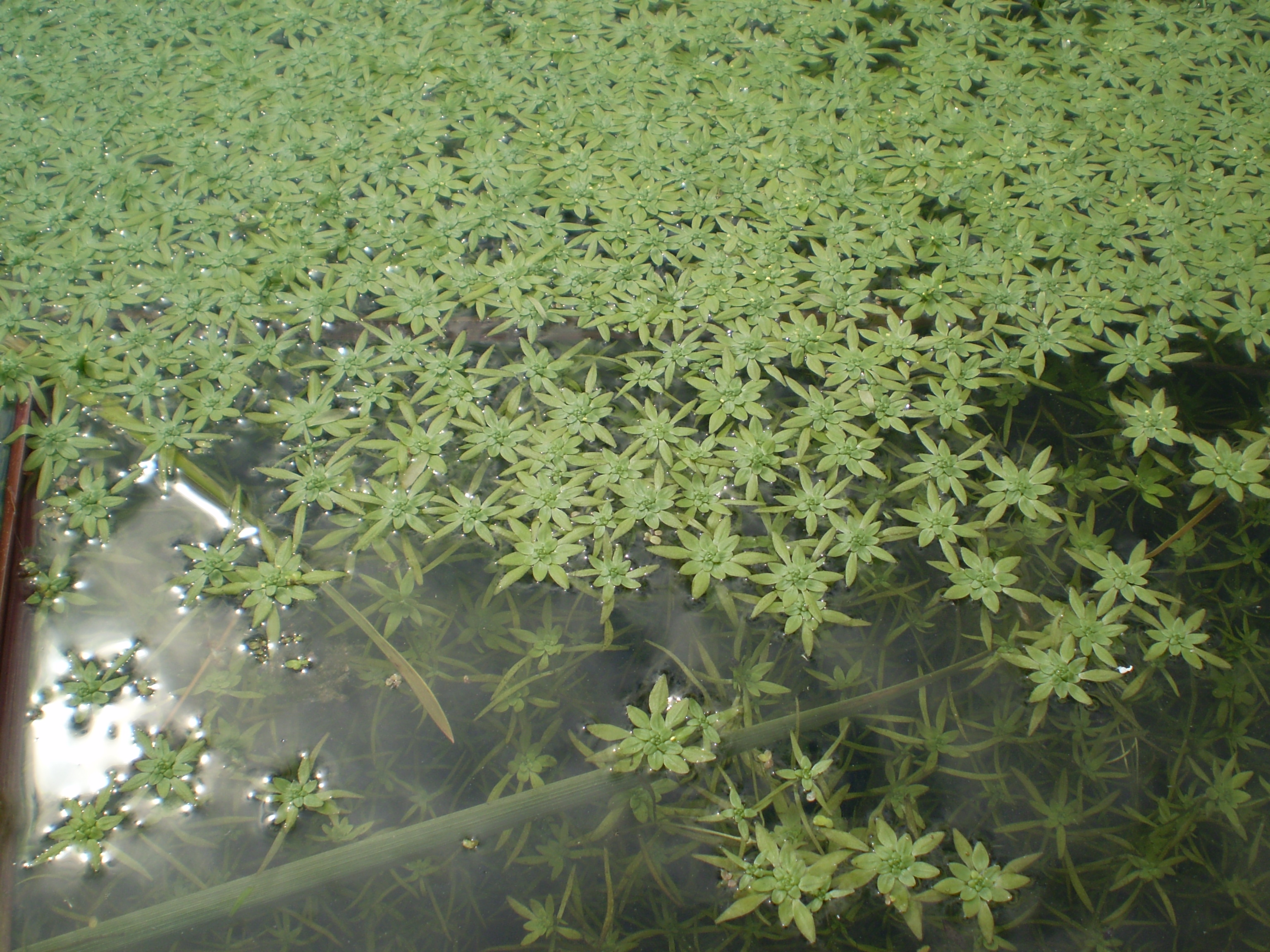

Scientific classification
- Kingdom: Plantae
- Clade: Tracheophytes
- Clade: Angiosperms
- Clade: Eudicots
- Clade: Asterids
- Order: Lamiales
- Family: Plantaginaceae
- Genus: Callitriche
- Species: C. cophocarpa

Binomial name
- Callitriche cophocarpa Sendtn.

= Callitriche cophocarpa =

Species of flowering plant

Callitriche cophocarpa is a species of flowering plant native to Europe, Russia, and Northern Africa.

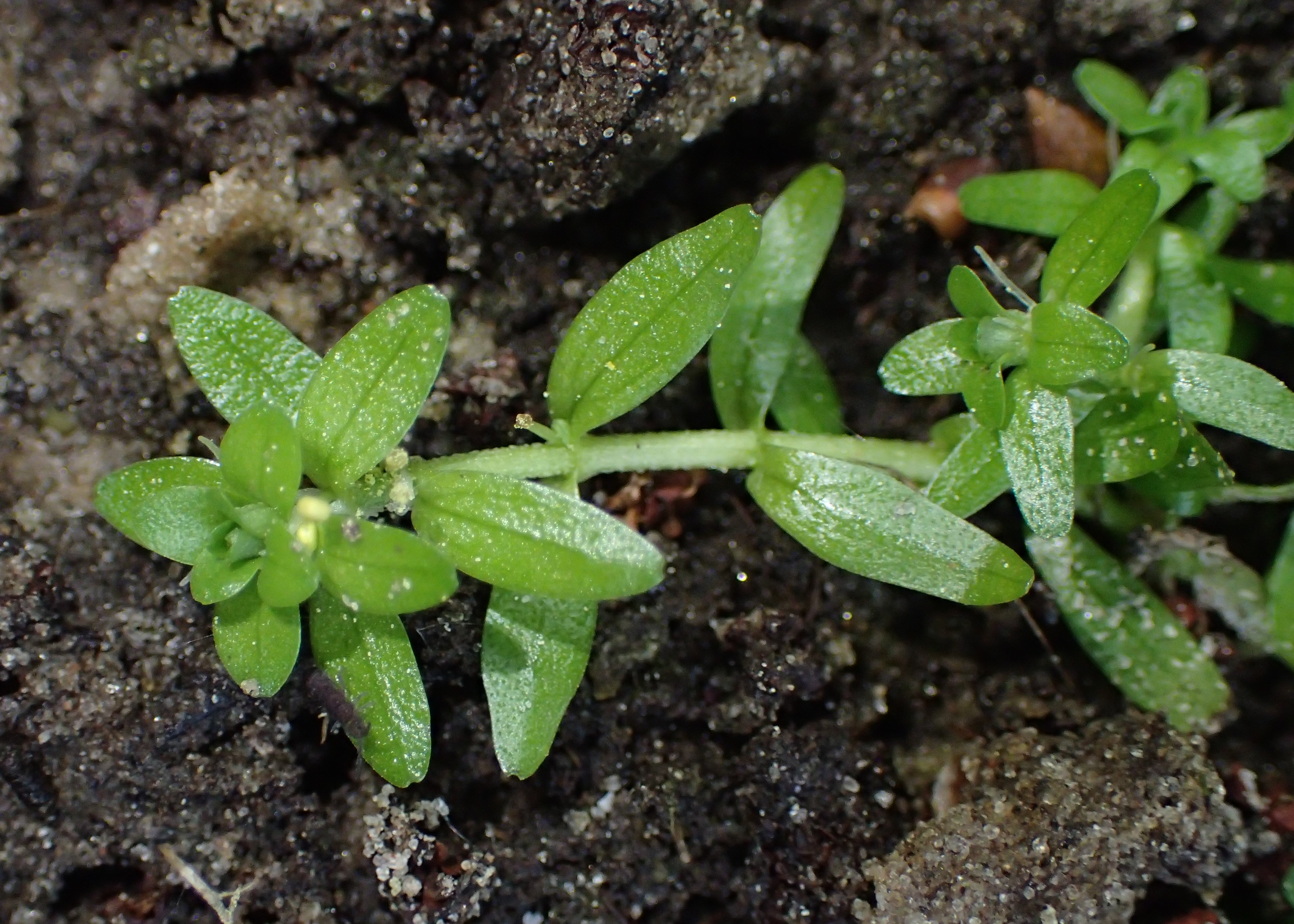
Close-up
