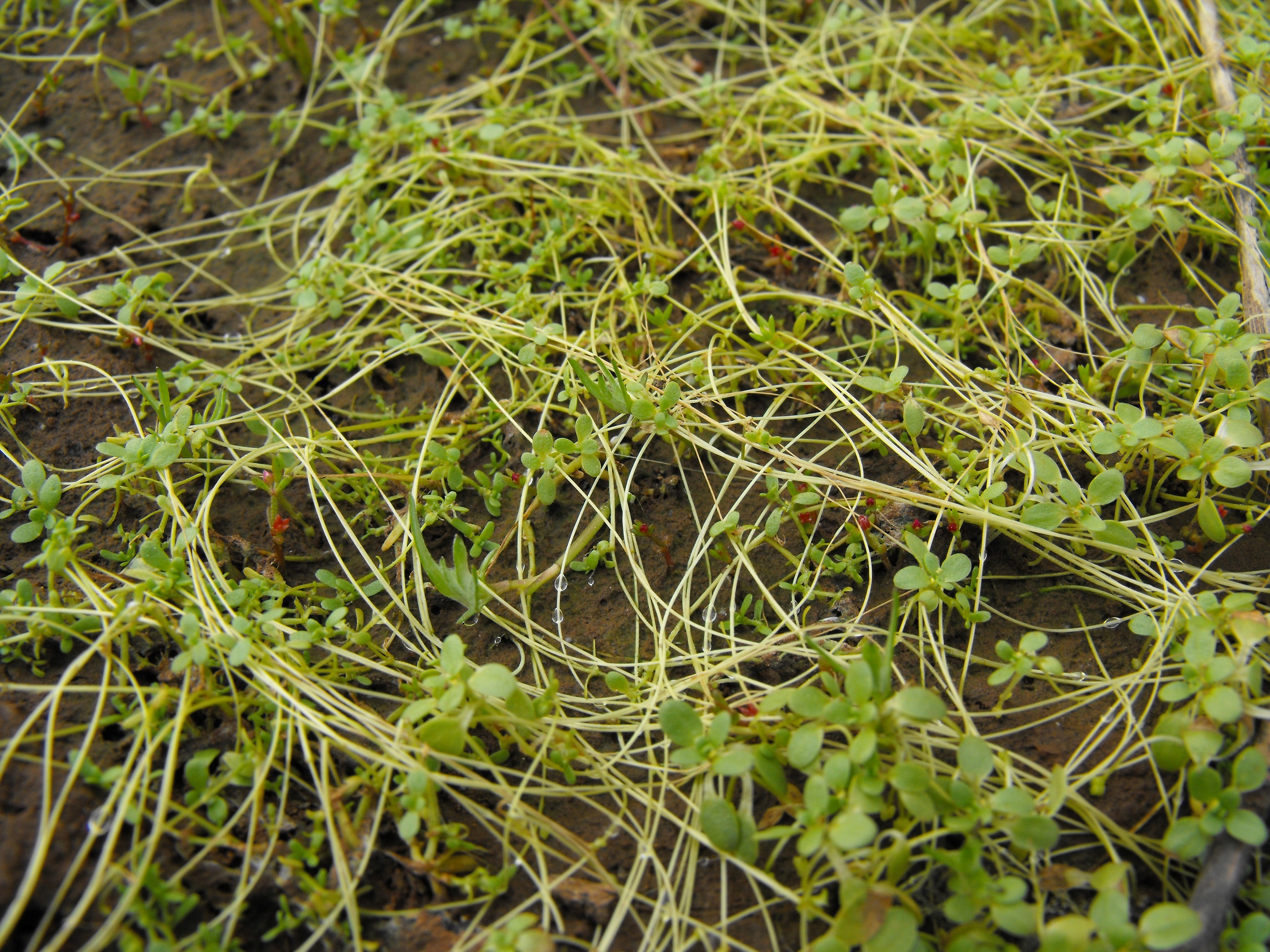

Conservation status
- Apparently Secure (NatureServe)

Scientific classification
- Kingdom: Plantae
- Clade: Tracheophytes
- Clade: Angiosperms
- Clade: Eudicots
- Clade: Asterids
- Order: Lamiales
- Family: Plantaginaceae
- Genus: Callitriche
- Species: C. marginata

Binomial name
- Callitriche marginata Torr. (1857)

Synonyms
- Callitriche marginata var. torreyana Hegelm. (1867); Callitriche sepulta S.Watson (1879)

= Callitriche marginata =

Species of aquatic plant

Callitriche marginata is a species of aquatic plant known by the common name winged water starwort. Callitriche marginata is native to the west coast of North America from British Columbia to Baja California, where it grows in and around vernal pools.

== Distribution ==
It is secure in the southern part of its range in California and Baja, but is rare in Oregon, unknown in Washington, and known from only eight occurrences in British Columbia. In California, it is found from the Coast Ranges, Transverse Ranges, and Peninsular Ranges, through the Central Valley to the High Sierra Nevada.

== Description ==
It forms a floating mat of tiny leaf rosettes attached by long, hairlike stems to its roots in the mud substrate. The stems, each up to about 10 centimeters long, form a tangle when the plant grows outside of the water. The inflorescence sometimes has two inflated whitish bracts alongside the flower. The seeds remain dormant in the soil during the dry season.
