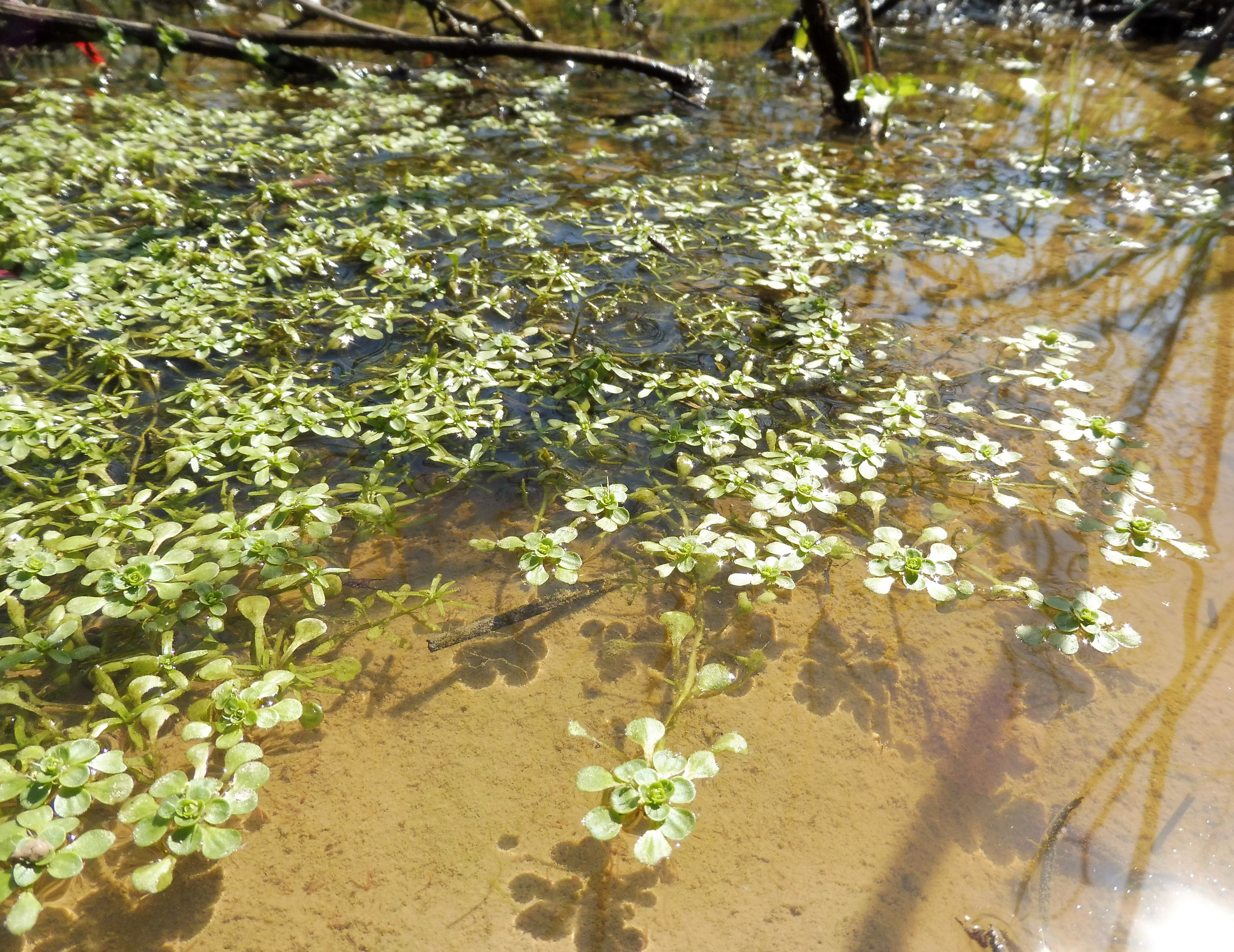

Conservation status
- Secure (NatureServe)

Scientific classification
- Kingdom: Plantae
- Clade: Tracheophytes
- Clade: Angiosperms
- Clade: Eudicots
- Clade: Asterids
- Order: Lamiales
- Family: Plantaginaceae
- Genus: Callitriche
- Species: C. heterophylla

Binomial name
- Callitriche heterophylla Pursh

= Callitriche heterophylla =

Aquatic plant species in the veronica family

Callitriche heterophylla, commonly called twoheaded water-starwort, is a species of flowering plant in the family Plantaginaceae. It is native to North America, where it found in the north from Greenland to Alaska, south to Mexico. It is widespread in the United States. Its natural habitat is in a wide variety of wetlands, including ponds, streams, and mudflats. It is typically found in areas of still or slow moving water.

Callitriche heterophylla is an aquatic plant, growing almost entirely submerged except for its floating stem tips. It produces minutely small flowers throughout the growing season.

== Taxonomy ==
Callitriche heterophylla was scientifically described and named in 1813 by Frederick Traugott Pursh. It is part of the genus Callitriche which is classified in the family Plantaginaceae. According to Plants of the World Online it has eleven heterotypic synonyms.

Table of Synonyms
Name	Year	Rank	Notes
Callitriche anceps Fernald	1908	species	
Callitriche asagraei Hegelm.	1864	species	
Callitriche bolanderi Hegelm.	1868	species	
Callitriche brevifolia Pursh	1813	species	
Callitriche cruciata Raf.	1811	species	nom. utique rej.
Callitriche heterophylla subsp. bolanderi (Hegelm.) Calder & Roy L.Taylor	1963	subspecies	
Callitriche heterophylla var. bolanderi (Hegelm.) Fassett	1951	variety	
Callitriche ovata Raf.	1811	species	nom. utique rej.
Callitriche palustris var. bolanderi (Hegelm.) Jeps.	1936	variety	
Callitriche spuria Raf.	1808	species	nom. utique rej.
Callitriche tuerckheimii Urb.	1912	species	
