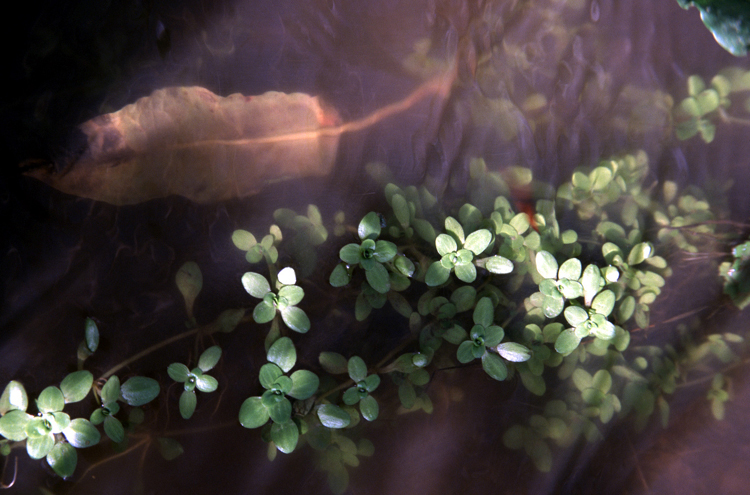

Scientific classification
- Kingdom: Plantae
- Clade: Tracheophytes
- Clade: Angiosperms
- Clade: Eudicots
- Clade: Asterids
- Order: Lamiales
- Family: Plantaginaceae
- Genus: Callitriche
- Species: C. stagnalis

Binomial name
- Callitriche stagnalis Scop.

= Callitriche stagnalis =

Species of aquatic plant

Callitriche stagnalis is a perennial aquatic vascular plant species. Also known as pond water-starwort, C. stagnalis, may thrive in a variety of aquatic and subaquatic habitats, specially those exhibiting slowly moving to non-moving water. Although C. stagnalis does not pose a threat to humans, its reproductive rate may pose a threat to native vegetation in areas where it has been introduced, as the resulting dense vegetative mats frequently out-compete native species.

== Morphology ==
=== General structure ===
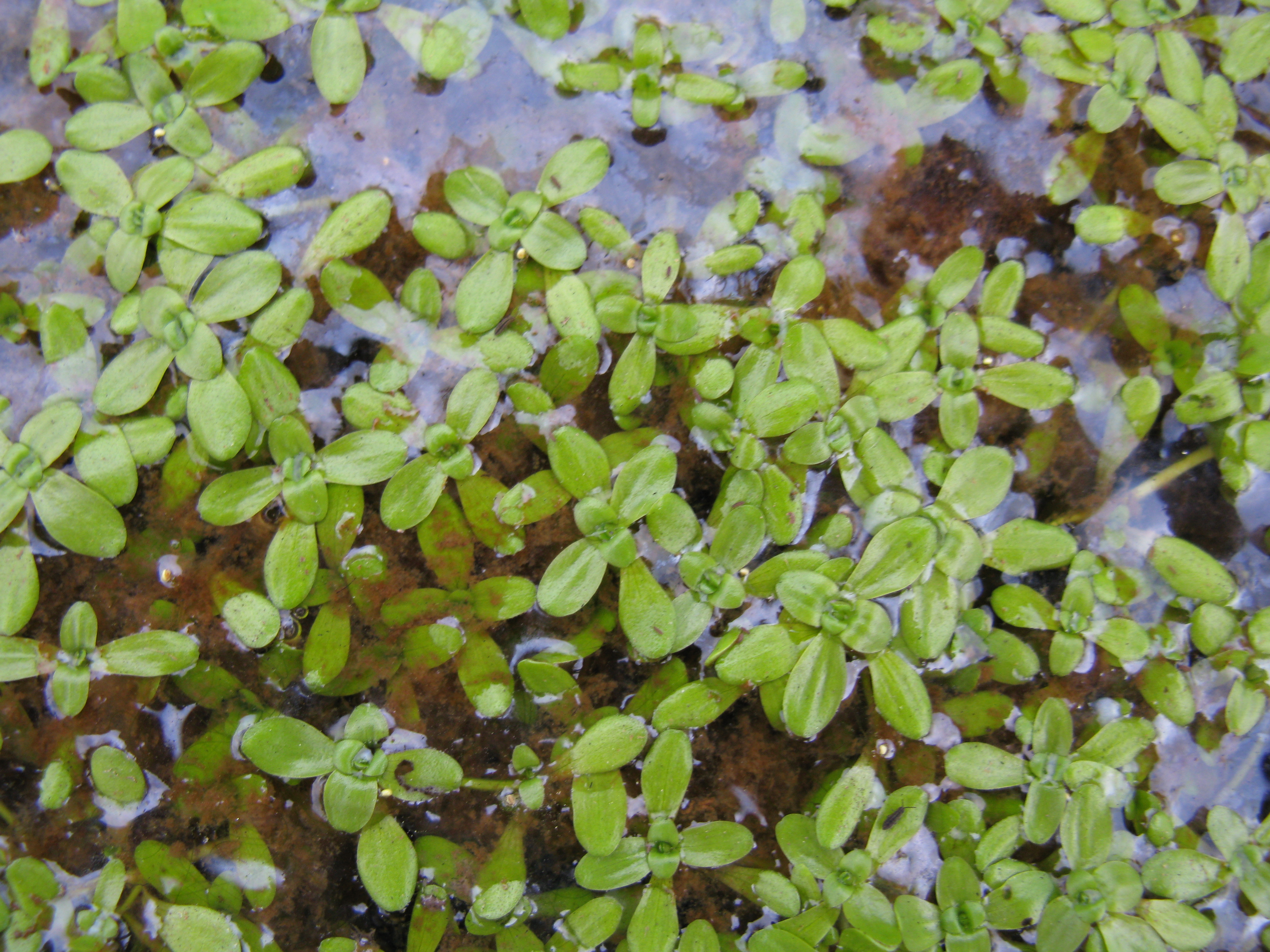
Leaves of C. stagnalis.

The general appearance of C. stagnalis differs slightly depending on whether the plant being viewed was submerged or floating. Both exhibit long stems that vary in length from approximately 1 to 3 decimeters. These stems give rise to leaves that are oppositely arranged. The characteristic difference between the submerged and floating C. stagnalis is its leaf shape. Submerged leaves of C. stagnalis are linear, appearing long and thin with one vein running up the center. Floating leaves of C. stagnalis, however, may be spatulate to obovate in shape, which appear much wider that the typical submerged leaves, and contain a much larger number of veins (5-7). Growth of the leaves of C. stagnalis also differs depending on whether they are submerged or floating. Submerged leaves can grow 4 to 10 mm in length whereas floating leaves may only reach 2 mm in length. Submerged leaves are typically thin but may be wider in some cases making it harder to differentiate them from their floating counterparts which may grow 5 to 8 mm in width.

=== Reproductive structure ===
Callitriche stagnalis is a monoecious plant, having both female and male reproductive structures. C. stagnalis staminate and pistillate flowers contain the stamen (male reproductive organ that fertilizes via pollen) and the pistil (female reproductive organ), respectively. Small distances between flower types of C. stagnalis promotes aerial self-pollination. Another structural feature that may aid pollination are the two distinct bracts located at the base of each flower. These small bracts aid in keeping the flowers above water. C. stagnalis produces fruit that is suborbicular in shape. This fruit varies in thickness from 1.5 to 2 mm and is composed of multiple thin, winged margin mericarps.

== Dispersal mechanism ==
Clonal spread and prolific seed production are two strategies promoting the distribution of C. stagnalis. Because this species is able to perform self pollination, it is able to achieve greater seed production assisting dispersal. Seeds may also be further spread to distant areas by vectors such as bird, boats, and tires. This species has also been known to spread through plant fragmentation. The ability of C. stagnalis to reproduce via clonal spread aids in this species invasiveness and subsequent threat to native vegetation.

== Habitat ==
Callitriche stagnalis is normally found in aquatic environments particularly in which there is little to no motion. C. stagnalis frequents lakes, ponds, salt marshes, and slow moving rivers and streams. This species is able to thrive in both fresh and brackish water habitats.

== Distribution world-wide ==
Callitriche stagnalis is native to both Europe and North Africa, where it is widespread in aquatic and subaquatic habitats. Currently C. stagnalis has been found in Europe, Northern Africa, The United States, Asia, Australia, New Caledonia, and New Zealand.

=== Introduction to the United States ===
The earliest record of C. stagnalis in North America comes from New York and New Jersey in 1861. And, it was first found on the West Coast in 1871 in Oregon. Though the exact mechanism of its introduction is unclear, its existence suggests that it may have been accidentally released through shipping. By the end of the nineteenth century, it had become a popular aquarium plant, this is believed to be the reason why the invasion is not only focused on the coasts of the United States and has been able to enter inland states.

Callitriche stagnalis is found in all of the mid-Atlantic states (New York, New Jersey, Pennsylvania, Maryland, Delaware and West Virginia), Virginia, Tennessee, Alabama, Wisconsin, Montana, Washington, Oregon and California. In New England, it has been reported in Massachusetts, Connecticut and Maine.

=== Invasive threat ===
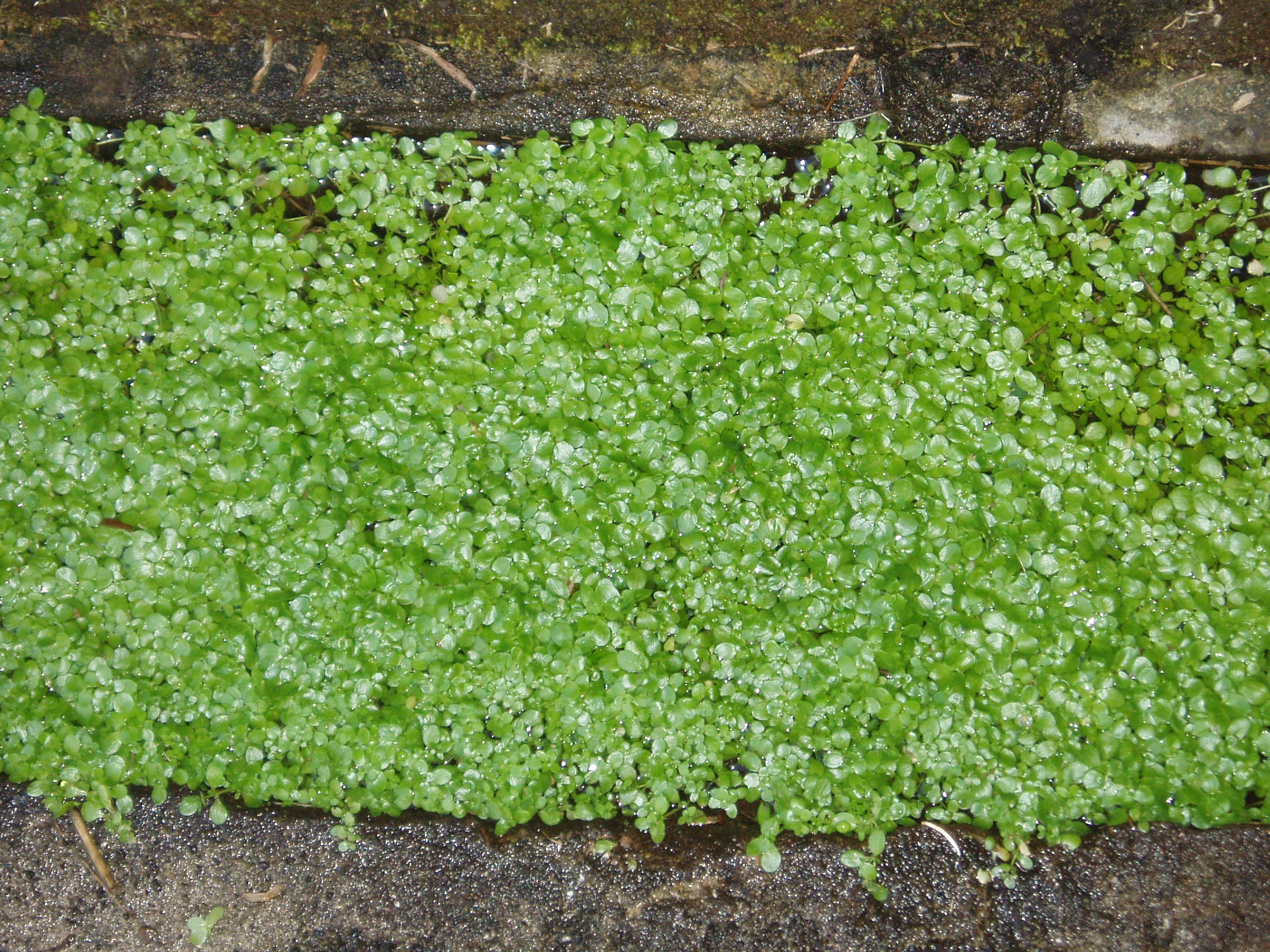
Dense vegetative mat of C. stagnalis.

Although this species does not pose a threat to humans, it has the potential to threaten native and other local vegetation. Due to this species ability to reproduce by clonal spread, C. stagnalis can form thick and locally dense vegetative mats which can crowd out other vegetation by taking up limited space and nutrients in the environment.
