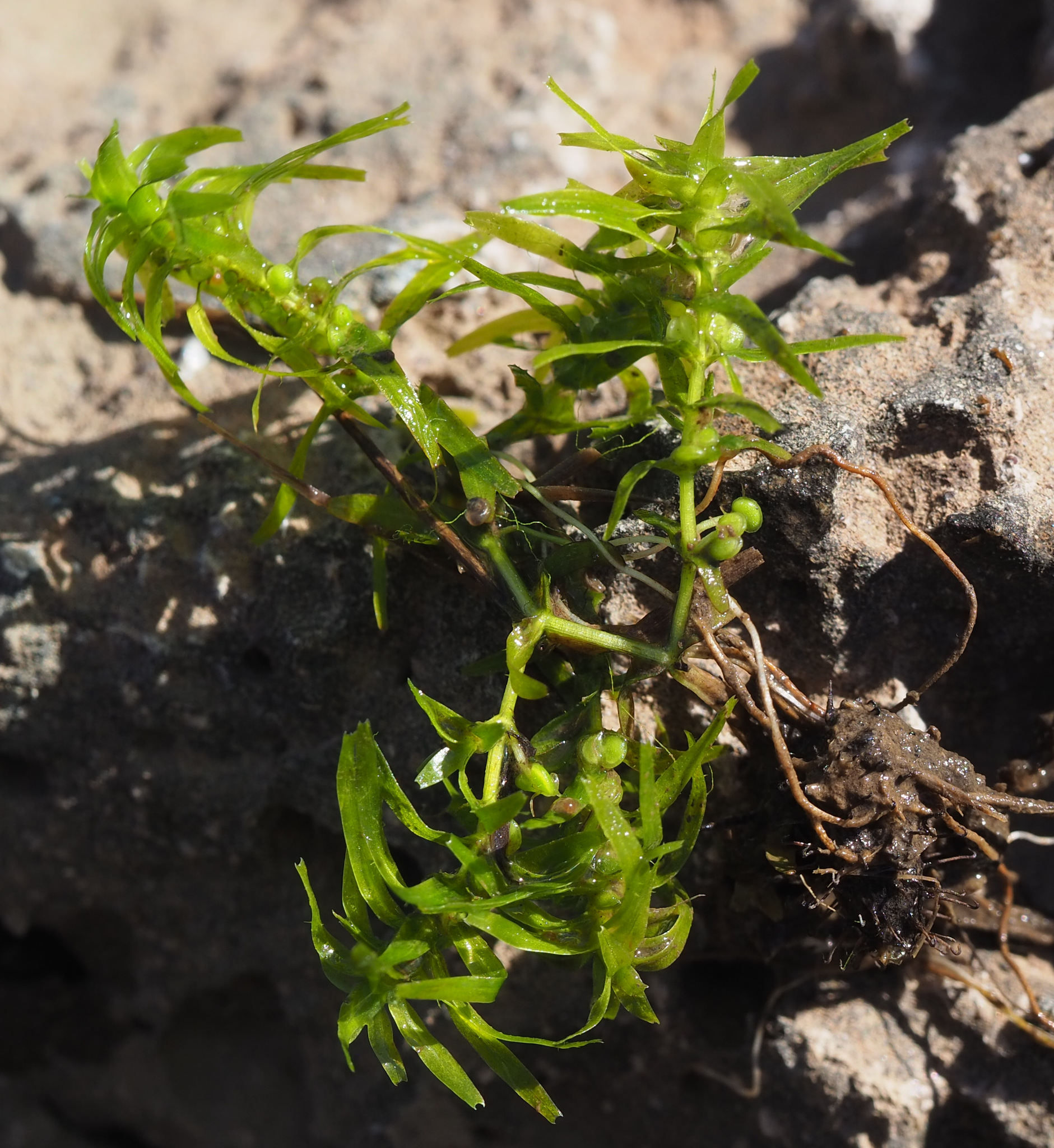

Conservation status
- Least Concern (IUCN 3.1)

Scientific classification
- Kingdom: Plantae
- Clade: Tracheophytes
- Clade: Angiosperms
- Clade: Eudicots
- Clade: Asterids
- Order: Lamiales
- Family: Plantaginaceae
- Genus: Callitriche
- Species: C. truncata

Binomial name
- Callitriche truncata Guss. (1826)

Synonyms
- Callitriche aquatica subsp. truncata (Guss.) Bonnier (1921); Callitriche autumnalis subsp. truncata (Guss.) Arcang. (1882); Callitriche hermaphroditica subsp. truncata (Guss.) Jahand. & Maire (1932); Callitriche palustris var. truncata (Guss.) Fiori (1926)

= Callitriche truncata =

Species of plant

Callitriche truncata, the short leaved water starwort, is a species of plant in the family Plantaginaceae. It is an aquatic subshrub native to the Mediterranean Basin countries of southern Europe from Spain to Greece and of North Africa from Morocco to Libya, as well as Turkey, Lebanon, and Syria in the eastern Mediterranean, Belgium, the Netherlands, Great Britain, and Ireland in western Europe, eastern European Russia, and the western Himalayas.

They have a self-supporting growth form and simple, broad leaves. Individuals can grow to 10 cm tall.

== Sources ==
This article incorporates text from a free content work. Licensed under CC0 (license statement/permission). Text taken from Callitriche truncata. Encyclopedia of Life.
