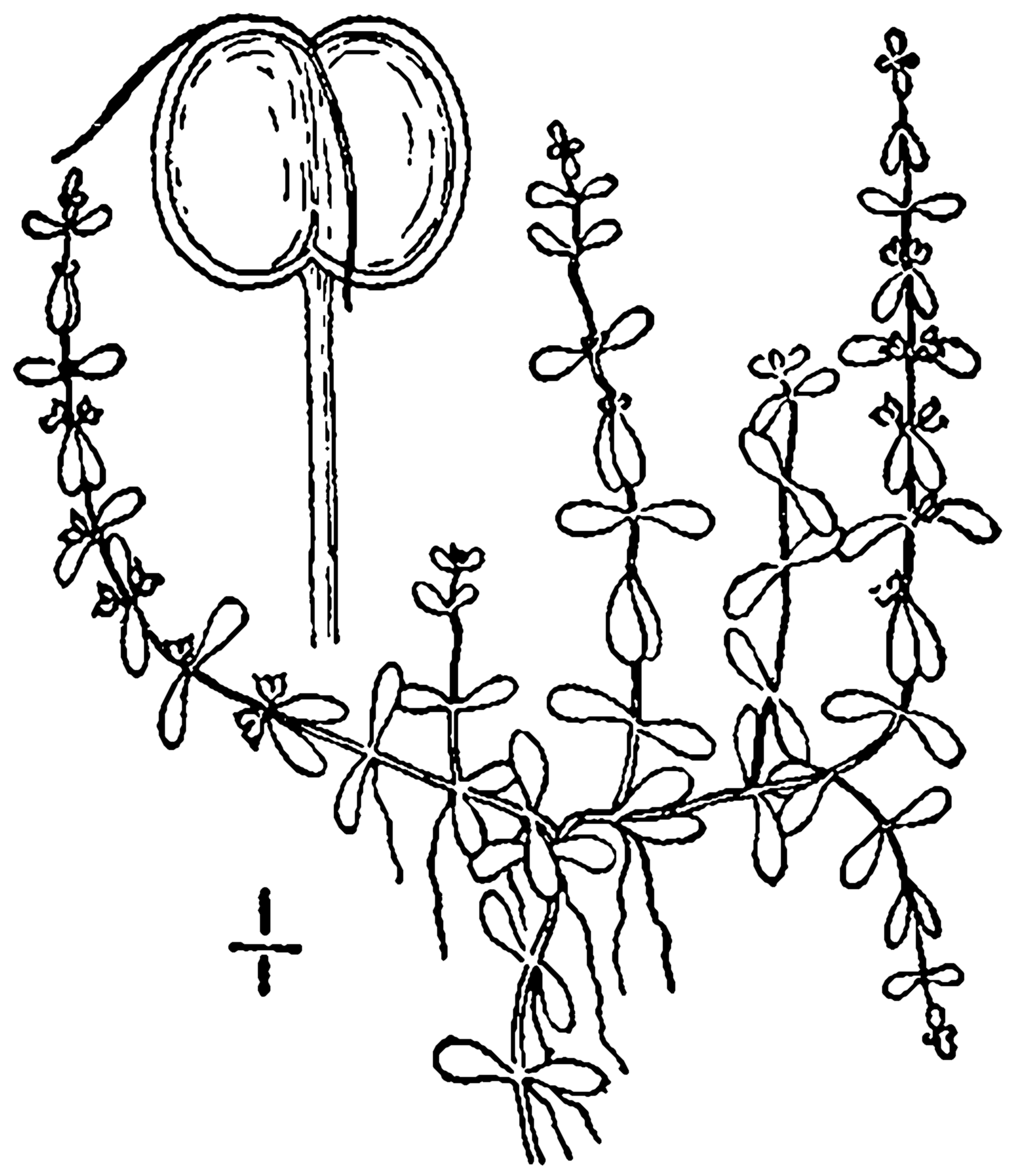

Scientific classification
- Kingdom: Plantae
- Clade: Tracheophytes
- Clade: Angiosperms
- Clade: Eudicots
- Clade: Asterids
- Order: Lamiales
- Family: Plantaginaceae
- Genus: Callitriche
- Species: C. terrestris

Binomial name
- Callitriche terrestris Raf.

= Callitriche terrestris =

Species of aquatic plant

Callitriche terrestris is a species of plant in the family Plantaginaceae found in Canada and in the eastern United States.
