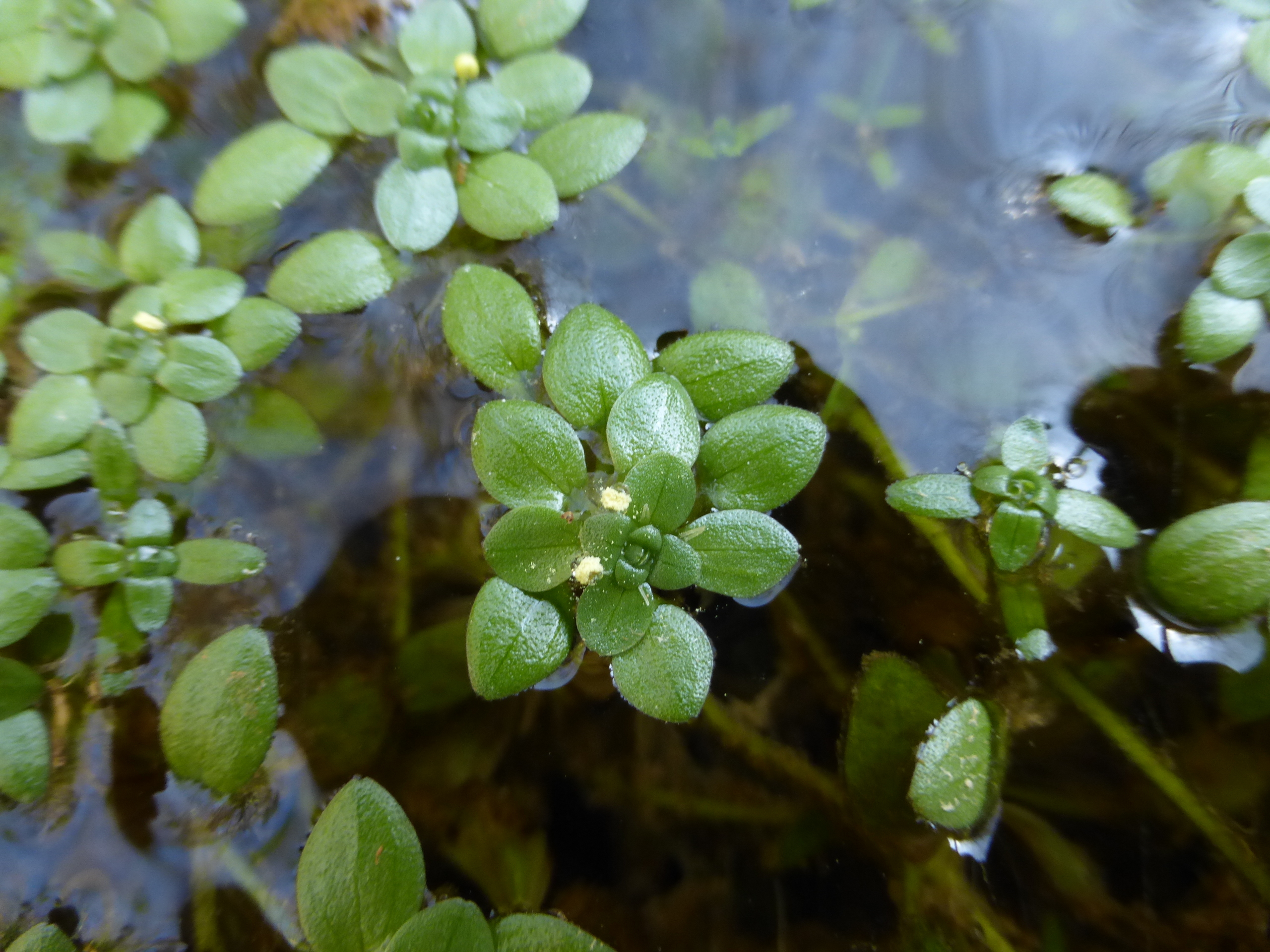

Scientific classification
- Kingdom: Plantae
- Clade: Tracheophytes
- Clade: Angiosperms
- Clade: Eudicots
- Clade: Asterids
- Order: Lamiales
- Family: Plantaginaceae
- Genus: Callitriche
- Species: C. brutia

Binomial name
- Callitriche brutia Petagna (1787)

= Callitriche brutia =

Species of aquatic plant

Callitriche brutia, the pedunculate water-starwort, is a dwarf amphibious annual or perennial dicotyledon herb in the genus Callitriche. The common name of this species is water starwort. It colonizes aquatic environments, such as wetlands, lakes, rivers, streams, and pools, and it grows in oligotrophic conditions, meaning it grows in an environment that has little to sustain life. Pedunculate water-starwort was found in Ireland and England, but is now an invasive species due to its resistance to environmental stressors, and its ability to grow in still water.

== Description ==
Callitriche brutia is a long plant that can be seen with many rounded leaves across its stem. It has a bundle of leaves at the top, in a flower-like shape. It can often be seen growing in large amounts in a single area. It often grows directly in water, or very damp areas.

== Distribution and habitat ==
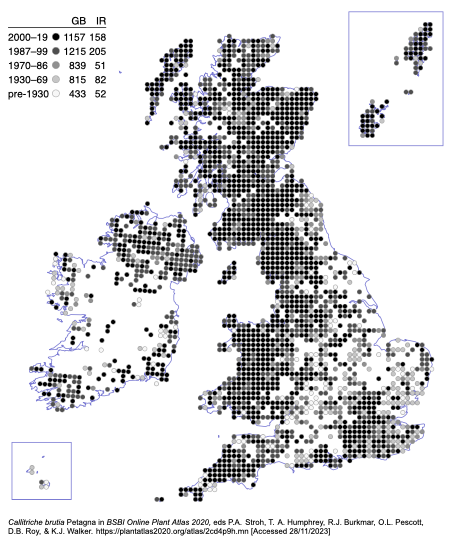
Distribution map of Callitriche brutia in the British Isles

The habitats ranges from ephemeral pools, lakes and canals to fast-flowing upland rivers Europe-wide. This species can be found in ditches, ponds, wetlands, and in shallow waters of lake margins and drains. The Callitriche bruita is most abundant in the upland regions of Britain and Ireland, as well as areas in the New Forest (South Hampshire) and the Lizard Peninsula (West Cornwall).

== Phytoremediation ==
Callitriche brutia is known to use rhizofiltration during phytoremediation. Rhizofiltration is a type of phytoremediation in which excess nutrients or toxic substances are filtered out of waste water, surface water, and contaminated groundwater using a mass of roots.

High concentrations, about 523 mg/kg, of arsenic (As) are found submerged in Callitriche brutia. A common metalloid in nature, arsenic (As) can be found in rocks and minerals, soils, natural waters, the atmosphere, and organisms. Arsenic can exist in the environment in a range of chemical forms with varying levels of toxicity, mobility, and bioavailability.

Similar species, such as Callitriche lusitanica and Callitriche stagnalis, have arsenic (As) and uranium (U) phytoremediators.

== Life cycle ==
Pendunculate water-starwort is an annual and perennial plant. Annual plants germinate, flower, reproduce, and die in one season, whereas perennial plants grow for many years. The Callitriche brutia reproduces asexually and sexually. Asexually, the plants break apart, and grow whole new plants out of the broken fragments. This kind of asexual reproduction is called fragmentation. Sexually, the plants reproduce via pollination of the male stamen and fertilization of the female pistil, in which it will produce a zygote.

== Leaf development ==
Callitriche brutia is an aquatic herb. They have complex-whorled leaves, and do not have petioles. This species has linear veins on its leaves, and has thick stems. They are smooth and hairless.

Callitriche brutia flower in May, June, July, August, and September. The flowers appear green with no petals.
