= Callitriche christensenii =

Conservation status
- Least Concern (IUCN 3.1)

Scientific classification
- Kingdom: Plantae
- Clade: Tracheophytes
- Clade: Angiosperms
- Clade: Eudicots
- Clade: Asterids
- Order: Lamiales
- Family: Plantaginaceae
- Genus: Callitriche
- Species: C. christensenii

Binomial name
- Callitriche christensenii Christoph.

Species of aquatic plant

Callitriche christensenii is a species of plant in the family Plantaginaceae. It is a hydrosubshrub endemic to Tristan da Cunha. Its natural habitats are rivers, freshwater marshes, and freshwater springs.
