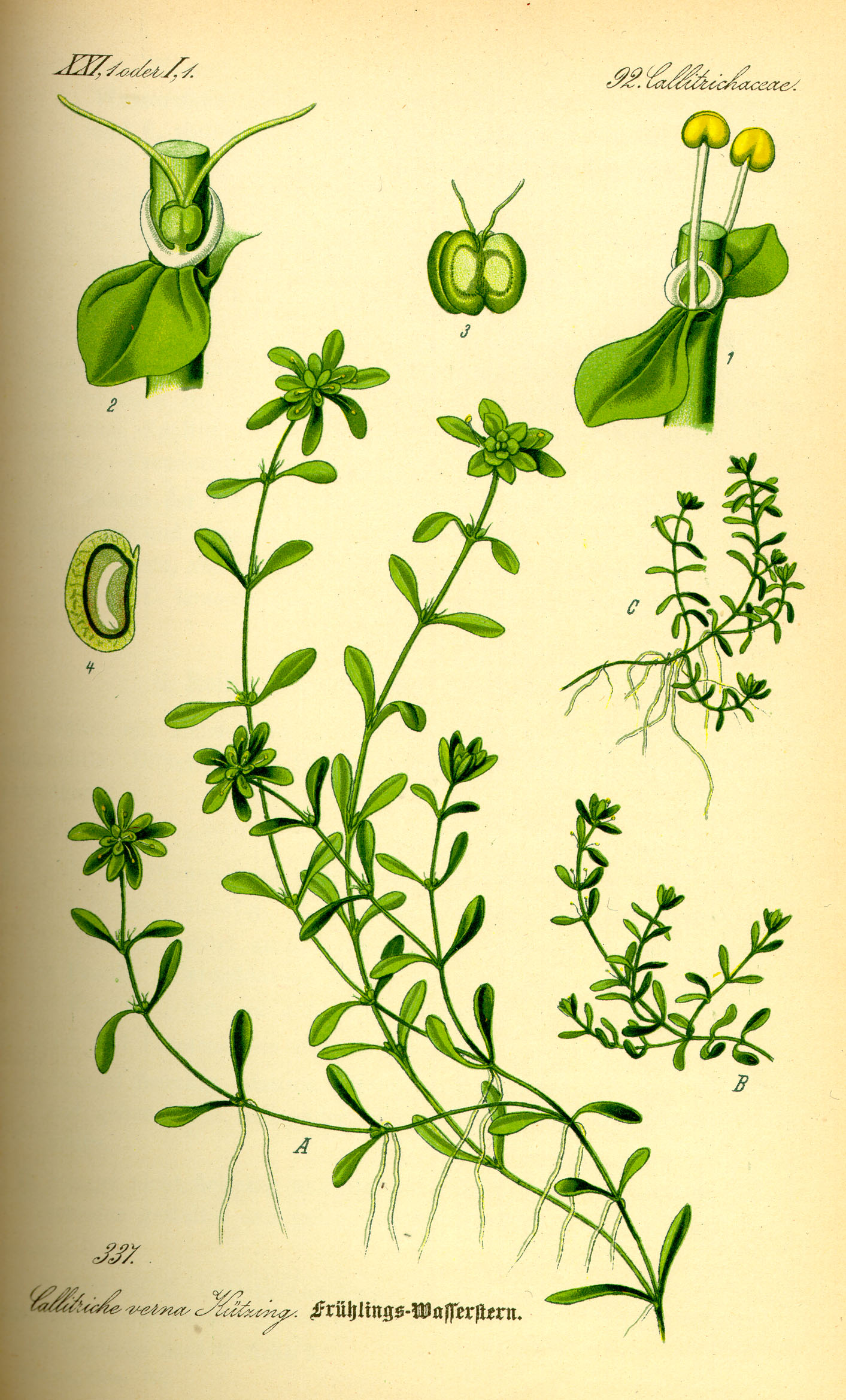
- Water-starwort (Callitriche palustris) from Thomé; Flora von Deutschland, Österreich und der Schweiz 1885

Scientific classification
- Kingdom: Plantae
- Clade: Tracheophytes
- Clade: Angiosperms
- Clade: Eudicots
- Clade: Asterids
- Order: Lamiales
- Family: Plantaginaceae
- Tribe: Callitricheae
- Genus: Callitriche; L. (1753)

Species
- 75; see text

Synonyms
- Stellaria Ség. (1754), nom. illeg.; Stellina Bubani (1897), nom. superfl.

= Callitriche =

Genus of aquatic plants

Callitriche is a genus of largely aquatic plants known as water-starwort. Previously, it was the only genus in the family Callitrichaceae. However, according to the APG II system this family is now included in the Plantaginaceae (plantain family). The family name Callitrichaceae retains its status as nomen conservandum (name to be retained).

== Species ==
75 species are accepted.

- Callitriche alata A.I.Baranov & Skvortsov
- Callitriche albomarginata Fassett
- Callitriche anisoptera Schotsman
- Callitriche antarctica Engelm. ex Hegelm. – Antarctic water-starwort
- Callitriche aucklandica R.Mason
- Callitriche berteroana (Hegelm.) Lansdown & Hassemer
- Callitriche brachycarpa Hegelm.
- Callitriche brevistyla Lansdown
- Callitriche brutia Petagna – pedunculate water starwort
- Callitriche capricorni R.Mason
- Callitriche chathamensis (R.Mason) Lansdown
- Callitriche christensenii Christoph.
- Callitriche ciliata Lansdown & Hassemer
- Callitriche compressa N.E.Br.
- Callitriche concinna Lansdown & Hassemer
- Callitriche cophocarpa Sendtn.
- Callitriche cribrosa Schotsman
- Callitriche cyclocarpa Hegelm.
- Callitriche cycloptera Schotsman
- Callitriche dacryoidea Lansdown & Hassemer
- Callitriche deflexa A.Braun ex Hegelm.
- Callitriche ecarinata Lansdown & Hassemer
- Callitriche fassetti Schotsman – Fassett's water starwort
- Callitriche favargera Schotsman
- Callitriche fehmedianii Majeed Kak & Javeid
- Callitriche fuliginea Lansdown
- Callitriche fuscicarpa Lansdown
- Callitriche glareosa Lansdown
- Callitriche hamulata Kütz. ex W.D.J.Koch – intermediate water starwort
- Callitriche hedbergiorum Schotsman
- Callitriche hegelmaieriana Lansdown & Hassemer
- Callitriche hermaphroditica L. (synonym C. autumnalis L.) – autumn water starwort
- Callitriche heterophylla Pursh (synonyms C. anceps Fernald and C. bollanderi Hegelm.) – twoheaded water starwort
- Callitriche insularis Lansdown
- Callitriche japonica Engelm. ex Hegelm. (synonym C. nana B.C.Ho & G.T.P.Vo)
- Callitriche keniensis Schotsman
- Callitriche lechleri (Hegelm.) Fassett
- Callitriche lenisulca Clavaud
- Callitriche longipedunculata Morong – longstalk water starwort
- Callitriche lusitanica Schotsman
- Callitriche mandonis Van Heurck & Müll.Arg.
- Callitriche marginata Torr. (synonym C. sepulta S.Watson) – winged water starwort
- Callitriche mathezii Schotsman
- Callitriche mouterdei Schotsman
- Callitriche muelleri Sond.
- Callitriche nubigena Fassett
- Callitriche × nyrensis Prančl
- Callitriche oblongicarpa Fassett
- Callitriche obtusangula Le Gall – blunt-fruited water starwort
- Callitriche occidentalis Hegelm.
- Callitriche oreophila Schotsman
- Callitriche palustris L. – spiny water starwort
- Callitriche papuana Merr. & L.M.Perry
- Callitriche pedunculosa L. (synonym C. nuttallii Torr.) – Nuttall's water starwort
- Callitriche peploides Nutt. – matted water starwort
- Callitriche petrieri R.Mason
- Callitriche platycarpa Kütz. – various-leaved water starwort
- Callitriche praetermissa Lansdown & Hassemer
- Callitriche pulchra Schotsman – beautiful water starwort
- Callitriche quindiensis Fassett
- Callitriche raveniana Lansdown
- Callitriche regis-jubae Schotsman
- Callitriche rimosa Fassett
- Callitriche schotsmaniana Lansdown & Hassemer
- Callitriche sonderi Hegelm.
- Callitriche stagnalis Scop. – pond water starwort
- Callitriche terrestris Raf. (synonym C. austinii Engelm.) – terrestrial water starwort
- Callitriche transvolgensis Tzvelev
- Callitriche trochlearis Fassett – effluent water starwort
- Callitriche truncata Guss. – short-leaved water starwort
- Callitriche turfosa Bertero ex Hegelm.
- Callitriche umbonata Hegelm.
- Callitriche × vigens K.Martinsson
- Callitriche vulcanicola Schotsman
- Callitriche wightiana Wall. ex Wight & Arn.

== Phylogeny and evolution ==
The first molecular phylogeny of the aquatic genus of 50 species discerned three clades: Clade A (three species, widespread); Clade C (10 species, New World); Clade D (six species, Europe). The parsimony analyses revealed that aneuploid reduction (n=5 to 4) and polyploidy (n=5 to 10) have evolved at least twice in the genus, whereas the obligately submersed growth habit and hypohydrophily have evolved once.
