= Tullingesjön =

Lake in Botkyrka municipality, Sweden

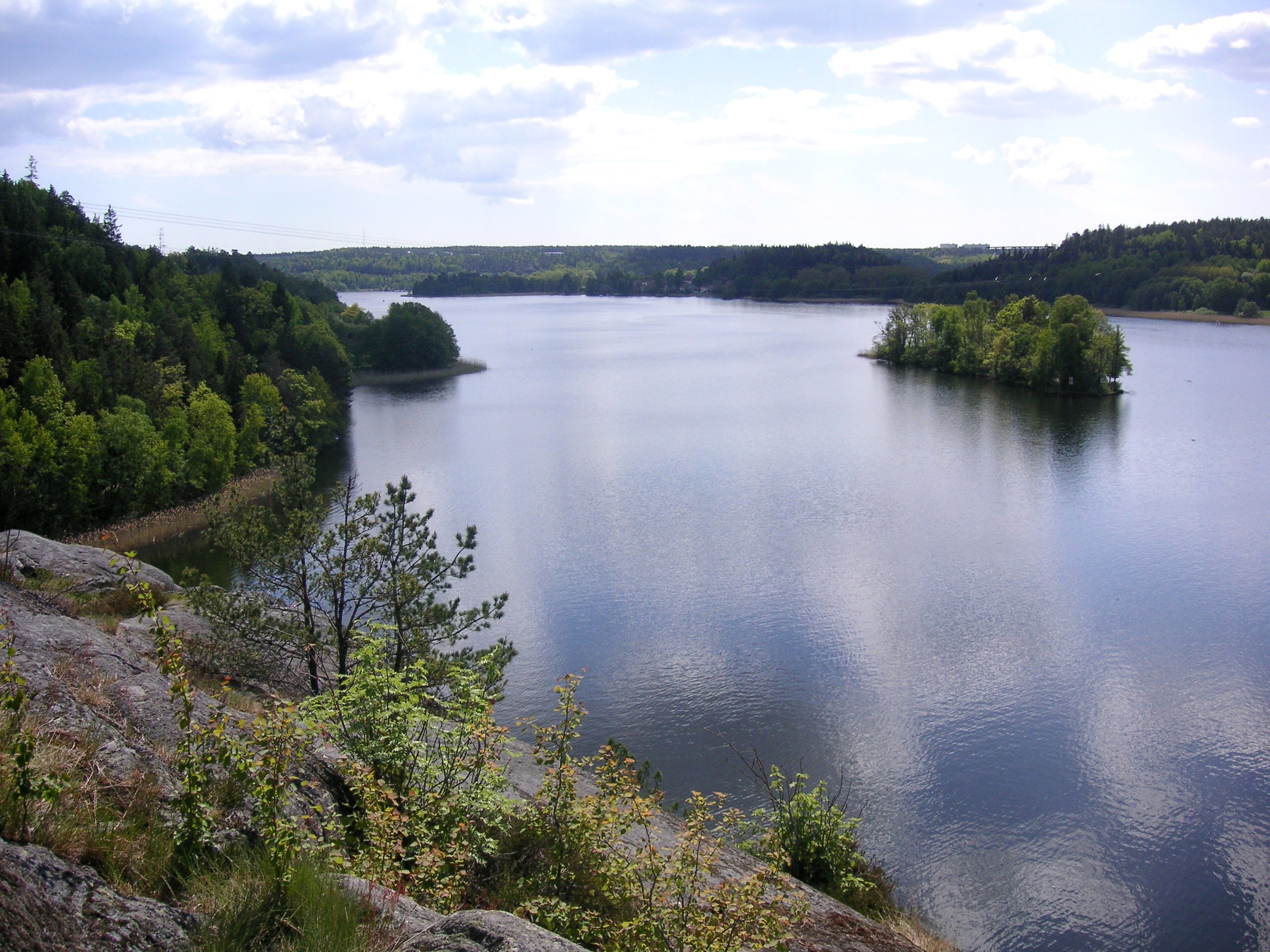
- Lake Tullingesjon in May 2008

- Location within Stockholm
- Coordinates: 59°13′N 17°52′E
- Basin countries: Sweden
- Max. length: 3.4 km (2.1 mi)

Tullingesjön is a lake in Stockholm County, Södermanland, Sweden.
