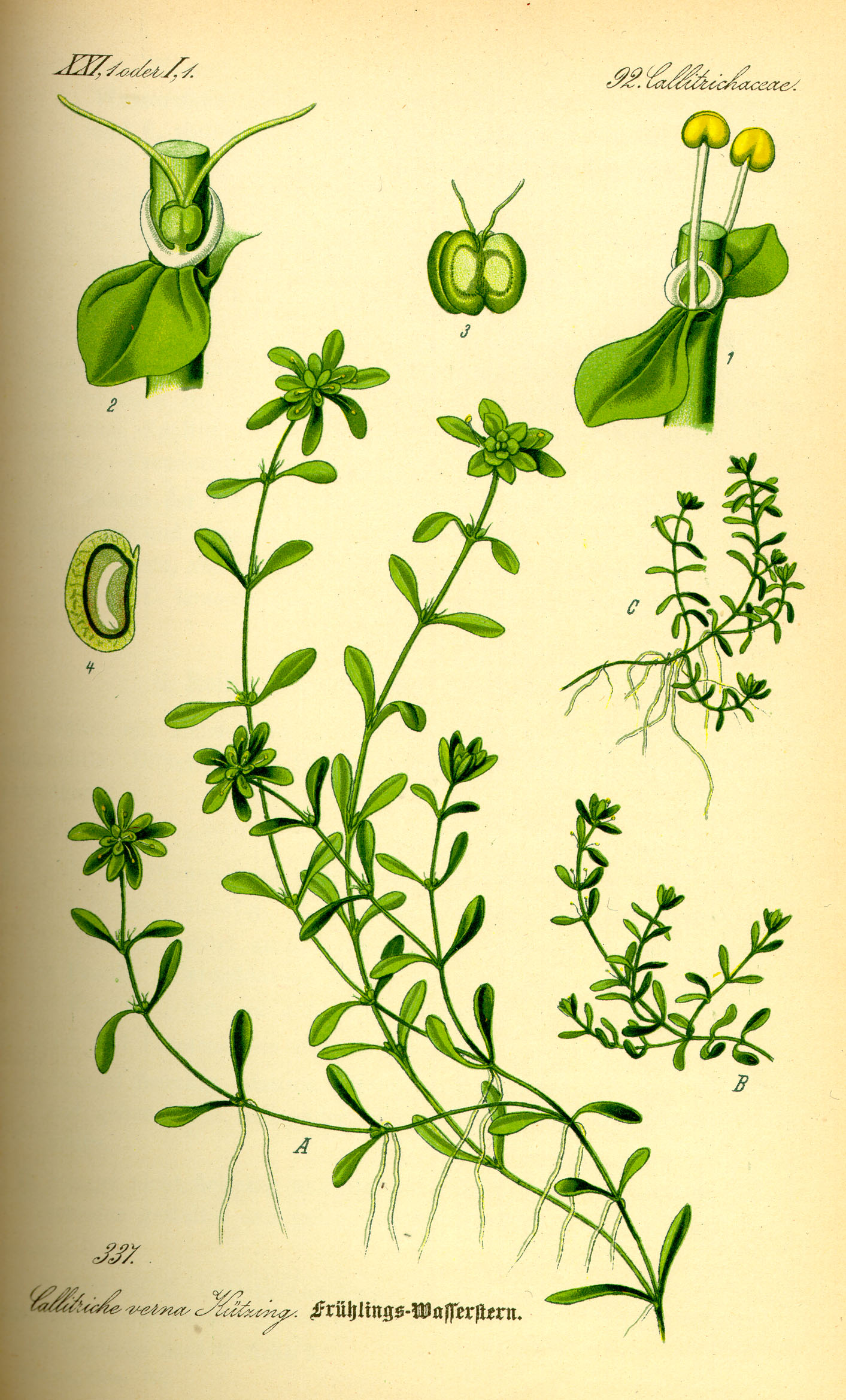
- Water-starwort (Callitriche palustris) from Thomé; Flora von Deutschland, Österreich und der Schweiz 1885

Scientific classification
- Kingdom: Plantae
- Clade: Tracheophytes
- Clade: Angiosperms
- Clade: Eudicots
- Clade: Asterids
- Order: Lamiales
- Family: Plantaginaceae
- Genus: Callitriche
- Species: C. palustris

Binomial name
- Callitriche palustris L.

Subspecies and varieties
- 6; see text

Synonyms
- List: Callitriche androgyna L.; Callitriche fontana Scop.; Callitriche minima (L.) Hoppe; Callitriche palustris var. minima L.; Callitriche sessilis var. minima (L.) Mérat; Callitriche verna var. fontana Rchb.; Callitriche verna f. fontana Soó; Callitriche verna var. leptophylla Wimm. & Grab.; Callitriche verna subvar. minima (L.) Nyman; Callitriche verna var. minima (L.) Hartm.; Callitriche verna f. minima (L.) Beger; Callitriche vernalis var. minima (L.) Lange; Stellaria palustris (L.) Kuntze; Stellaria palustris f. minima (L.) Kuntze

= Callitriche palustris =

Aquatic plant species in the veronica family

Callitriche palustris, the vernal water-starwort, narrow-fruited water-starwort, or spiny water starwort, is a species of aquatic plants. It is the type species of its genus.

It is native to temperate and subtropical North America and Eurasia, as well as Sumatra and Borneo.

== Taxonomy ==
Callitriche palustris was given its scientific name in 1753 by Carl Linnaeus. It is classified in the genus Callitriche within the wider family Plantaginaceae.

=== Subspecies and varieties ===
There is one subspecies and five accepted varieties.

- Callitriche palustris var. elegans (Petrov) Y.L.Chang – southeastern and northeastern China, Japan, Sakhalin, and East European Russia. It was classified as a variety in 1977 by Yui Liang Chang.
- Callitriche palustris var. megalata Lansdown – Russian Far East (Primorye). It was described in 2006 by Richard V. Lansdown.
- Callitriche palustris var. oryzetorum (Petrov) Lansdown – southern China, Taiwan, Japan, and western Himalayas. It was changed to a variety in 2006 by Lansdown.
- Callitriche palustris subsp. palustris – North America (except the southeastern US and Central America) and temperate Eurasia
- Callitriche palustris var. strumosa Lansdown – Borneo and Sumatra. It was also described in 2006 by Lansdown.
- Callitriche palustris subsp. subanceps (Petrov) Kuvaev – eastern Siberia and Russian Far East. Like the varieties, it was reduced to a subspecies in 2006, but by Vladimir Borisovich Kuvaev.

There are 89 synonyms of the species or three of its varieties and the accepted subspecies, 29 of them are species names.

Table of Synonyms
Name	Year	Rank	Synonym of:	Notes
Callitriche alpina Schur	1858	species	var. palustris	= het.
Callitriche androgyna L.	1755	species	C. palustris	≡ hom., nom. illeg.
Callitriche angustifolia Hoppe	1792	species	var. palustris	= het.
Callitriche aquatica Huds.	1778	species	var. palustris	= het.
Callitriche bengalensis Petrov	1928	species	var. elegans	= het.
Callitriche bifida (L.) Morong	1894	species	var. palustris	= het.
Callitriche cespitosa Schultz	1806	species	var. palustris	= het.
Callitriche cuneifolia A.Braun ex Hegelm.	1867	species	var. palustris	= het.
Callitriche elegans Petrov	1928	species	var. elegans	≡ hom.
Callitriche euverna Syme	1868	species	var. palustris	= het.
Callitriche fallax Petrov	1928	species	var. palustris	= het.
Callitriche fissa Lej.	1825	species	var. palustris	= het.
Callitriche fontana Scop.	1771	species	C. palustris	≡ hom., nom. superfl.
Callitriche intermedia Hoppe	1792	species	var. palustris	= het., nom. illeg.
Callitriche latifolia Gilib.	1792	species	var. palustris	= het., opus utique oppr.
Callitriche minima (L.) Hoppe	1792	species	C. palustris	≡ hom.
Callitriche oryzetorum Petrov	1928	species	var. oryzetorum	≡ hom.
Callitriche pallens Goldb.	1817	species	var. palustris	= het.
Callitriche stellata Hoppe	1792	species	var. palustris	= het.
Callitriche stenocarpa Hegelm.	1868	species	var. palustris	= het.
Callitriche subanceps Petrov	1928	species	subsp. subanceps	≡ hom.
Callitriche tenuifolia Thuill. ex Pers.	1805	species	var. palustris	= het.
Callitriche verna L.	1755	species	var. palustris	= het.
Callitriche vernalis W.D.J.Koch	1836	species	var. palustris	= het., nom. illeg.
Callitriche vernalis Kütz.	1832	species	var. palustris	= het.
Elatine alata Rostk. & Schmidt	1824	species	var. palustris	= het.
Stellaria bifida (L.) Kuntze	1898	species	var. palustris	= het.
Stellaria palustris (L.) Kuntze	1898	species	C. palustris	≡ hom., nom. illeg.
Stellaria verna (L.) F.H.Wigg.	1780	species	var. palustris	= het.
Notes: ≡ homotypic synonym; = heterotypic synonym
