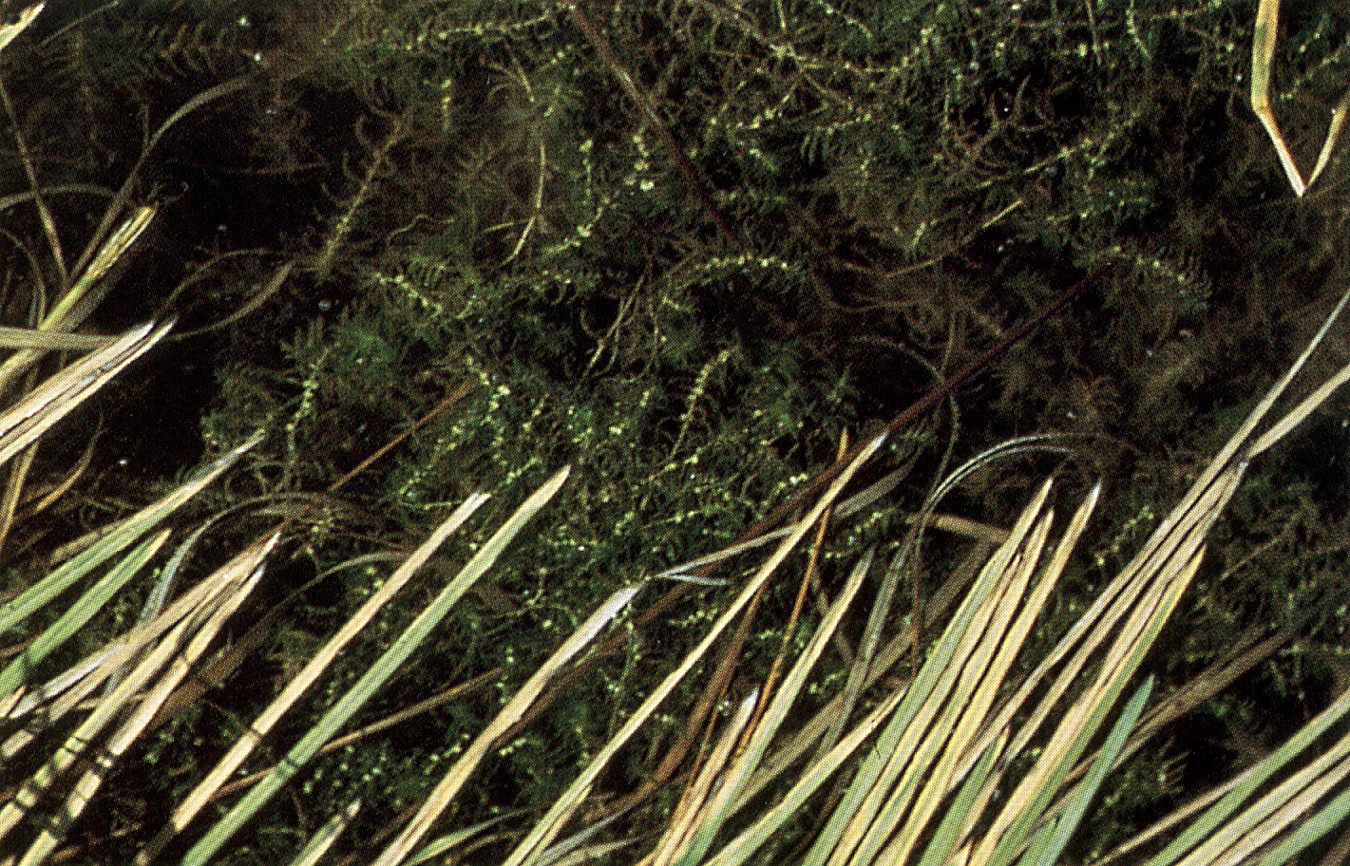

Conservation status
- Secure (NatureServe)

Scientific classification
- Kingdom: Plantae
- Clade: Tracheophytes
- Clade: Angiosperms
- Clade: Eudicots
- Clade: Asterids
- Order: Lamiales
- Family: Plantaginaceae
- Genus: Callitriche
- Species: C. hermaphroditica

Binomial name
- Callitriche hermaphroditica L.

Subspecies
- C. h. subsp. exalata; C. h. subsp. hermaphroditica; C. h. subsp. macrocarpa

Synonyms
- Callitriche autumnalis

= Callitriche hermaphroditica =

Aquatic plant species in the veronica family

Callitriche hermaphroditica (vernacular name: autumnal water-starwort) is a species of flowering plant belonging to the family Plantaginaceae.

Its native range is Subarctic and Temperate Northern Hemisphere.

== Taxonomy ==
Callitriche hermaphroditica was given its scientific name in 1755 by Carl Linnaeus. It is classified in the genus Callitriche within the family Plantaginaceae and has three accepted subspecies.

- Callitriche hermaphroditica subsp. exalata
  This subspecies is only found in northwestern Russia.
- Callitriche hermaphroditica subsp. hermaphroditica
  This subspecies is the most widespread and is native to North America, Europe, and Asia.
- Callitriche hermaphroditica subsp. macrocarpa
  This subspecies is widely, but not continuously distributed being found in Alaska, Oregon, Greenland, Iceland, the British Isles, Scandenavia, and the Himalayas.

Callitriche hermaphroditica has 19 synonyms of the species or one of its three subspecies.

Table of Synonyms
Name	Year	Rank	Synonym of:	Notes
Callitriche angustifolia Gilib.	1792	species	subsp. hermaphroditica	= het., opus utique oppr.
Callitriche aquatica subsp. autumnalis Bonnier	1921	subspecies	C. hermaphroditica	≡ hom.
Callitriche autumnalis L.	1755	species	C. hermaphroditica	≡ hom., nom. illeg.
Callitriche autumnalis var. linearis (Pursh) A.Gray	1862	variety	subsp. hermaphroditica	= het.
Callitriche autumnalis f. linnei Kütz.	1831	form	subsp. hermaphroditica	= het.
Callitriche autumnalis f. macrocarpa Hegelm.	1867	form	subsp. macrocarpa	≡ hom.
Callitriche confervoides Thuill. ex Link	1820	species	subsp. hermaphroditica	= het.
Callitriche decussata Link	1820	species	subsp. hermaphroditica	= het.
Callitriche euautumnalis Syme	1868	species	subsp. hermaphroditica	= het.
Callitriche exalata (Tzvelev) Tzvelev	2000	species	subsp. exalata	≡ hom.
Callitriche foliosa Raf.	1808	species	subsp. hermaphroditica	= het., nom. utique rej.
Callitriche glomerata Thuill. ex Link	1820	species	subsp. hermaphroditica	= het.
Callitriche linearis Pursh	1813	species	subsp. hermaphroditica	= het.
Callitriche sessilis DC.	1805	species	subsp. hermaphroditica	= het.
Callitriche sessilis var. autumnalis Mérat	1813	variety	C. hermaphroditica	≡ hom., nom. superfl.
Callitriche sessilis var. confervoides Mérat	1812	variety	subsp. hermaphroditica	= het.
Callitriche stellaria Raf.	1811	species	subsp. hermaphroditica	= het.
Callitriche virens Goldb.	1817	species	subsp. hermaphroditica	= het.
Stellaria autumnalis F.H.Wigg.	1780	species	subsp. hermaphroditica	= het.
Notes: ≡ homotypic synonym; = heterotypic synonym
