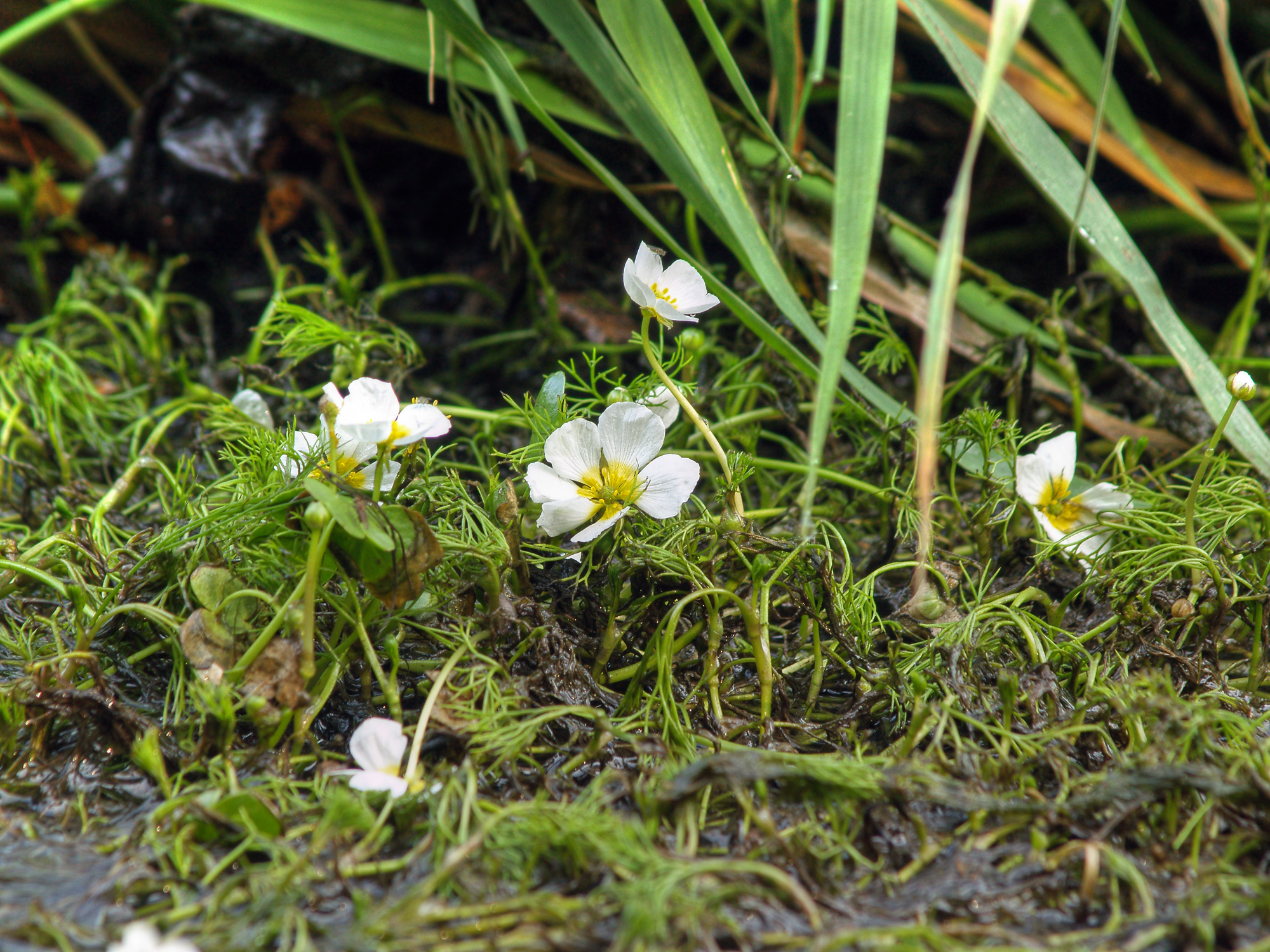

Scientific classification
- Kingdom: Plantae
- Clade: Tracheophytes
- Clade: Angiosperms
- Clade: Eudicots
- Order: Ranunculales
- Family: Ranunculaceae
- Genus: Ranunculus
- Species: R. circinatus

Binomial name
- Ranunculus circinatus Sibth.

Synonyms
- Batrachium circinatum (Sibth.) Spach

= Ranunculus circinatus =

Species of flowering plant

Ranunculus circinatus is a species of flowering plant belonging to the family Ranunculaceae.

Its native range is Europe to Central Asia.
