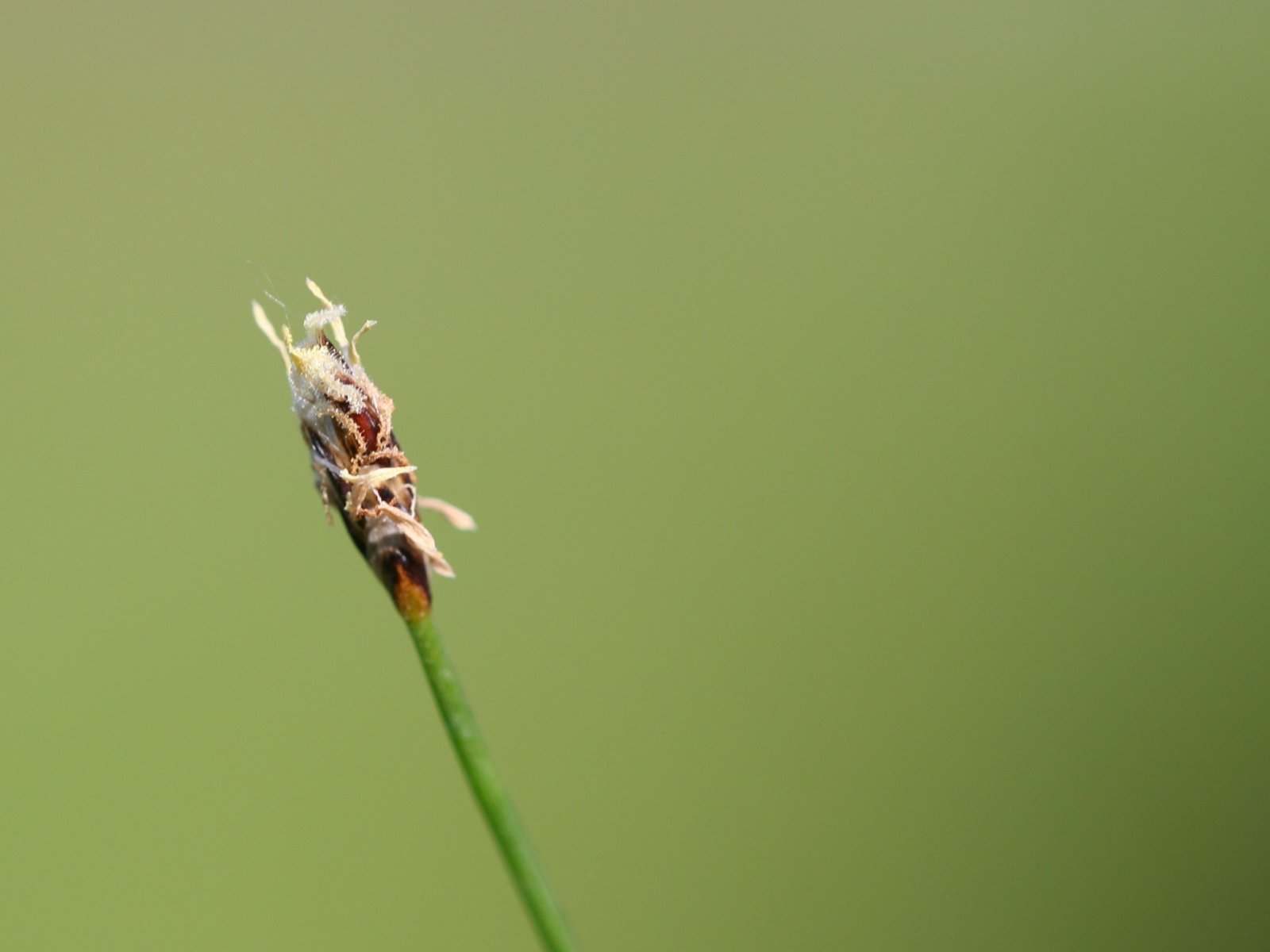

Scientific classification
- Kingdom: Plantae
- Clade: Tracheophytes
- Clade: Angiosperms
- Clade: Monocots
- Clade: Commelinids
- Order: Poales
- Family: Cyperaceae
- Genus: Eleocharis
- Species: E. acicularis

Binomial name
- Eleocharis acicularis (L.) Roem. & Schult.

Synonyms
- Baeothryon trichoides (Kunth) A.Dietr.; Chaetocyperus acicularis (L.) Nees; Chaetocyperus trichodes (Muhl.) Steud.; Clavula acicularis (L.) Dumort.; Cyperus acicularis (L.) With.; Eleocharis atricha Benth. nom. illeg.; Eleocharis chaetaria Hance nom. illeg.; Eleocharis comosa K.Richt.; Eleocharis costata J.Presl & C.Presl; Eleocharis nervata Svenson; Eleocharis triangularis Reinsch; Eleocharis trichoides (Kunth) Kuntze; Eleogiton exigua A.Dietr.; Isolepis acicularis (L.) Schltdl.; Isolepis exigua Hook. & Arn.; Isolepis longifolia Steud.; Isolepis uliginosa Steud.; Limnochloa acicularis (L.) Rchb.; Limnochloa costulata Nees ex Kunth nom. inval.; Mariscus acicularis (L.) Moench; Scirpidium aciculare (L.) Nees; Scirpus acicularis L.; Scirpus chaeta Schult.; Scirpus polymorphus Salzm. ex Steud.; Scirpus pusillus Kunth; Scirpus trichodes Muhl.; Scirpus trichoides Kunth; Scirpus uliginosus K.Koch nom. illeg.; Trichophyllum aciculare (L.) House

= Eleocharis acicularis =

Needle spikerush

Species of grass-like plant

Eleocharis acicularis is a species of spikesedge known by the common names needle spikerush and least spikerush. It is widespread across Europe, central and southeastern Asia, North America and northeastern South America as far south as Ecuador. It is also found in Australia, where it is probably an introduced species.

Eleocharis acicularis is an annual or perennial spikesedge with long, grasslike stems to about 15 centimeters (6 inches) in height, shorter in bog conditions, from a creeping rhizome. In shallow water it will form short spikes of tiny flowers amongst flat overlapping bracts. The tiny flowers are less than five millimeters in diameter and are borne at the tip of each stem in single, sharply pointed, lanceoloid spikelets up to about six millimeters long. This is a plant of marshes, vernal pools, and bogs.

Eleocharis acicularis is sold commercially as an aquascape plant suitable for inclusion in artificial aquatic environments. It thrives with plenty of light and a high concentration of carbon dioxide.

The specific epithet, acicularis, is derived from Latin and means "needle-shaped".

== Varieties ==
Two varieties are recognized:

- Eleocharis acicularis var. acicularis – most of species range
- Eleocharis acicularis var. porcata S.G.Sm. – western North America from Alberta south to New Mexico and Louisiana
