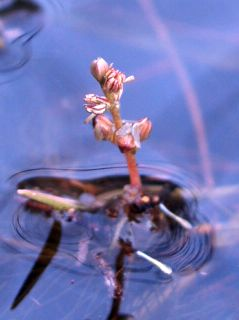

Scientific classification
- Kingdom: Plantae
- Clade: Tracheophytes
- Clade: Angiosperms
- Clade: Eudicots
- Order: Saxifragales
- Family: Haloragaceae
- Genus: Myriophyllum
- Species: M. alterniflorum

Binomial name
- Myriophyllum alterniflorum DC.

= Myriophyllum alterniflorum =

Species of flowering plant

Myriophyllum alterniflorum, known as alternate water-milfoil or alternateflower watermilfoil, is a species of water-milfoil. It is native to Europe and Asia, has been introduced to North America and inhabits aquatic habitat, such as ponds and streams.

== Description ==
M. alterniflorum is an aquatic plant that stands approximately 4 feet (1.2 m) tall with stems that range from 1 to 4 feet (0.3 to 1.2 m) long. Stems are often submerged in murky or clear water. M. alterniflorum leaves are found both submerged and above water, with leaf location influencing their physical characteristics. Their leaves have blade lengths of 3–22 mm (0.12–0.87 in) with emergent leaves being smaller than those submerged. All leaves exhibit a whorled habit, with 3 or more leaves per node. Leaves are commonly located at eight nodes along each stem, are typically red and green, and rarely brown. The flowers on this plant are found above the water, with attached fruit. Each of these fruit that are found in this section are 1.5 mm in length. These fruits then dry and split apart when they are finally ripened. The flowers themselves tend to be more perennial meaning that they bloom three or more growing seasons, and on the smaller side. The flowers bloom in the month of August, which causes them to emerge out of the water.

== Habitat ==
M. alterniflorum is found in more shallow areas in bodies of water (e.g., rivers and lakes), in order for these plants to survive in these areas the water needs to be slow moving. The preferred type of water tends to be fresh or even brackish water (i.e., salt and freshwater mixed together). These plants tend to be cultivated in more sandy and mucky types of environments, due to the pH preference being 5.4–11 pH level. This is considered to be an alkaline environment, where the plant tends to thrive best in.

== Distribution ==
It is native to areas in Europe, mostly in France, but it can also be found in areas of North America, mainly in the states of Massachusetts, Connecticut, Maine, New Hampshire, Rhode Island, Vermont, and Canada. It is found in 48 US states, with the exception of the states of Hawaii and Wyoming. In New England, it is most commonly found in Maine, especially in habitats with slow moving bodies of water, such as rivers and lakes. In 1888, it was introduced to Mountain Lake in San Francisco, California.

== Introduction ==
The initial case of water milfoil invasion took place in the 1940s, where the plant was thought to have been transported to the United States from Europe. The initial vector is mainly being linked to trade situations such as the aquarium and aquatic nursery uses. It is assumed that the mode of transportation was through a ballast ship, making this plant abundant in high motorboat use bodies of water. Water milfoils are thought to have invaded North America through water transmission including boat, propellers, and fish gear. Decades later, the milfoil is still present and actively impacting parts of the ecosystem in several ways.

== Impact ==
M. alterniflorum has been used to control and mitigate the levels of pollution in bodies of water (lakes and rivers, or any slow moving bodies of water), mainly in the shallow portions. It was found that its presence restored natural levels of ammonia and was a more effective restoration effort than introducing ammonia through fertilization, which artificially drove up ammonia levels. The antioxidant enzyme activity test helps in the aid in identifying metal contamination in aquatic habitats. The biomarker test was used to complete this task instead of the antioxidant enzyme activity, due to a higher efficiency and higher accuracy.

Watermilfoils often form a thick layer of weed that disrupts sunlight emission to native species such as plants and fish that are underneath the layer. Specifically in North America, where the plants of this genera, foremost the Eurasian Watermilfoil M. spicatum, are considered invasive. The native plants are at risk due to the milfoil threatening ecological balance of invaded lakes and ponds. They have been found to block sunlight to other plants due to its thick leaf structure, lowering the rate of emission to more of the native plants found below. However, this has not been reported for M. alterniflorum.

== Control/Mitigation ==
=== Mechanical ===
Milfoils can be harvested using traditional methods such as manual removal and pruning. This method is cost efficient but is not time efficient or effective long term. Pulling the plant from the root does not guarantee success of removal. Machinery can also be used for clearing invaded areas. The downside of using machinery is the expensive cost. Selectivity is also limited since the machine targets all plants.

=== Chemical ===
Selectivity is an issue that arises again when using chemicals to control the invasive species. The chemicals can sometimes eliminate native species as well, leaving nothing behind. Consistency is essential when using herbicides in order to get rid of the plant when it does grow back. A commonly used herbicide is 2-4-D, fluridone (Sonar) or triclopyr.
