= Fantome =

Fantôme (French "phantom") may refer to:

== Places ==
- Fantome Island, an island off the east coast of Australia
- Fantome Rock, a dangerous rock in the South Atlantic

== Ships and planes ==
- HMS Fantome, several ships of the Royal Navy
- Fantome (schooner), a 1927 sail cruise ship lost in Hurricane Mitch in 1998
- Fantome-class sloop, used by the Royal Navy
- Fantome-class survey motor boat, used in Australia
- Fairey Fantôme, a British fighter aircraft of the 1930s

== Literature and entertainment ==
- Le Fantôme, an 1893 novel by Remy de Gourmont
- Fantôme (album), a 2016 Japanese album by Utada Hikaru
- Le Fantôme (La Patrouille des Castors), a volume in the French comic books series La Patrouille des Castors
- Fantôme (studio), a French animation studio
- "Le Fantôme", a chanson by Georges Brassens
- "Fantômes", a poem by Victor Hugo from the collection Les Orientales en 1829
- Fantômes (2001 film), a French film by Jean-Paul Civeyrac
- Les Fantômes (band), French rock group of the 1960s

== Other ==
- Fantôme Brewery, a brewery in Wallonia, Belgium
- Mint Fantôme, independent VTuber

== See also ==
- Phantom (disambiguation)
- Fantom (disambiguation)
