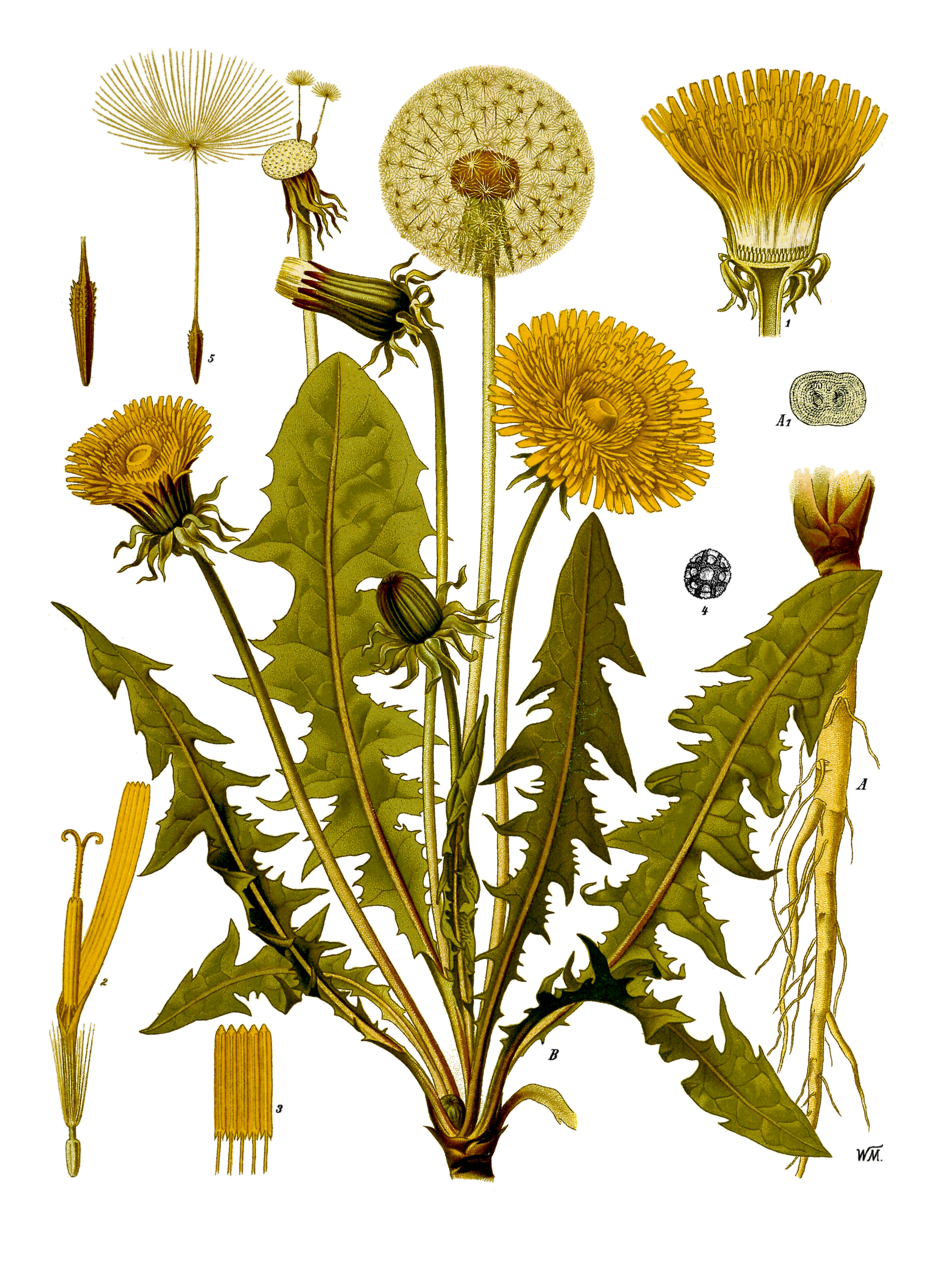
- Common dandelion

Conservation status
- Least Concern (IUCN 3.1)(Europe)

- Secure (NatureServe)

Scientific classification
- Kingdom: Plantae
- Clade: Embryophytes
- Clade: Tracheophytes
- Clade: Angiosperms
- Clade: Eudicots
- Clade: Asterids
- Order: Asterales
- Family: Asteraceae
- Genus: Taraxacum
- Species: T. officinale

Binomial name
- Taraxacum officinale (L.) Weber ex F.H.Wigg.

Synonyms
- Crepis taraxacum (L.) Stokes; Leontodon taraxacum L.; Leontodon vulgare Lam.; Taraxacum campylodes G.E.Haglund; Taraxacum dens-leonis Desf.; Taraxacum mexicanum DC.; Taraxacum retroflexum Lindl.; Taraxacum subspathulatum A.J. Richards; Taraxacum sylvanicum R. Doll; Taraxacum taraxacum (L.) H. Karst.; Taraxacum tenejapense A.J. Richards; Taraxacum vulgare Schrank

= Taraxacum officinale =

Flowering plant species known as dandelion

Taraxacum officinale, the dandelion or common dandelion, is a herbaceous perennial flowering plant in the daisy family, Asteraceae. The common dandelion is well-known for its yellow flower heads that turn into round balls of many silver-tufted fruit, which disperse in the wind. These balls are sometimes called "clocks" or "blowballs".

Originally native to Eurasia, as a result of its hardiness and easy propagation, the dandelion has become widely established across several continents. It has been introduced to southern Africa, the Americas, Australia, and New Zealand. It grows in temperate regions of the world in areas with moist soils. They are able to grow in a variety of environments and are tolerant of crowding, extreme temperatures, and low moisture.

The dandelion is often considered a weed, especially in lawns, but it is increasingly being recognised in its native regions as useful for attracting birds and pollinating insects. In one study, it ranked as the fourth most important source of pollen. Although dandelion pollen is considered to be an early food resource for some emerging pollinators in spring, it has also been found to lack certain essential nutrients and can lead to declining brood health for bees. The leaves, flowers, and roots are sometimes used as food and in herbal medicine.

== Description ==
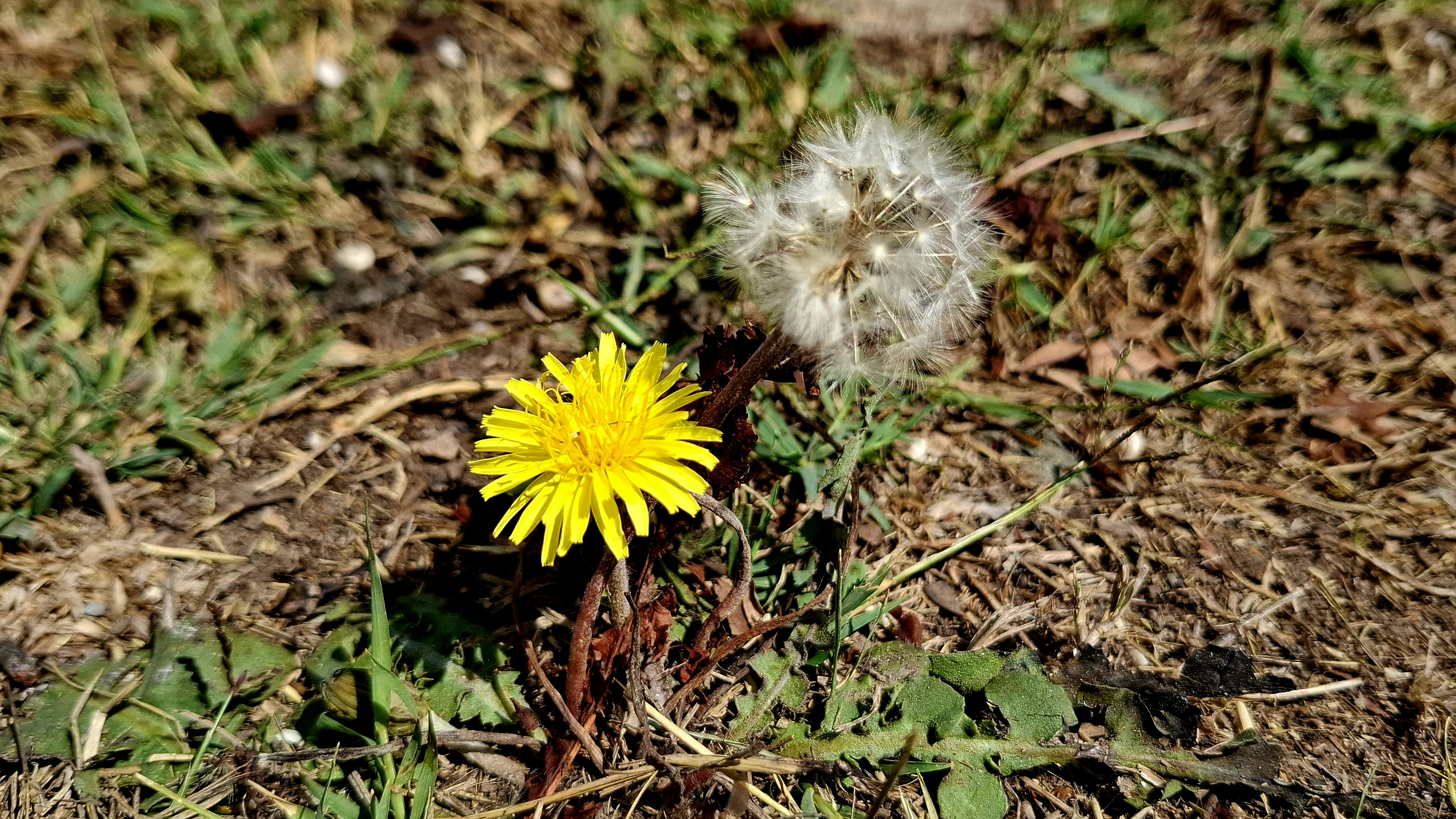
Two life cycle stages of Taraxacum officinale: flower head (left) and seed head (right)

Taraxacum officinale grows from a (generally unbranched) taproot and produces several hollow, leafless flower stems, typically 5–40 centimetres (2–15 3/4 inches) tall, but occasionally reaching up to 70 cm (28 in) tall. The stems can be tinted purplish, are upright or lax, and produce flower heads that are held as tall or taller than the foliage. The foliage may be upright-growing or horizontally spreading; the leaves have petioles that are either unwinged or narrowly winged. The stems can be glabrous or sparsely covered with short hairs. Plants have milky latex, and the leaves are all basal; each flowering stem lacks bracts and has one single flower head. The yellow flower heads lack receptacle bracts, and all the flowers, which are called florets, are ligulate and bisexual. In many lineages, the seeds are mostly produced by apomixis, even though the flowers are frequently visited by diverse insects.

The leaves are 5–45 cm (2–17 3/4 in) long and 1–10 cm (1/2–4 in) wide, and they are oblanceolate, oblong, or obovate in shape, with the bases gradually narrowing to the petiole. The leaf margins are typically shallowly lobed to deeply lobed and often lacerate or toothed with sharp or dull teeth.

The calyculi (the cuplike bracts that hold the florets) are composed of 12 to 18 segments; each segment is reflexed and sometimes glaucous. The lanceolate-shaped bractlets are arranged in two series, with acuminate apices. The 14–25 millimetres (1/2–1 in) wide involucres are green to dark green or brownish-green, with dark grey or purplish tips. The florets number 40 to over 100 per head, having yellow or orange-yellow corollas.

The fruit, called cypselae, range in colour from olive-green or olive-brown to straw-coloured or greyish; they are oblanceoloid in shape and 2–3 mm (1/16–1/8 in) long, with slender beaks. The fruit have 4 to 12 ribs that have sharp edges. The silky pappi, which form the parachutes, are white to silver-white in colour and around 6 mm wide. Plants typically have 24 or 40 pairs of chromosomes, while some have 16 or 32 pairs.

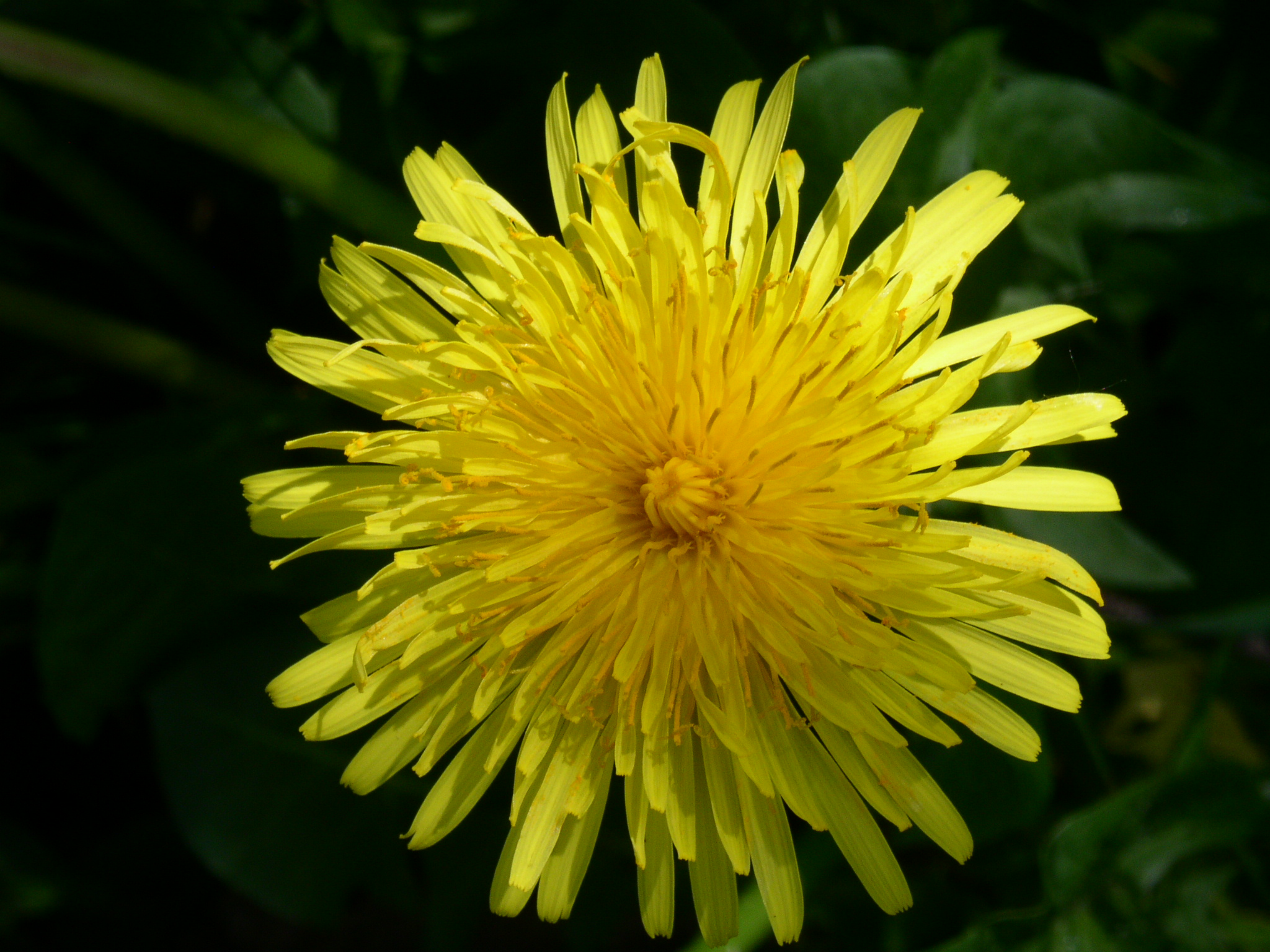
Dandelion flower

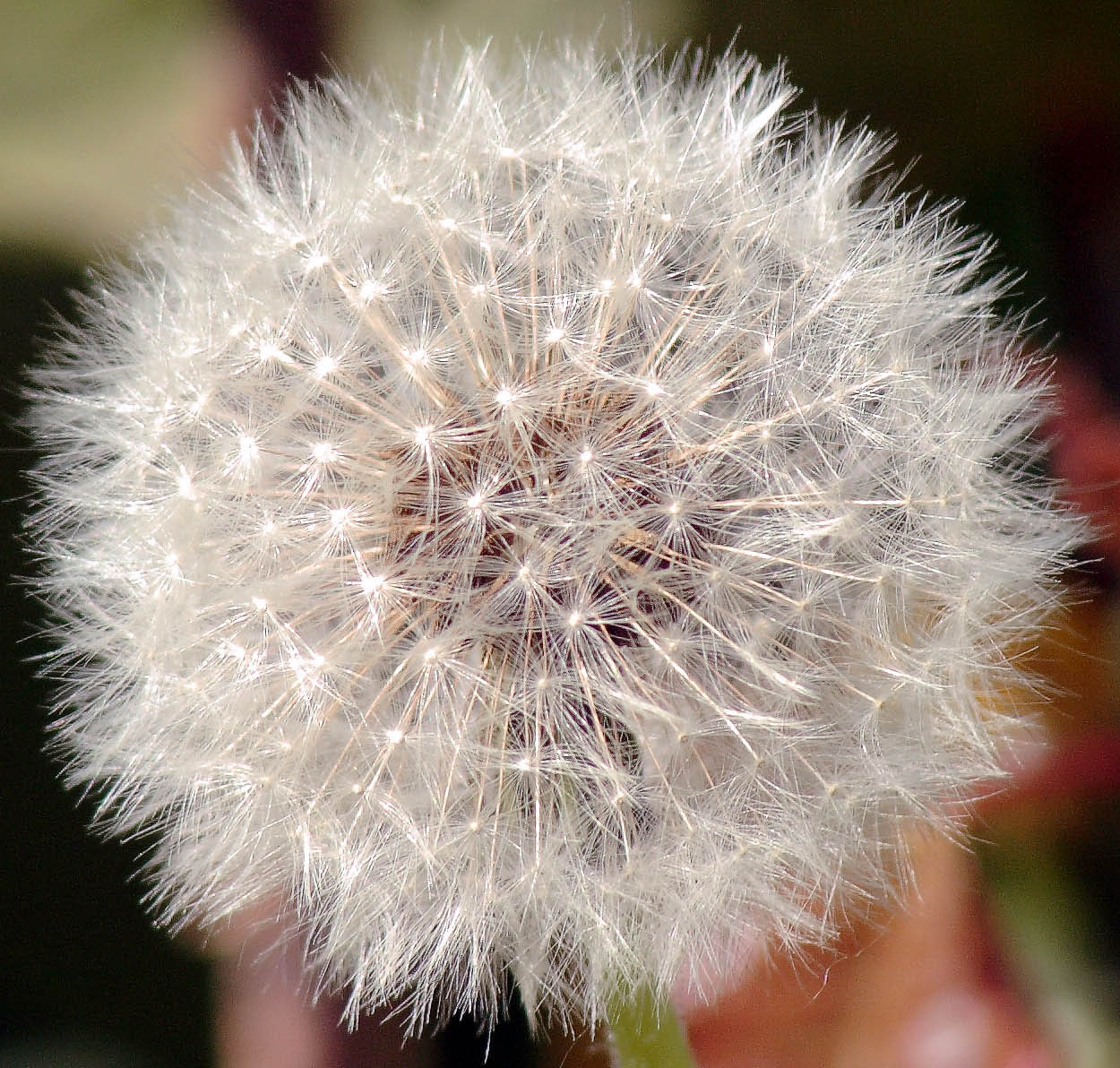
Ripe fruit

=== Chemistry ===
Taraxalisin

Identifiers
- EC no.: ?
- CAS no.: 217442-60-9

Taraxalisin is a serine proteinase found in the latex of dandelion roots. Rudenskaya et al. (1998) found that taraxalisin hydrolyzes a chromogenic peptide substrate Glp-Ala-Ala-Leu-pNA optimally at pH 8.0. Maximal activity of the proteinase in the roots is attained in April, at the beginning of plant development after the winter period.

== Taxonomy ==
Carl Linnaeus named the species Leontodon taraxacum in 1753. The current genus name Taraxacum derives possibly from the Arabic Tharakhchakon, or from the Greek Tarraxos. The specific name officinalis refers to its value as a medicinal herb, and is derived from the word opificina, later officina, meaning a workshop or pharmacy.

The taxonomy of the genus Taraxacum is complicated by apomictic and polyploid lineages, and the taxonomy and nomenclatural situation of T. officinale is not yet fully resolved. The taxonomy of this genus has been complicated by the recognition of numerous species, subspecies and microspecies. For example, the UK flora currently includes 239 species (of which 58 endemic and 45 non-native), and Rothmaler's Flora of Germany accepts roughly 70 microspecies.

T. officinale has a fossil record that goes back to glacial and interglacial times in Europe.

=== European dandelions ===
Taraxacum officinale L. (dandelion) is a vigorous weed in Europe with diploid sexual populations in the southern regions and partially overlapping populations of diploid sexuals and triploid or tetraploid apomicts in the central and northern regions.

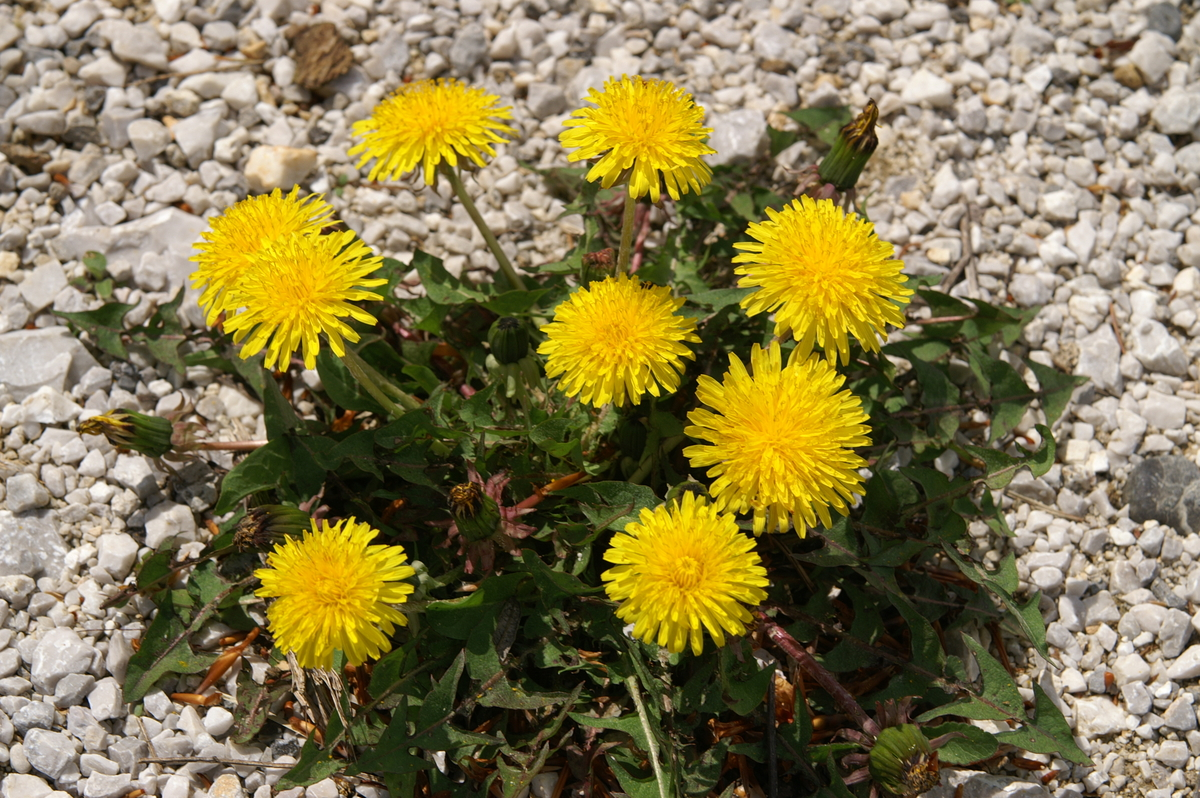
Dandelion in Toško Čelo, Slovenia

These European dandelions can be divided into two groups. The first group reproduces sexually, as do most seed plants. This group consists of dandelions that have a diploid set of chromosomes, and are sexually self-incompatible. Sexual reproduction involves a reduction of the somatic chromosome number by meiosis followed by a restoration of the somatic chromosome number by fertilisation. Diploid dandelions have eight pairs of chromosomes, and meiosis is regular with normal pairing of homologous chromosomes at the metaphase I stage of meiosis.

The second group consists of polyploid (mostly triploid) apomicts, meaning that both a viable embryo as well as a functional endosperm is formed without prior fertilisation. In contrast to the sexual diploids, the pairing of chromosomes at metaphase I in triploid apomicts is strongly reduced. However pairing is still sufficient to allow some recombination between homologous chromosomes.

=== North American dandelions ===
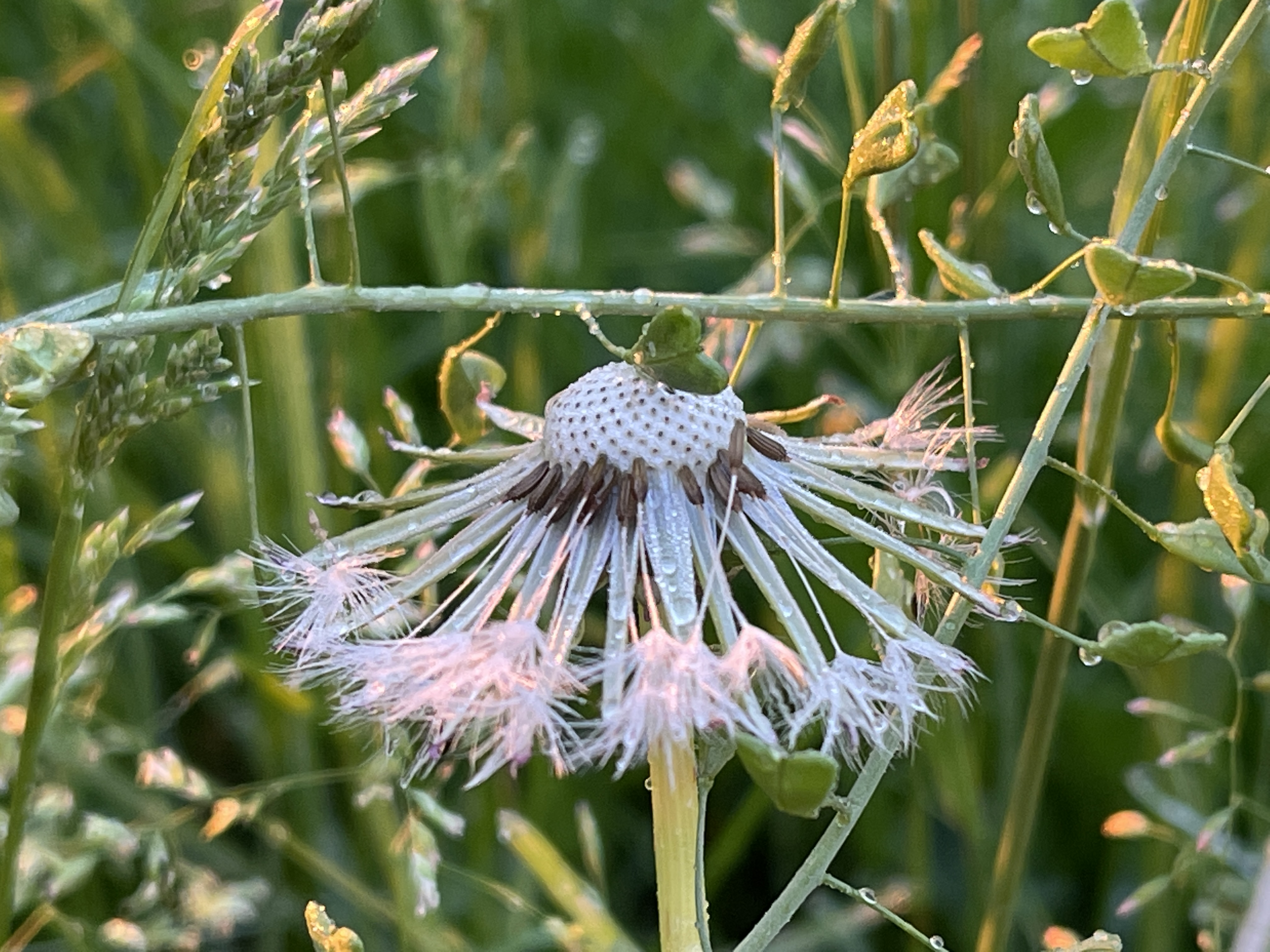
Saint-Prosper-de-Champlain, Quebec, Canada

The plants introduced to North America, originally as a food crop, are triploids that mainly reproduce by obligate gametophytic apomixis Though sexual dandelion plants are known in North America, almost all are clones that produce genetically identical seeds through apomixis. Some authorities recognise two subspecies of Taraxacum officinale, including:

- Taraxacum officinale subsp. officinale, which is commonly called common dandelion or wandering dandelion.
- Taraxacum officinale subsp. vulgare (Lam.) Schinz & R. Keller, which is commonly called common dandelion.

A third taxon sometimes formerly considered a subspecies Taraxacum officinale subsp. ceratophorum (Ledeb.) Schinz ex Thellung, is now generally treated as a separate species, Taraxacum ceratophorum. It has a holarctic distribution.

=== Etymology ===
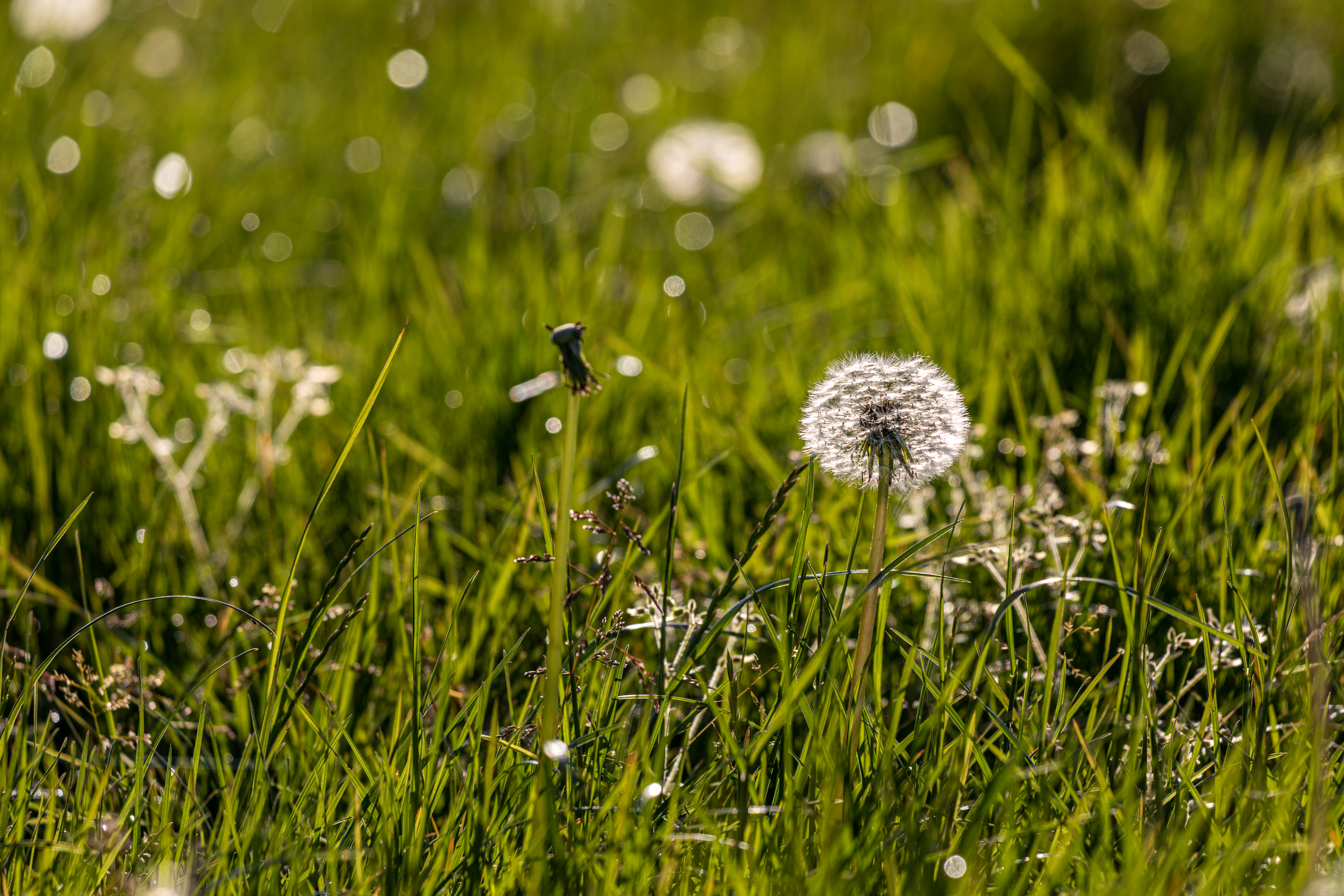
"Clocks" or "blowballs" above the grass

The Latin name Taraxacum derives from the Arabic tarakhshaqūn, meaning "bitter herb". The Arabic term is possibly of Persian origin. Persian polymath Al-Razi used the word tarakhshaqūn in relation to dandelions, chicory, and endives. Al-Razi wrote "the tarakhshaqūn is like chicory, but more efficacious"; it is unclear exactly to which plant Al-Razi referred however. If Persian in origin, the word could have originally meant "bitter purslane" from تلک (talk or bitter) and چکش (chakūk or purslane). Gerard of Cremona, in translating Arabic to Latin around 1170, spelled it tarasacon.

The Latin specific epithet officinale refers to the Latin word for 'medicinal' or 'of the apothecaries'.

T. officinale has many English common names (some of which are no longer in use), lion's-tooth, cankerwort, milk-witch, yellow-gowan, Irish daisy, monks-head, priest's-crown and puff-ball; other common names include, faceclock, pee-a-bed, wet-a-bed, swine's snout, white endive, and wild endive. The balls of seed heads are called "clocks" in both British and American English or "blowballs".

The common name dandelion comes from the French dent de lion, or "lion's tooth", in reference to the plant's jagged-edged leaves. "Pee-a-bed" and "wet-a-bed" reflect the modern French term for the plant, pissenlit. This name and all those that imply ramped-up urine production refer to its well-known diuretic properties.

== Distribution and habitat ==
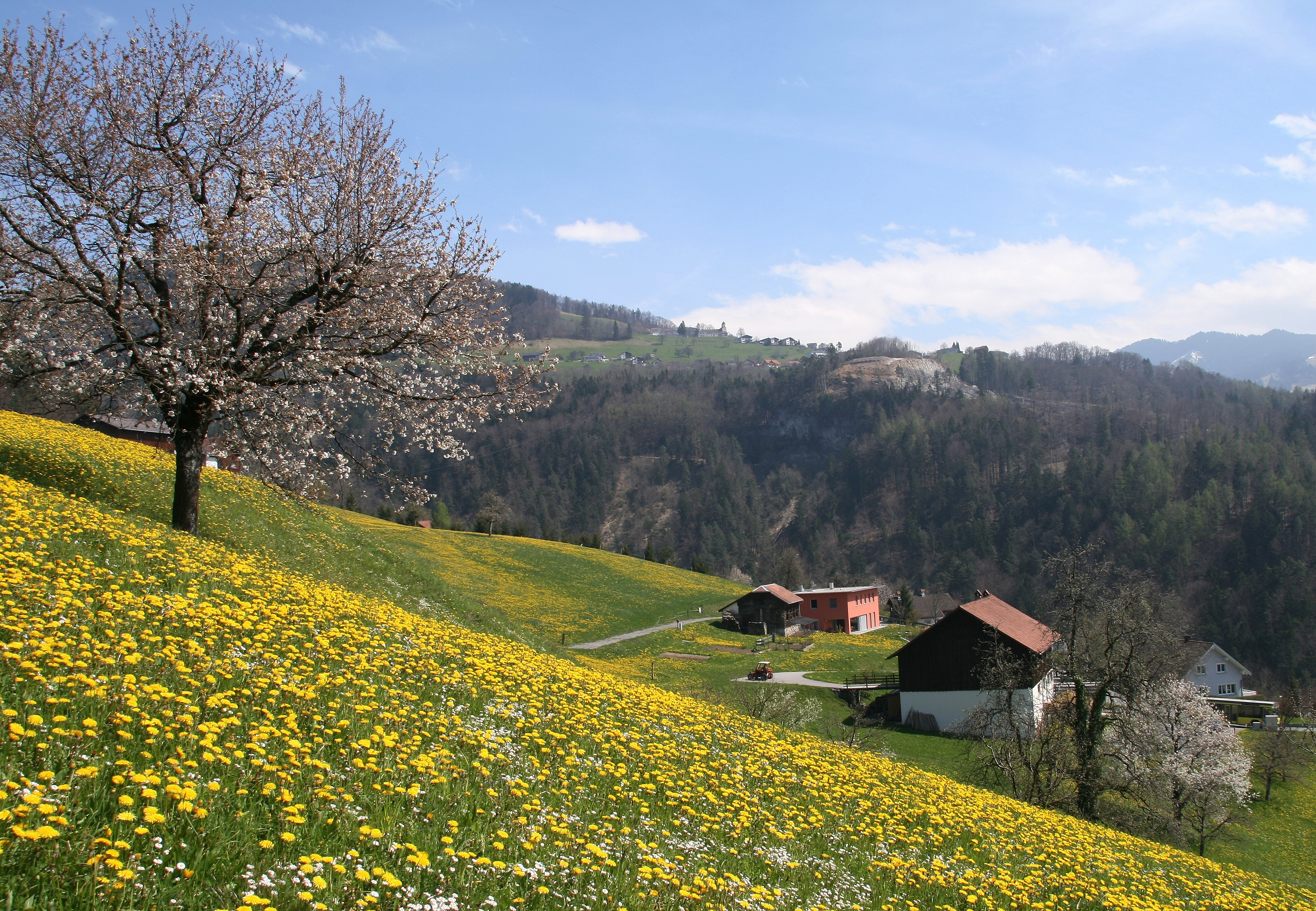
A field covered in blooming dandelions and daisies in Weiler, Austria

Taraxacum officinale is native to Europe and Asia, and was originally imported to America as a food crop. It is now naturalised throughout North America (including all 50 states of the US and most Canadian provinces), southern Africa, South America, New Zealand, Australia, and India.

The plant grows in temperate regions of the world in lawns, on roadsides, disturbed banks, shores of waterways, and other areas with moist soils. They are very hardy plants, able to grow in a variety of environments, and are tolerant of crowding, extremes of temperature, and low moisture.

The plant is coveted by collectors in regions where the plant is trickier to grow such as the tropics, where people would often resort to smuggling seeds from overseas.

=== Conservation ===
Taraxacum officinale was evaluated in 2013 by the IUCN as "Least Concern" due to a large and stable population. It was similarly evaluated by NatureServe in 2016 as "Globally Secure", G5.

== Ecology ==
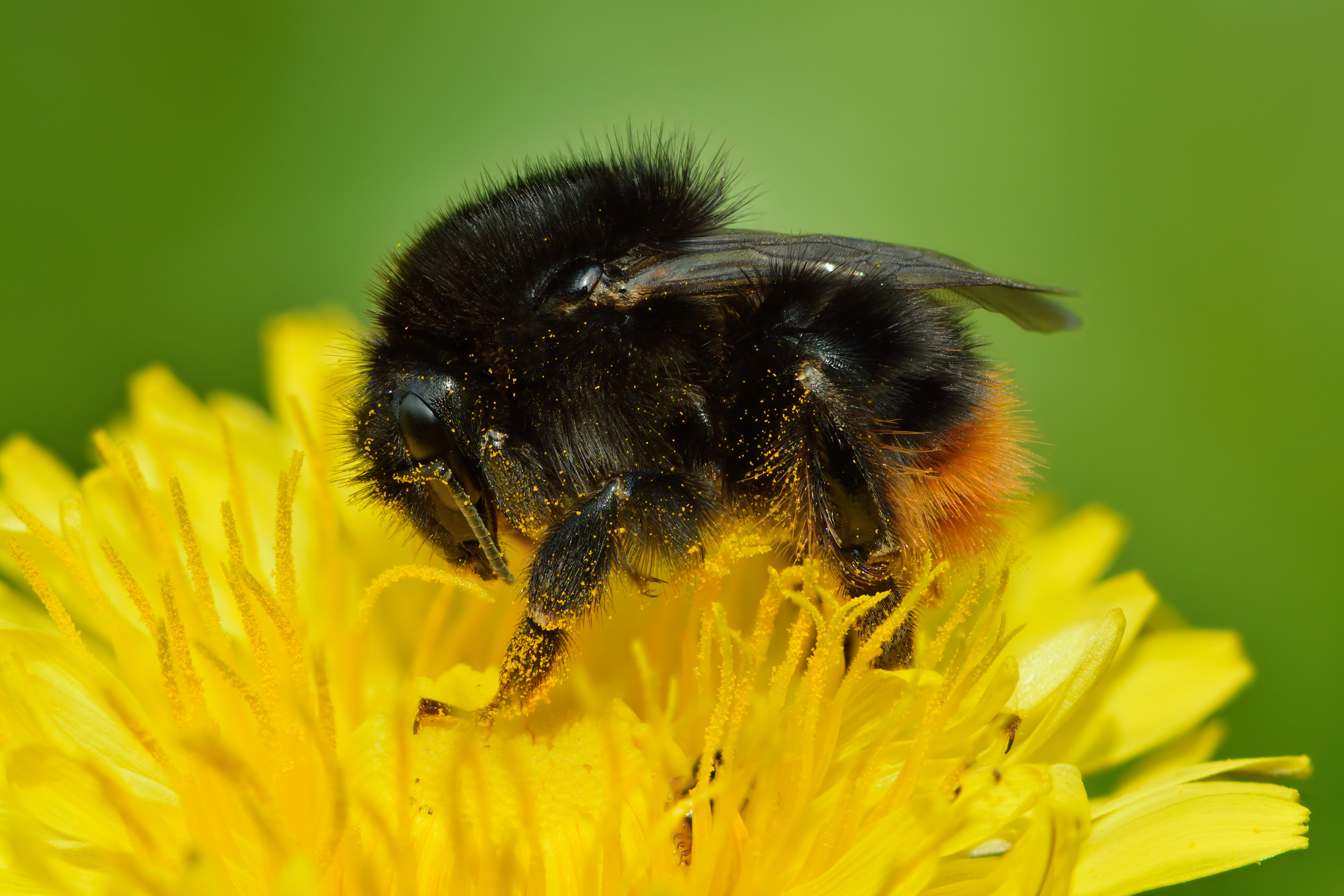
Dandelions provide both pollen and nectar for insects.

It is considered a noxious weed in some jurisdictions, and is considered to be a nuisance in residential and recreational lawns in North America. It is also an important weed in agriculture and causes significant economic damage because of its infestation in many crops worldwide.

T. officinale can serve as an indicator plant for soil potassium and calcium, as the plant favours soils with relatively low concentrations of calcium, but favours soils with relatively high concentrations of potassium.

The dandelion is a common colonist of disturbed habitats, both from wind blown seeds and seed germination from the seed bank. The seeds remain viable in the seed bank for many years, with one study showing germination after nine years. This species is a somewhat prolific seed producer, with 54 to 172 seeds produced per head, and a single plant can produce more than 5,000 seeds a year. It is estimated that more than 97,000,000 seeds/hectare could be produced yearly by a dense stand of dandelions. When released, the seeds can be spread by the wind up to several hundred meters from their source. The seeds are also a common contaminant in crop and forage seeds. The plants are adaptable to most soils and the seeds are not dependent on cold temperatures before they will germinate but they need to be within the top 2.5 cm (1 in) of soil. Dandelions can also regenerate themselves from fragments of taproot.

T. officinale is food for the caterpillars of several Lepidoptera (butterflies and moths), such as the tortrix moth Celypha rufana. See also List of Lepidoptera that feed on dandelions.

Even though dandelion pollen is of poor nutritional quality for honey bees, they readily consume it, and it can be an important source of nutritional diversity in heavily managed monocultures such as that of blueberries, or in early spring, as one of the first flowers to bloom. Honey bees have not been shown to lower their pollination activity on nearby fruit crops when foraging on dandelions.

While not in bloom, this species is sometimes confused with others, such as Chondrilla juncea, that have similar basal rosettes of foliage. Another plant, sometimes referred to as fall dandelion, is very similar to dandelion, but produces "yellow fields" later. Its blooms resemble some of the species of Sonchus, but are larger.

The dandelion thrives in conditions of elevated carbon dioxide, growing to a higher biomass and producing a larger number of viable seeds. Therefore, it is anticipated that the dandelion will become more competitive and widespread as atmospheric carbon dioxide levels increase.

It is increasingly being recognised in its native regions as an excellent wildflower for attracting pollinating insects and birds that feed on the seeds. In one study, it ranked as the fourth most important pollen source, after willow, meadowsweet and blackberry.

== Uses ==
Dandelion greens, raw
Nutritional value per 100 g (3.5 oz)
- Energy: 188 kJ (45 kcal)
- Carbohydrates: 9.2 g
- Sugars: 0.71 g
- Dietary fibre: 3.5 g
- Fat: 0.7 g
- Protein: 2.7 g
Vitamins and minerals
Vitamins	Quantity %DV^{†}
Vitamin A equiv. beta-Carotene lutein zeaxanthin	56% 508 μg 54% 5854 μg 13610 μg
Thiamine (B1)	16% 0.19 mg
Riboflavin (B2)	20% 0.26 mg
Niacin (B3)	5% 0.806 mg
Pantothenic acid (B5)	2% 0.084 mg
Vitamin B6	15% 0.251 mg
Folate (B9)	7% 27 μg
Choline	6% 35.3 mg
Vitamin C	39% 35 mg
Vitamin E	23% 3.44 mg
Vitamin K	649% 778.4 μg
Minerals	Quantity %DV^{†}
Calcium	14% 187 mg
Iron	17% 3.1 mg
Magnesium	9% 36 mg
Manganese	15% 0.342 mg
Phosphorus	5% 66 mg
Potassium	13% 397 mg
Sodium	3% 76 mg
Zinc	4% 0.41 mg
- Other constituents: Quantity
- Water: 85.6 g
- Link to USDA Database entry
- ^{†}Percentages estimated using US recommendations for adults, except for potassium, which is estimated based on expert recommendation from the National Academies.

=== Culinary ===
The plant has several culinary uses: the flowers are used to make dandelion wine, the greens are used in salads, the roots have been used to make a coffee substitute (when baked and ground into powder) and the plant was used by Native Americans as a food and medicine.

Dandelions are harvested from the wild or grown on a small scale as a leaf vegetable. The leaves (called dandelion greens) can be eaten cooked or raw in various forms, such as in soup or salad. They are probably closest in character to mustard greens. Usually the young leaves and unopened buds are eaten raw in salads, while older leaves are cooked. Raw leaves have a slightly bitter taste. Dandelion salad is often accompanied with hard-boiled eggs. The leaves are high in vitamins A and C, as well as iron, phosphorus, and potassium.

Dandelion flowers can be used to make dandelion wine, for which there are many recipes. Most of these are more accurately described as "dandelion-flavoured wine", as some other sort of fermented juice or extract serves as the main ingredient. It has also been used in a saison ale called Pissenlit (the French word for dandelion, literally meaning "wet the bed") made by Brasserie Fantôme in Belgium. Dandelion and burdock is a soft drink that has long been popular in the United Kingdom.

Another recipe using the plant is dandelion flower jam. In Silesia and other parts of Poland and the world, dandelion flowers are used to make a honey substitute syrup with added lemon (so-called May-honey). Ground roasted dandelion root can be used as a non-caffeinated coffee substitute.

=== Diuretic ===
The diuretic properties of T. officinale, believed to be a result of the plant's high potassium content, have been well described. The leaves of the common dandelion have been used as a diuretic in traditional Chinese medicine for approximately 2,000 years, with other regions of the world using the plant in the same way; in French, a common name for T. officinale is pissenlit, 'a colourful description of its diuretic activity'. A study conducted in 2009 noted 'promising' results regarding these diuretic properties, but that further studies would need to be conducted into the plant's efficacy.

=== Herbal medicine ===
Dandelion has been used in traditional medicine in Europe, North America, and China.

=== Research ===
Since asexually-reproducing dandelions produce genetically identical offspring, they are often useful as subjects for scientific research. For example, dandelions are used in studies where genetic differences between subjects needs to be minimal.

=== Education ===
Because of its worldwide distribution, familiarity, and presence in a wide variety of folkloric traditions, the dandelion has been highlighted as a valuable tool for educators seeking to help children of varying cultural and ethnic backgrounds connect to science through ethnobotany.

=== Folklore ===
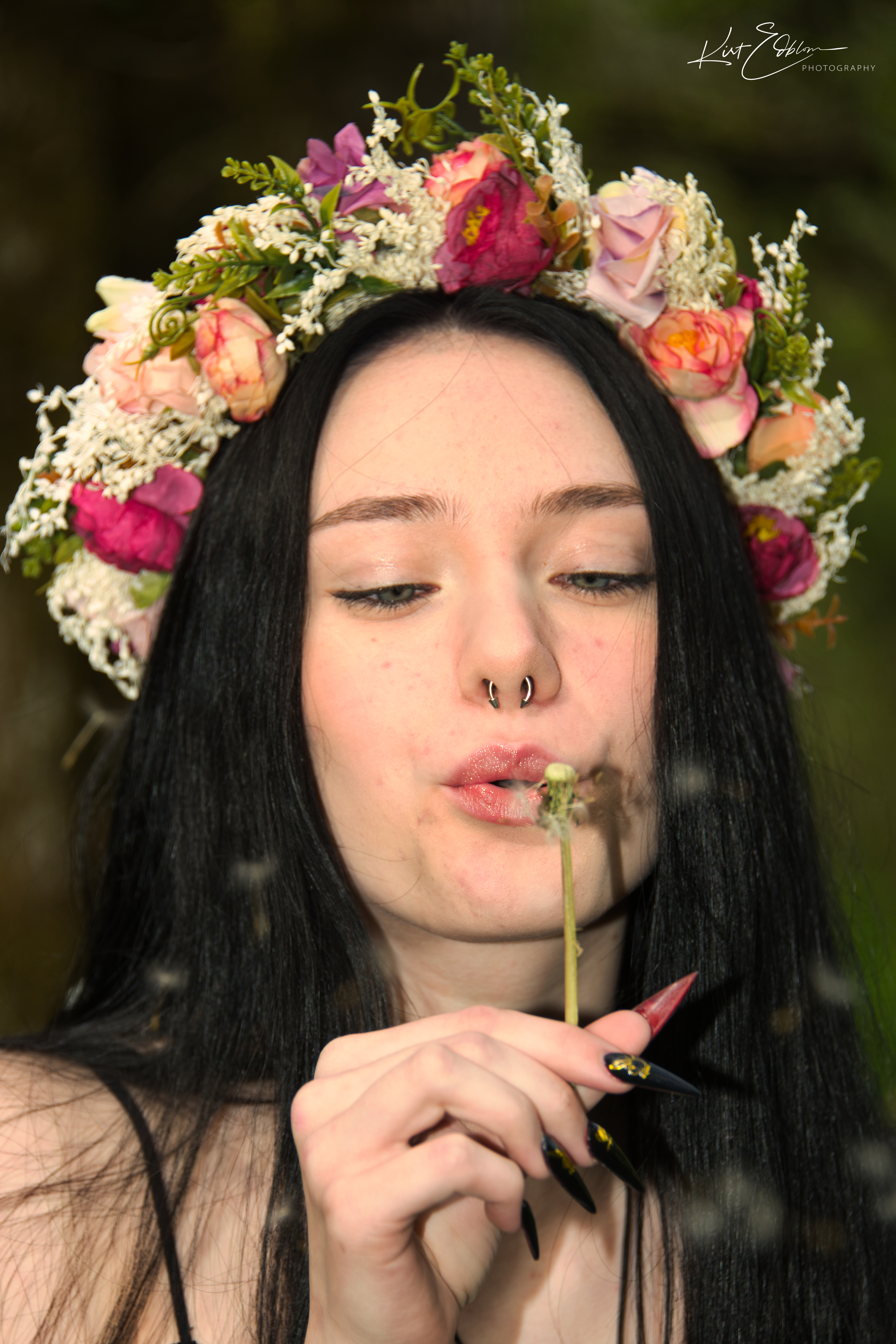
A woman blowing on the seed head of a dandelion

In folklore, blowing on the seed head of a dandelion is used as a method of divination to tell fate.

=== Other ===
Yellow dyes can be obtained from the flowers but little colour can be obtained from the roots of the plant. The latex can be used as a kind of glue.

== In culture ==
Cultures worldwide tell stories about the dandelion and have culinary and medicinal uses for it. A Native American folktale tells the story of a golden haired girl who attracted the fancy of the South Wind. The South Wind was too lazy to pursue her, until one day he realised she had grown old and her hair had turned white. Supposedly, when the South Wind sighs over the loss of his chance to pursue the golden-haired girl, his breath sends the white-haired dandelion seeds scattering to propagate more golden-haired daughters.

== See also ==
- Taraxacum erythrospermum
