= Phantom II =

Phantom II may refer to:

- McDonnell Douglas F-4 Phantom II, a U.S. fighter aircraft, introduced into service in 1960
- Phantom X1 or Phantom II, an ultralight trainer produced by Phantom Aeronautics
- Rolls-Royce Phantom II, a British luxury automobile manufactured by Rolls-Royce from 1929 to 1936
- Phantom 2, a model of the Phantom drone made by DJI

== See also ==
- Phantom (disambiguation)
