= Fantome Rock =

Rock in Bird Sound, South Georgia

Fantome Rock (54°0′S 38°1′W) is a dangerous rock in the middle of Bird Sound, South Georgia, lying 0.1 nautical miles (0.2 km) south of Gony Point, Bird Island. It was charted by Discovery Investigations personnel on the Discovery in the period 1926–30 and named by the UK Antarctic Place-Names Committee in 1963 for HMS Owen's motor cutter, used in a survey of this area in February–March 1961, and lost in heavy seas near this rock.
