= Gony Point =

Gony Point (54°0′S 38°1′W) is a high tussock-covered point 0.5 miles (0.8 km) southwest of Cardno Point, on the southeast side of Bird Island, South Georgia. It was surveyed by the South Georgia Survey in the period 1951–57, and named by the UK Antarctic Place-Names Committee in 1963. Gony (also spelled gooney) is an old sailors' name for the wandering albatross (Diomedea exulans), which breeds on Bird Island.
