= Fantom (disambiguation) =

Fantom is a Swedish velomobile.

Fantom may also refer to:

- FANTOM, an international research consortium
- Fantom (programming language), an object oriented programming language
- Fantom, a 2016 album by electro-pop group Mœnia
- Imaging phantom, a specially designed object for analyzing imaging devices
- Roland Fantom, a series of music workstations and synthesizers

== See also ==
- Fantome (disambiguation)
- Phantom (disambiguation)
