= Phantom =

Phantom, phantoms, or the phantom most often refers to:

- Spirit (metaphysics), the vital principle or animating force within all living things
  - Ghost, the soul or spirit of a dead person or animal that can appear to the living

Phantom, phantoms, or the phantom may also refer to:

== Arts and entertainment ==
=== Film ===
- O Fantasma, a 2000 Portuguese film whose name translates to "The Phantom" or "The Ghost" in English
- Phantom (1922 film), a silent film directed by F. W. Murnau
- Phantom (2002 film), a Malayalam film
- Phantom (2013 film), about a submarine captain trying to prevent a war
- Phantom (2015 film), an Indian political thriller directed by Kabir Khan
- Phantom (2023 film) film, a South Korean film set in 1933 during Japanese colonization of Korea
- Phantoms (film), 1998, adaptation of the Dean Koontz novel
- The Belgrade Phantom, a 2009 Serbian film
- The Phantom (1931 film), an American film directed by Alan James
- The Phantom (serial), a 1943 film serial based on the comic strip
- The Phantom (1961 film), an unaired television film pilot for a series based on the comic strip
- The Phantom (1996 film), directed by Simon Wincer starring Billy Zane, based on the comic strip
- The Phantom (2021 film), a documentary about a possible wrongful execution in Texas
- The Phantom Hour, a 2016 American short film

=== Literature ===
==== Books ====
- Phantom, a 1923 short novel by Gerhart Hauptmann
- Phantom, a 1982 novel by Thomas Tessier
- Phantoms, a 1989 short story anthology by Martin H. Greenberg and Rosalind M. Greenberg
- Phantom (Kay novel), 1990, by Susan Kay
- The Phantom, a 1993 Point Horror novel by Barbara Steiner
- Phantom (Sword of Truth), a 2006 novel by Terry Goodkind
- Phantom, a 2009 short story anthology edited by Paul Tremblay and Sean Wallace
- Phantom (Nesbø novel), 2012, by Jo Nesbø
- Phantoms (novel), 1983, by Dean Koontz
- The Last Vampire 4: Phantom, a 1996 novel by Christopher Pike, the fourth installment in The Last Vampire series

==== Comics and magazines ====
- The Phantom, an adventure comic strip title created by Lee Falk
- Phantom Magazine, a 2005 magazine edited by Nick Mamatas

==== Other uses in literature ====
- The Phantom (play), 1852, by Dion Boucicault

=== Music ===
==== Musicians, musical ensembles, and bands ====
- Phantom (band), a South Korea-based hip hop project trio
- Phantoms (duo), a Los-Angeles based EDM duo
- Phantom (producer), Nigerian record producer and singer-songwriter
- The Phantom Band, a Proto-Robofolk sextet based in Glasgow
- Phantom Regiment Drum and Bugle Corps, a drum corps based in Rockford, Illinois
- Jerry Lott (1938-1983), American rockabilly singer, songwriter and guitarist known by the stage name "The Phantom"
- Slim Jim Phantom (born 1961), stage name of James McDonnell, drummer for the Stray Cats

==== Musicals and works ====
- Phantom (musical), 1991
- Phantoms, a choral work by Ernst Toch
- The Phantom of the Opera (1986 musical), by Andrew Lloyd Webber

==== Albums ====
- Phantom (Betraying the Martyrs album), 2014
- Phantom (Khold album), 2002
- Phantoms (Alan Hull album), 1979
- Phantoms, by Hans Christian
- Phantoms, by Marianas Trench
- Phantoms (Acceptance album), 2005
- Phantoms (Freezepop EP), 2015
- Phantoms (Marianas Trench album), 2019
- Phantoms (The Fixx album), 1984
- The Phantom (album), 1968, by Duke Pearson
- The Phantom of the Opera (2004 soundtrack), the soundtrack album for the 2004 film The Phantom of the Opera

==== Songs ====
- "Phantom" (EsDeeKid and Rico Ace song), 2025
- "Phantom" (Geolier song), 2025
- "Phantom", by Broadcast from Work and Non Work, 1997
- "Phantom", by Capsule from More! More! More!, 2008
- "Phantom" and "Phantom Pt. II", by Justice from Cross, 2007
- "Phantom", by Mac DeMarco from Guitar, 2025
- "Phantom", by Rina Sawayama from Hold the Girl, 2022
- "Phantom", by Smokepurpp from Deadstar, 2017
- "Phantom", by T-Pain from Three Ringz, 2008
- "Phantom", by The Dirty Heads from Home – Phantoms of Summer, 2013
- "Phantom", by The Story So Far from The Story So Far, 2015
- "Phantom", by Low Roar from 0, 2014
- "Phantom", a song about a Soviet pilot of namesake plane in the Vietnam War, unknown date
- "Phantoms", by Meshuggah from Immutable, 2022
- "The Phantom", a pseudonym used by Jerry Lott for the primal rockabilly song "Love Me"
- "Phantom Lord", by Metallica from Kill 'Em All, 1983
- "Phantom of the Opera", by Iron Maiden from Iron Maiden, 1980

==== Other uses in music ====
- "Phantom 105.2", a former name for the radio section TXFM
- Phantom Records, a record label
- Vox Phantom, a guitar

=== Gaming ===
- CCI Phantom, a paintball marker
- "Phantom", a ghost type in the video game Phasmophobia
- Phantom (Devil May Cry), a demonic spider creature that serves as a boss in the video game Devil May Cry
- Phantom Animatronics, the antagonists of Five Nights at Freddy's 3
- Phantom Thieves, the group of main characters in Persona 5
- Phantoms, a type of enemy in The Legend of Zelda video game series
- Phantoms, a type of undead flying mob from the sandbox game Minecraft
- The Phantom, the title given to a nameless spy who is the main villain of Phoenix Wright: Ace Attorney – Dual Destinies
- The Phantom (game system), a cancelled cloud-based video game console from 2004

=== Television ===
==== Shows ====
- Danny Phantom, a Nickelodeon cartoon series
- Phantom (Russian TV series), an eight-part crime drama series first broadcast in 2020
- Phantom (South Korean TV series), a South Korean police procedural television series
- Phantom 2040, a French-American animated series loosely based on the comic strip hero The Phantom, created by Lee Falk
- The Phantom (miniseries), a 2010 science-fiction television miniseries inspired by the comic strip The Phantom

==== Episodes ====
- "Phantom", Boku Patalliro! season 2, episode 24 (1983)
- "Phantom", FBI season 6, episode 8 (2024)
- "Phantom", .hack//Sign episode 22 (2002)
- "Phantom" (Law & Order: Criminal Intent), season 1, episode 16 (2002)
- "Phantom", Smallville season 6, episode 22 (2007)
- "Phantom", The Strange Calls episode 3 (2012)
- "Phantom", Zoids: Chaotic Century season 2, episode 19 (2000)
- "Phantoms", Stargate Atlantis season 3, episode 9 (2006)
- "Phantoms", The Flash season 8, episode 9 (2022)
- "The Phantom", 9 to 5 season 2, episode 22 (1983)
- "The Phantom", Alvin and the Chipmunks (1983) season 6, episode 16a (1988)
- "The Phantom", Babar season 1, episode 13 (1989)
- "The Phantom" Eerie, Indiana: The Other Dimension episode 5 (1998)
- "The Phantom" (Mad Men), season 5, episode 13 (2012)
- "The Phantom", Outer Banks season 1, episode 10 (2020)
- "The Phantom", Swamp People season 6, episode 16 (2015)
- "The Phantom", The Loop series 2, episode 2 (2007)
- "The Phantom", Wrecked season 1, episode 6 (2016)

=== Characters ===
- Phantom (character), the eponymous protagonist of the comic strip The Phantom
- "The Phantom", alias of John Mundy, an Atlas Comics character created by John Buscema and John Severin introduced in Wild Western #8 (March 1949)
- Bob Phantom, an Archie Comics superhero
- "The Phantom", an alias of the DC Comics villain Bizarro
- The Phantom, a.k.a. Sir Charles Lytton, a gentleman jewel thief and the antagonist in the Pink Panther film series
- "The Phantom", alias of Donald Birch, a Marvel Comics character created by Stan Lee introduced in Tales of Suspense #63 (December 1964)
- The Phantom, a rock musician ghost character and the villain of a 1978 episode of The Scooby-Doo Show, "The Diabolical Disc Demon"
- Jack Phantom, a main character from the WildStorm comic book series Top 10
- Danny Phantom (character), the titular character of the series Danny Phantom
- The Phantom, a.k.a. Earl P. Sidebottom, the main antagonist in the animated television series Flying Rhino Junior High
- Phantom Flan Flinger, masked pie-throwing character on Tiswas
- The Phantom, the villain of a 2010 episode of Scooby-Doo! Mystery Incorporated, "In Fear of the Phantom"

=== Elements ===
- Phantom and Phantom II, an auxiliary ship to the Ghost from the TV series Star Wars Rebels and its replacement

== Medical ==
- Computational human phantom, a computerized model of the human body used primarily for radiation dose simulation
- Imaging phantom, an object used as a substitute for live or cadaver subjects
- Phantom limb, the sensation that a missing limb is still attached to the body
- Phantom pain, a perceived sensation

== Military ==
- "Phantom", the name of the GHQ Liaison Regiment, a World War II special reconnaissance unit
- "Phantom Division", the name of the United States' 9th Armored Division

== Sports ==
=== Teams ===
- American hockey:
  - Adirondack Phantoms (2009–14)
    - Lehigh Valley Phantoms (since 2014)
  - Philadelphia Phantoms (1996–09)
- Basketball:
  - Phantom BC
- Pittsburgh, Pennsylvania:
  - Pittsburgh Phantoms (ABA), basketball
  - Pittsburgh Phantoms (NPSL), soccer
  - Pittsburgh Phantoms (RHI), roller hockey
- Wiesbaden Phantoms, American football, Wiesbaden, Germany

=== Individuals ===
- "The Phantom", Chris Martin (cricketer) (born 1974), New Zealander
- Thoroughbred racehorses:
  - Phantom (horse) (1808–1834), British sire
  - The Phantom (horse) (born 1985), New Zealand

== Transport ==
=== Aircraft ===
- Boeing Phantom Eye, a High Altitude, Long Endurance (HALE) unmanned aerial vehicle
- Boeing Phantom Ray, a stealthy unmanned combat air vehicle
- McDonnell FH Phantom, a jet fighter aircraft, introduced 1947
- McDonnell Douglas F-4 Phantom II, a supersonic air-defense fighter and fighter-bomber, introduced 1960
- DJI Phantom, a series of unmanned aerial quadcopters developed by DJI
- Phantom X1, ultralight aircraft

=== Boats ===
- DC‐14 Phantom, an American catamaran design
- Flying Phantom Elite, a French hydrofoil catamaran sailboat design
- Flying Phantom Essentiel, a French hydrofoil catamaran sailboat design
- Phantom (dinghy), a British catboat design
- Phantom (pilot boat), Sandy Hook pilot boat built in 1867 from the designs by Dennison J. Lawlor
- Phantom (yacht), schooner-yacht built in 1865 by Joseph D. Van Deusen
- Phantom 14, an American lateen-rigged sailboat design
- Phantom 14 (catamaran), an Italian sailboat design
- Phantom 16 (catamaran), an Italian sailboat design

=== Land vehicles ===
- Gillig Phantom, a transit bus
- Phantom, a preserved British Rail Class 08 locomotive
- Rolls-Royce Phantom, a line of full-sized luxury cars

== Other uses ==
=== Individuals ===
- Salvador A. Rodolfo, Sr. (1919–2012), Filipino war hero, nicknamed "Phantom"
- Phantom Killer, American serial killer

=== Places ===
- Phantom Galaxy, another name for the galaxy Messier 74
- Phantom Rock, a tourist destination in the Wayanad district of Kerala, India

=== Technology ===
- Phantom (high-speed camera brand)
- Phantom power, a method of sending DC electrical voltage through microphone cables
- Phantom read, a phenomenon that can occur within a database transaction at certain isolation levels

== See also ==
- Apparition (disambiguation)
- Fantom (disambiguation)
- Fantome (disambiguation)
- Phantasm (disambiguation)
- Phantosmia, a form of olfactory hallucination
- The Phantom of the Opera (disambiguation)
