= List of Zoids: Chaotic Century episodes =

This is a list of the episodes appearing in the Zoids: Chaotic Century anime series. Guardian Force is the second season in the anime.

== Season 1 (Chaotic Century) ==
No.	Title	Original air date	English air date
1	"The Boy from Planet Zi (The Boy from Planet Zi)" (Japanese: 惑星Ziの少年)	September 4, 1999	February 18, 2002
Van is a boy who lives in a village on the Planet Zi. Inspired by the sacrifice of his father to protect their village, Van dreams of becoming a great Zoid pilot. He is attacked by desert bandits, and takes refuge in some ruins. While hiding he discovers an 'organoid' whom he names Zeke, who has the power to revive and merge with another Zoid. Using Zeke's power he restores a Shield Liger and uses it to defeat the bandits, then returns to the ruins to find a girl with amnesia inside a pod. With his new Zoids and mystery companion in tow, Van sets out to discover the girl's identity and become a great Zoid pilot like his father before him.
2	"The Mysterious Fiona (Mysterious Beautiful Girl Fine)" (Japanese: 謎の美少女フィーネ)	September 11, 1999	February 19, 2002
Returning to his village, Van introduces Zeke and the girl, Fiona, to his sister Maria and the rest of the town, explaining how they both emerged from pods, and how Fiona had lost her memory. Bandits attack while Van is out giving Fiona a tour of the area in the Liger, taking Maria hostage in exchange for Zeke. Briefly tied up while the villagers take Zeke the bandits, Van gets free with Fiona's help, and rushes off to save his sister. Before Zeke can merge with the Shield Liger however, the Liger gets damaged and Zeke is knocked unconscious. Zeke is apparently awakened through some mysterious ability of Fiona's before the Liger can be destroyed. After the battle, the townsfolk accept Van's choice to leave his town in his new role as a Zoid pilot, following in his father's footsteps as he chases after Fiona's memories.
3	"Memory (Memory)" (Japanese: 記憶)	September 18, 1999	February 20, 2002
Temporarily separated from Zeke and the Shield Liger, Van and Fiona are rescued from the desert by a man named Irvine, the pilot to a Command Wolf, who offers them food and a place to sleep for the night. After reuniting with Zeke and the Liger, the two find an ancient fortress guarded by a Gordos and are forced to sneak in through the sewer. As they search through the ruins they find a diary of a soldier who was stationed at the fortress fifty years early, and through reading it learn that the Gordos was abandoned by the soldier due to its damaged leg, which Van attempts to fix. It turns out that Irvine is trying to capture Zeke, as he reappears to attack the Gordos, and later Van, only to retreat when the Gordos defends the damaged Shield Liger. While exploring the ruins, Van and Fiona find an ancient tablet with mysterious writing on it, and Fiona remembers something called the 'Zoid Eve'. Though neither Van nor Fiona knows what it means, they decide to set off in search of more information about this 'Zoid Eve'.
4	"The Protectors (Futari Yojibo)" (Japanese: ふたりの用心棒)	September 25, 1999	February 21, 2002
After a misunderstanding where Fiona dumps out all of the water the group was carrying, Van and Fiona find themselves in a village regularly attacked by the same bandits that have given Van trouble before. The village has hired Irvine as a protector, spurring Van to prove himself just as capable when the bandits attack. Despite being outnumbered, Van manages to take out most of the bandits by blowing up an aquifer, though in the end he has to be saved by Irvine.
5	"Sleeper Trap (Sleeper Trap)" (Japanese: スリーパー・トラップ)	October 2, 1999	February 22, 2002
After saving the village from the Desert Alcavaleno Gang, the Shield Liger had some pretty serious damage. Van almost has a heart-attack when he finds out that Fiona ate his Papaya. Soon afterward, they meet a sassy girl, Moonbay. She examines his Shield Liger and notices that the front-back leg has missile damage on it. They talk until a couple of sleeper Guysacks attack them. With Moonbay's Gustav burdened by the heavy load, she can not put any weapons onto it. But Irvine arrives and destroys all of the Guysacks except one that managed to slip by and cause him some damage. Moonbay finds a good place to camp out for the night, an ancient fortress base. Both the Command Wolf and the Shield Liger are seriously damaged. Irvine becomes suspicious and asked Moonbay if her cargo had any Imperial firepower. Moonbay verified that and told Irvine that it was all loaded with Imperial arms and that they would explode if anything hit it. At dinner, Van tells Moonbay and Irvine what they have been doing. Van, Fiona and Zeke go for a treasure hunt and wind up swimming. During his swim, Van finds the remains of a Zoid. Irvine goes to get his electromagnetic whip to get Zeke and just then more sleeper Guysacks attack. Irvine figures that it was a sleeper trap. The Guysacks they fought earlier were decoys that led them into the ruins so that they could easily be surrounded. The remains that Van saw were one of its captured prey that the sleepers had defeated. Moonbay took her cargo and left out the back with Van while Irvine made a complete 360 and came around. There is a fierce battle with just two zoids against more than a battalion of sleepers. Moonbay drives half of them her way. Then Van and Irvine reappear, but this time Moonbay decides to jettison her cargo and leaves. When the Guysacks attack the ammunition it blows them all up. Moonbay returns and asks Van to be her protector.
6	"Jump! Zeke! (Tobe! Zeke)" (Japanese: とべ! ジーク)	October 9, 1999	February 25, 2002
Van and Co. are traveling along when they come across soldiers of the Helic Republic, who mistake them for Imperials, especially after registering the earlier explosion. They take them prisoner after a scuffle and impound the zoids. Irvine reveals his true resourcefulness when he uses a hidden trick to break himself out and Van along with him. Van promises to return for the girls and takes off with Irvine for the zoids. Zeke and the Liger merge and Van and Irvine take off through the base. The Republican soldiers mobilize several Petras and try to stop them. Out of the base, Van tries to lose the soldiers among the crevices, but when he is cornered and goes for the ammunition he finds out the zoids were stripped of their firepower and is chastised by Irvine for his stupidity. Irvine tries to figure out a way to save his own skin when Van gets an idea and starts running the Liger at the walls of the canyon. He bounces from side to side gaining altitude, and finally clears the canyon, taking out two of the Republicans following them. He makes a try for the third, piloted by Capt. Herman. Irvine, showing that he's actually beginning to like the kid, offers a hand, and coordinates jumps with the Command Wolf so that at its peak jump from the canyon the Liger could jump off it and strike Herman who thought he was just high enough. The pilots of the Petras bail, and as he's floating down Herman makes a respectful note of Van's achievements. The episode ends with Major Schubaltz of the Empire preparing his forces for the assault on the Republicans at Red River, and Irvine scouting around.
7	"The Battle of Red River (Battle of the Red River)" (Japanese: レッドリバーの戦い)	October 16, 1999	February 26, 2002
After beating the captain, Van and Zeke decide to go and rescue Moonbay and Fiona. When they barge in, they are told that they are working for the Republic. Both Moonbay and Fiona are told that they will be given cargo loaded with explosives that are to be detonated at Fire Bridge. Then Major Schubaltz and Minister Prozan have a discussion about the attack on the rebels. Major Schubaltz says that he will only attack if they are attacked first. At the battlefield, the Republic had its Godos' and Guysacks all lined up with the main captain in the green Gordos. On the Imperial front, they had all 50 Molgas lined up with their commander Major Schubaltz in the Dark Horn. Both captains step out, have a word with each other, and return to their respective zoids. Then Minister Prozan has a word with Marcus, a soldier from the front line. He tells him to launch the first attack and make it look like the Republic did it. If he did, he would be promoted. Then Marcus tells Rosso to use the Pteras they got and attack their forces and in which would begin the battle. Then after a long wait, a Pteras attacks their side and the battle starts up again. Van is ordered to destroy Fire Bridge because the explosives did not work and they had lost contact with the girls. At the gorge Irvine assists Van in making it across the River. Van destroys Fire Bridge. He makes it through the front lines of the Imperial Army and finally makes it to the Republican Side.
8	"The Road to the Republic (Road to the Republic)" (Japanese: 共和国への道｣)	October 23, 1999	February 27, 2002
After meeting success at Red River, the gang thinks that if they make it to the Republican Capital they may find a clue to Zoid Eve. Before they leave Captain Herman gives them a letter of introduction, while Irvine tries to take Zeke, but fails. Moonbay and the others stop by a near village to load up on supplies. Moonbay and the others go out to get some supplies. Irvine, Fiona and Zeke get separated from Van. Meanwhile, Fiona goes on a shopping spree for fruit and makes Irvine pay. Van and Moonbay get tailed by Rosso's gang and chased all over the village, and finally get caught. Irvine hears a gunshot in the village. He rushes and finds out that Moonbay and Van have been caught, they have been trapped and are tied around the Shield Liger's foot. Fiona tries to untie them but also gets caught, but Irvine manages to get Van and Moonbay free. Van and Zeke get in the Shield Liger. Then, Rosso shows up in his Red Horn and launches a devastating assault with all of his weapons on the Red Horn. Van survives after learning that he could put up a shield with the Shield Liger. He then rams the Red Horn and Rosso does the same. Van and the rest of the gang leave because the Imperial Army shows up. Rosso surrenders to the army only after telling everyone of his gang to leave. Rosso gets caught and tells Van not to get caught because he defeated the Desert Alcavaleno Gang.
9	"The Valley of the Monster (Valley of Monsters)" (Japanese: 魔物のすむ谷)	October 30, 1999	February 28, 2002
Van and the gang barely make it past the Imperial Army. The Shield Liger was not working too well either; its sights were not aligned properly. Then the zoids started to do something weird, and Irvine finds out that they are in the Valley of the Rare Hertz. In this valley there is a pulse that gets emitted that makes the zoids not work properly. Zoids affected by the rare-hertz begin to take on violent tendencies and run out of control, usually destroying themselves. The proof was an old, rusted Godos which was damaged beyond repair. They put on their pulse guards which protects their zoids from the rare-hertz. When they are about to leave Zeke is also affected by the rare-hertz. He looks sick. But then he becomes completely controlled by the rare-hertz and rams the Gustav. He then fuses with the Shield Liger, damages Irvine's Command Wolf, and leaves. Moonbay fixes Irvine's Command Wolf. Van flees after Irvine tells him he cannot use his Command Wolf. He walks until the Shield Liger's tracks disappear, then notices the Shield Liger atop the cliff. He climbs it and falls down, when he wakes up Fiona is bandaging his wounds. Irvine's Command Wolf performance was downgraded by 30%. Van finds Zeke and the Shield Liger. Zeke fuses with the Shield Liger and attempts to kill Van. Then Irvine shows up and traps the Shield Liger against the side of the raised cliff. Zeke escapes and Van chases him on the hover board. After a little organoid vs boy duel. Zeke falls down the cliff and Van catches him by the face. At this time, Zeke realizes that Van is a true friend and returns to normal.
10	"The Mountain of Dreams (Mountain of Dreams)" (Japanese: 夢の降る山)	November 6, 1999	March 1, 2002
After getting Zeke back to normal, Van learns that there is an old scientist who was important in the Republican Army and lives here. He might give a lead about Zoid Eve. As they move through the forest they hear an explosion. They come to a house with a man frozen in ice. It is revealed that Fiona likes here coffee salty. Later that morning, Dr. D is gone and is using Irvine's Command Wolf. He tells Irvine that the site of the main gun was off by exactly three degrees. Dr. D tricks Van into doing all of his housework. Otherwise, he will not tell him what Zoid Eve is. Dr. D then confronts Irvine and tricks him into doing more work. He tells both Van and Irvine to get in their zoids because the so-called enemy was coming, his grandson on a bike. Irvine's finger slips thanks to Dr. D. Then the old guy takes them on a suicide mission to an unmanned Republican supply base that was protected by several sleeper Guysacks. Van and Irvine become trapped and Van asks Dr. D about Zoid Eve, the doc smoothly replies he has never heard of it. Dr. D returns home after raiding the supply base. Suddenly, a sleeper Guysack comes after them, it had followed Dr. D there. It destroys his house, then Moonbay shows up and destroys the Guysack. Then Van and Irvine arrive after the place is already blown up. They all discuss Dr. D., Van, Irvine, Moonbay, Fiona, his grandson and Zeke. Dr. D's dream is to make it snow here so Van and Irvine help the Doctor make a machine that will make it snow. They launch the thing. It starts to snow a couple of minutes later, but Fiona and Moonbay notice that the machine had not started. It was really snowing.
11	"The Fog at Isolina (In the Fog of Iselina)" (Japanese: イセリナの霧の中で)	November 13, 1999	March 4, 2002
After making it snow, Van and the rest head off to Mount Iselina. Mount Iselina is known for being treacherous. Meanwhile, Viola and Jarro are making plans to attack and get revenge on Van. In the middle of the fog of Mount Isolina, Van stops everyone so he can get his flying papaya, Irvine and Fiona go after him and get lost. Moonbay tells Van about the Shadow Monster story. Then some sort of Shadow Monster appears, it turns out that it was just the shadow of a Godos that was being piloted by a girl named Rosa. Viola and Jarro strategize that those punks (Van) would be at the colony that is in the middle of Mt. Iselina. Rosa takes Van and Moonbay to her colony, and that is where Van stocks up on food. The villagers are surprised at what kind of strangers these people are. They are also fascinated at the zoids that they carry. Then, Van and Rosa talk for a while and exchange stories. Viola and Jarro get there; they did not want to attack the village so they lured Van into a foggy gorge. Van quickly takes out Jarro the Pteras pilot with the same maneuver that he took out Captain Herman, with cliff to cliff jump maneuver. He takes out Viola with the help of Rosa and the Godos. Then Rosa and Viola have a sister-to-sister talk and Van is surprised that Viola is the sister of Rosa. Van covers for Viola and then leaves. Then, Moonbay and Van find Irvine and Fiona and they leave.
12	"The Black Organoid (Black Organoid)" (Japanese: 黒のオーガノイド)	November 20, 1999	March 5, 2002
After getting away from the treacherous Mount Iselina, Van and the gang made it into Republican Territory. They make it to a village only after going through a zoid graveyard of 30 Guysacks. Van and the gang get in trouble as a few soldiers try to arrest them because they think it's someone else. Van and Fiona escape but Irvine, Moonbay and Zeke are caught. Then they are chased until they come across a boy lying down. The boy rescues them from the Republican Soldiers. More of them come, and as they are about to reach them, Fiona grabs the boy (who is just as old as Van/Fiona) and they make a break for it. Both Moonbay and Irvine are released due to a misunderstanding. Major Ford, leader and commander of this unit fills both Irvine and Moonbay in on the details. Two days ago, an entire sleeper battalion was whipped out because of one Saber Fang and a black organoid. A black organoid similar to Zeke had attacked them except it had wings instead of boosters. Raven (the boy) leads Van and Fiona to fresh water and asks them how is he can rescue their friends. Irvine gets to Van and warns him about Raven. By that time, the Republican Army has come in a small battalion of Godos'. Raven takes care of all of them. After that, Van takes on Raven and fights him. Raven is a superior fighter and defeats him but has enough sympathy to leave them be. He leaves Van with his broken pride.
13	"The Battle of Cronos (Fierce Battle! Fort Kronos)" (Japanese: 激戦! クロノス砦)	November 27, 1999	March 6, 2002
After Van loses to Raven, he sits down and says he's waiting until Raven shows up. Some of the villagers warn them of the advancing Imperial Army. Major Marcus tells Major Schubaltz of the new objectives and different strike plans. Major Marcus's unit will attack and capture the Chronos Fortress and the Schubaltz unit will advance on to Mount Osa Base. After snooping and sneaking around Irvine learns that even though the Republican Army is on the defensive, they have a bold strategy. After several attempts by Moonbay and Fiona, Van still does not want to go. He is trying to pull the full potential of the Shield Liger out. Meanwhile, in the village Raven explains the strategy to Major Schubaltz, and asks him why they could not merge their forces. It would be too overwhelming for the Republicans and might force the President to negotiate a ceasefire treaty between both nations. After his talk Raven leaves with his Saber Fang and Shadow. Van finds him and says that he wants a rematch. Irvine, as always, is standing by if Van needs help. For a couple of seconds, it looked like Van has the match under control, but then Raven, still being the superior pilot, quickly figures his strategy out and rips the dual-gun mounted on the Shield Liger off. Then Irvine comes charging in but Raven takes him out easily enough. Van puts up his Shield and charges for Raven; he hits his Saber and Raven goes down. He then fused with his black organoid, shadow. He takes Van out with one blow and after that Zeke is hurt pretty bad. The Chronos Fortress falls and blows itself up along with the part of Marcus's unit.
14	"Wake Up! Zeke! (Wake Up Sieg!)" (Japanese: めざめろジーク!)	December 4, 1999	March 7, 2002
After Van loses the battle to Raven again, we find out that Zeke is hurt badly this time. Colonel Krueger knows it's a huge blow losing the fortress, but he wants to know how much time it would take them to start advancing again. He estimates about thirty hours and tells Major Ford of Chronos Unit that he should return to Mount Osa Base and prepare for a counter-attack. Meanwhile, at the deserted village Van seeks help for Zeke. Dr. D shows up trying to find sunscreen and Van gets Dr. D to see Zeke. Dr. D. tells Van that to revive Zeke he would have to go to Mt. Osa and get a bright blue rock called Zoid Magnite. Irvine goes to the Republican Base to get armed with a multiple missile diffusion systems. He gets to test it out. Van and Moonbay make it to Mt. Osa Volcano and are struggling to keep alive and get the rock. In the meantime, Irvine takes on Raven and his Saber Fang with his multiple missile diffusion system. Van tells Moonbay he see the rock and she should lower him down. He gets the rock and gets pulled up and both Van and Moonbay get out of there with a second to spare. Irvine traps Raven with the needle missiles and Raven fuses with his organoid and takes out Irvine in a flash. Meanwhile, the combined forces of the Schubaltz and Marcus unit make their way to Mount Osa Base.
15	"Deploy the ZG! (Activate ZG!)" (Japanese: ZG発動!)	December 11, 1999	March 8, 2002
After Van finally revives Zeke with the Zoid Magnite, Zeke needs some time to recover. Major Schubaltz joins and the Imperial unit is delayed due to an avalanche of rocks. The delay is really severe they are delayed at least 2 hours. Marcus believes that it had to have been a fluke. Major Schubaltz on the other hand believes this was no fluke, it was the work of Colonel Krueger and that he knew exactly what he was doing. The severe losses due to the Chronos Fortress and this delay with rocks was no fluke. It starts to rain and the roof starts leaking where Van and the others are at. Colonel Krueger gives the command of Mt. Osa base to Major Ford while he pilots the ZG (Gojulas) onto the front lines. At only fifty-percent of its true capability, the ZG still has firepower equivalent to twelve zoids. Irvine sneaks into the base and sees just what they are planning for the upcoming battle against the Empire. The advancing Imperial unit is caught by surprise with several sleeper Guysacks. The Iron Kong, under the control of Major Schubaltz, takes out all the Guysacks with just one round of its 70mm chain guns. Up above them under the cover of thick storm clouds, four Pteras' under the command of Captain Herman from Red River Base comes here to assist with the battle. Back at the deserted village Van asks Dr. D where he can find Irvine. With some reluctance Dr. D tells Van that he is at the Mount Osa Base. Van gets in the Shield Liger and runs off to rescue Irvine. While in the Mount Osa Base, Irvine and Colonel Krueger are having a pilot to pilot talk with each other about the zoids. Captain Herman arrives at the base with his Pteras squadron, but instead of Colonel Krueger, Captain Herman will be piloting the ZG. The advancing Imperial unit makes it to the Mount Osa Base and starts attacking them, but unfortunately, Colonel Krueger is caught in one of the rounds and is hurt. Fortunately, it's not bad. Herman jumps into the cockpit of the ZG and starts his one-zoid barrage against the Imperial Army. Van makes it to the base safely and rescues Irvine right before he falls to the ground. He also learns that he can access the power of the Shield Liger on his own. As Raven looks on, Herman takes out most of the Imperial Army forces, until Major Schubaltz starts retreating. After that Herman grounds the Gojulas.
16	"New Helic City (New Helic City)" (Japanese: ニューヘリックシティ)	December 18, 1999	March 11, 2002
There's a parade in New Helic City celebrating the Republicans' latest victory and Irvine, Moonbay, and Fiona watch it. Van and Zeke wander away and see a lone Imperial soldier being harassed by some Republicans. The Imperial soldier had escaped and was trying to get away from the city. Van feels that the right thing to do is to help him, so he and Zeke chase the Republicans away. The soldier runs away and drops a picture of him and his mother, and Van picks it up. He meets the others at a cafe and tells them what happened. Irvine leaves for a moment and Moonbay says that they should go to the institute that specializes in ancient ruins. Just then, a few trucks pull up with Republican guards in them and one of them is the person that Van and Zeke had chased away (he had told the guards about how Van helped the Imperial soldier). The guards accuse him of being an Imperial spy and do not believe that Hermann gave them their letter that he wrote for them. Irvine drives up in a jeep, throws a smoke bomb, and Van and the others get in and drive away with Zeke running after them. Irvine drives until one of the tires on his jeep is shot, and then they start running. The run into a dead end, but then a guy wearing a frog mask that covers his whole head pops out of the sewer. He takes them down into the sewer while a balloon is released to distract the guards. Irvine takes off the guy's mask and he turns out to be Dr. D! Dr. D takes them to the institute and they break in. They explore the building and find a huge rock pillar with ancient writing on it, like the one Fiona was looking at when she first said 'Zoid Eve', but Fiona does not remember anything and just gets a headache. Then they are surrounded and captured by Republican soldiers. Meanwhile, a large iceberg is headed towards the city. A lady informs the President (President Camford) about the prisoners, Hermann (her son), and the letter (they can not confirm if it's real because Herman is away checking out the iceberg). A guard laughs at Van and tells him that Zeke has been taken away and will be dissected. Van yells at him and then the President and the lady enter. Van yells at them too, but finds out that the old lady is the President and that Hermann is her son. The President sees Dr. D with them and lets them out. Later, Van and Zeke meet up happily and the President asks Dr. D to help out the Republic in the war, but Dr. D does not want to be dragged into another one. Van and the others are looking at the city when they see explosions. The Imperial soldier Van helped has stolen a powerful modified Command Wolf and is fighting some Republic zoids on the streets. Later, Van and the others look at the damage and Van becomes really angry, drops the soldier's picture, and runs off with Zeke. Meanwhile, the soldier is running away from the city when he sees a Shield Liger ahead of him. Van yells at him and the soldier attacks out of fear. Van blocks the shots with his shield, and then knocks him over with his shield and the guy is thrown out of the cockpit. The soldier runs, but Van leaps out of his zoid and chases after him. He jumps on the guy screaming and asking how he could do that. The guy says he was afraid and just trying to get away. Van nearly punches him and starts crying. Irvine and the others arrive and Irvine yells for the soldier to leave or else, and he does. Dr. D tells Van that he did the right thing by helping the soldier, because a life is a life. It does not matter if it's a Republican or Imperial one. Van still cries, though. Meanwhile, Hermann, in a Pteras with two other Pteras units, checks out the iceberg and shoots it to make sure everything's okay, but then he sees oil near the bottom of it. Missiles are launched from the iceberg and snow appears. Then the two other Pteras units are shot down and Hermann tries to contact New Helic City, but can not (due to the jamming snow). Hermann is then shot down. Beneath the iceberg, there is a large Imperial submarine. Inside the submarine is Prozen, planning an attack on New Helic City.
17	"The Longest Night of the Republic (The Longest Night of the Republic)" (Japanese: 共和国の一番長い夜)	December 25, 1999	March 12, 2002
As the Imperial Army is getting closer, Captain Herman is swimming really fast to warn their side about the attack from the Empire. While Van, Moonbay and Irvine are planning their next move to the Guerrial Plateau. They also find out a general in the Imperial Army also seeks it and will pay a large reward for any leads. Madam President drops in on the Mount Osa base to check on how Colonel Kruegar is doing. Lieutenant O'Connell of the Red River Base wants to send out a search party to look for the Captain. But the president denies their request. Irvine, Van, Moonbay and Fiona are having dinner while the Lieutenant drops in and is really mad, he says that he will pay anyone enough money from the military to retire if they would steal a Pteras and go rescue the Captain. While on the Imperial Side, Admiral Prozen was making his daily report to the Imperial King Zeppelin. They talked for a bit on how he was going to deal the final blow to the rebels. Then Van and Irvine alongside Moonbay and Fiona broke into the base and stole a Pteras to rescue the Captain. Van and Irvine both stayed at the shore in case the captain returned. Dr. D catches the three soldiers including Captain Rob Herman. Then Van and Irvine appear to rescue Captain Herman. Herman tells the girls that they should tell the Mt. Osa Base to about the attack. Irvine also runs off and Van/Herman go to a nearby Naval Base. Then Raven blows the Naval Base up and challenges him. Van accepts, and all the while Moonbay had made it to the Mount Osa Base. Irvine warns Major Ford who is piloting the Gojulas to make a retreat to the Helic capital, because these Imperial Troops were just trying to get the attention of the Rebels and the ZG. On the battlefield, Van and Raven are having a pretty nice zoid battle, until the Imperial Army decides to attack them. Then Van flees.
18	"The Defense of the City (Battle of the Capital)" (Japanese: 首都攻防)	January 8, 2000	March 13, 2002
Barely escaping and making it to the front lines at the New Helic Shore, the Republican Army stands and waits for the Imperial Army to attack. Prince Rudolph of the Empire has some bad news about his grandfather. While Prozen gives the Republican President a final ultimatum of surrender or be completely annihilated. Then the Republican Army finds out more bad news, Old Man Krueger, Moonbay and Fiona are still at the Mount Osa Base. Colonel Krueger has an idea of destroying the Mount Osa Base so the Empire can not get its hands on it. Moonbay, Fiona and the Colonel escape through the Pteras. But the explosives did not explode. So the Colonel comes thinks if he blows the Volcano up, the base would explode and all the combat systems on the zoids would freeze. Dr. D was also thinking the same thing. They would fly in with just a couple of Pteras alongside Van and Zeke. Rudolph is informed the current emperor Zeppelin passes away at exactly 11:00 AM. Then Colonel Krueger, Fiona and Moonbay launch the missiles and fail, they needed more missiles if they were going to pull this off. Then Raven shows up with his Saber Fang and blasts them. Van and Raven duke it out then Dr. D and his members of the Pteras team make the Volcano explode and the base explodes along with Marcus. Then Prince Rudolph orders an immediate ceasefire between both nations. Then in the fight, Van had managed to destroy Raven's Saber Fang, but Shadow pulls Raven out of the Saber Fang before it explodes. The Imperial Army starts retreating and the Republicans pull a strategic victory over the Empire.
19	"Prozen's Conspiracy (Proizen's Conspiracy)" (Japanese: プロイツェンの陰謀)	January 15, 2000	March 14, 2002
After stopping the war and making the Empire retreat peace was restored to the Republic. Van and his friends were off to the Guerrial Plateau to restore Fiona's memory. While at an Imperial Prison Cell, where the bandit Rosso has been residing for the past couple of weeks, is freed with the help of his comrades from the Desert Alcavaleno Gang. Since the death of the late emperor Zeppelin, Crown Prince Rudolph is next in line to become emperor of the Empire. Minister Prozen also mourns the loss of his emperor. Minister Prozen, as regent to Crown Prince Rudolph, would become emperor if anything were to happen to Prince Rudolph. The Desert Alcavaleno Gang is planning on kidnapping the Crown Prince Rudolph and asking for a ransom from the Empire for treating them the way they did. Late at night, Minister Prozen went to a shabby shop where a special forces operative commander by the name of Metlenick was. Metlenick had arranged three republican command wolves to assure that the assassination would look like the republicans had done it to re-new the war. Minister Prozen gives the details of how Rudolph would leave the palace. He would be flying in a Redler guarded by two or three Rev. Raptors basic models at that. The mission would be to take Rudolph out as quickly as possible and most importantly make it look like the Republicans had done it. Rosso and Viola are scoping out the palace while a person from the special forces operative spots them, and tells his boss Metlenick and tails them. Rosso and Viola make it to their hideout but Metlenick's group launches a missile right into their hideout, assuming that they are dead Metlenick resumes his mission. Fortunately, all four of them had gotten into their Molga. The Desert Alcavaleno gang finds Metlenick's hideout and they also learn they are doing a serious co-operative mission to make it look like the rebels had done it. They hit the Command Wolves and knock them all into a Frozen Combat System. Rosso and Viola attack the palace, get Prince Rudolph, and head back to the Iron Kong. Rosso also learns Metlenick's mission was to take out the Prince Rudolph. Van and the gang make it near the Guerrial Plateau only four more days until they get there.
20	"The Resurrection Monster (Revived Demon Beast)" (Japanese: 蘇る魔獣｣)	January 22, 2000	March 15, 2002
A scientist talks to Minister Prozen about the loading process of the new type zoid they had found and the other zoid to which they had made alterations to its zoid core. Van and the rest were going to the Guerrial Ruins. Meanwhile, Rosso and Viola were safe for the time being, they were not chased by the Imperial Army. They planned to ransom the prince to the highest bidder in the Empire. After such a long and hard struggle from the palace to the desert, Rudolph was fast asleep. Rosso and Viola were about to have dinner, but then Rudolph starts to escape. Van, Moonbay, Irvine and Fiona had made it to the Guerrial Plateau and started searching around the ruins. They had split up, Van/Fiona/Zeke went one way and Moonbay/Irvine went around the other way. They had learned that someone had recently been here, after crossing a trapped line, Irvine and Moonbay were chased all over the ruins by a Rev Raptor. Then the same had happened to Van, Fiona and Zeke. Barely hiding from the Rev Raptor, Irvine learned the movements of these zoids were sluggish and they had to be sleeper zoids, later he was able to confirm that by spotting its computer in the cockpit. Irvine also discovers that they had to be programmed not to fire, because it would damage the ruins. Van and Fiona were still running from the Rev Rapter and were cornered by the Rapter, they jumped off the cliff and the Shield Liger w/Zeke had rescued them. Then with a few swift moves, Van takes out all the Rev Raptors with the Liger's shield. Meanwhile, Rosso is having an exchange with Metlenick, Rudolph for money. He gets the money but throws it back and takes Rudolph again. Viola backs them up and they escape. Meanwhile at the ruins, after touching one of the stone tablets, Fiona remembers something called Death Saurer. Later at the Prozen's scientific lab, he calls in Raven and gives him a new type of zoid with modifications to its Zoid Core.
21	"The Charged Particle Gun (Charged Particle Cannon)" (Japanese: 荷電粒子砲)	January 29, 2000	March 18, 2002
Raven starts to rush after Rosso and enters a punk guys territory called Brad. Raven is then mocked by Brad. Then Raven takes Brad out and crushes his Dark Horn. Later Van and the rest discussed how it was a waste of time, and Irvine states that Fiona remembered something called Death Saurer. Van kicks a rock in the bush and finds a boy named Rudolph. Rosso and Viola can not find Rudolph anywhere and went searching for him. Moonbay tries to swindle Rudolph out of his Imperial Ring but Van cancels that transaction. While at the Imperial Palace, Prozen gives a magnificent speech on how, if Prince Rudolph does not return before the funeral of the late emperor Zeppelin, he would take office. A fast zoid attacks through the cover of the forest, Viola goes to check it out and it turns out it's Raven in a Geno Saurer (purple/dark purple/black). Rosso was coming to but he'd be a little late. Rudolph was just leaving and was stopped when Fiona creeped everyone out with her little forewarning. Raven arrives and launches his Charged Particle Cannon at Viola and launches another between the Command Wolf and Shield Liger, knocking them down. Raven attacks Van and Irvine, but it proves too much for the heroes. His zoid is much stronger than any of theirs. The Shield Liger's ultimate move had no effect against the Charged Particle Cannon. Rosso and Viola arrive in the Iron Kong and try to hold off Raven so Van can escape. Raven destroys the Iron Kong and then stops his pursuit of Van and Rudolph. He said it would be more challenging if he gave them a head start.
22	"Farewell to a Friend (Buddy's Death!?)" (Japanese: 相棒の死!?)	February 5, 2000	March 19, 2002
After barely escaping from Raven, Van and the rest find some shelter. Rudolph wakes up and was having a bad dream and wonders if he will ever return home. Later that morning, Rudolph asks if they could take him to Guygalos and teach him how to pilot a zoid. At the palace, Minister Prozen is sending out search parties and they are still looking for the prince as he explains to Prime Minister Homalef. A whole herd of Rev Raptors and Redlers are searching for the prince, but were taken down by Raven and his Geno Saurer. Van starts teaching Rudolph how to pilot a zoid properly but Rudolph needs more practice. Then he gives Rudolph some special zoid pilot training. They find a bunch of Imperial Redlers with their Zoid Cores ripped out and Dr. D believes the Death Saurer was responsible for the damage and ruins of the Redlers. Dr. D tells everyone about the Legend of Beast of Destruction, the Death Saurer. It goes: One Death Saurer, destroyed a platoon of 1,000 zoids and wiped out a whole nation in one night. They figured that Raven has the Death Saurer, and is using its power to destroy the Redlers. In the middle of the night, Van could not sleep because of the Death Saurer and Rudolph was about to run away. He was stopped as Van stood in his way. They also find out that Rudolph is the next in line for the imperial throne. Rudolph also tells about the ambitions that Prozen has to rule the empire and take control of it. Shadow, Raven's black organoid, shows up and kidnaps Rudolph. Then Rev Raptors show up, dozens of them. Irvine gets in his Command Wolf and Moonbay gets in the Gustav and takes them on. While Van goes after Raven, he learns that Raven's new zoid is a Geno Saurer not a Death Saurer. Raven takes Van on and in a couple of minutes, with the Charged Particle Gun, Raven blows the Shield Liger's core into smithereens. Fortunately, Zeke escapes with Van, but the main point was that the Shield Liger had drawn its last breath.
23	"The Imperial Ring (Emperor's Ring)" (Japanese: 皇帝の指輪)	February 12, 2000	March 20, 2002
Since the Shield Liger was destroyed, Van had fused with Zeke right before it was completely gone. Dr. D and Fiona get Van to regain consciousness; meanwhile Raven delivers Rudolph to Metelinick and his thugs. Dr. D, Irvine and Van come up with a bold plan to get Rudolph back and Van goes off with Irvine to get him back. They are going to use Van as a decoy and then when gets Rudolph on to the hover board and then Irvine will launch an assault from up above using his 60 mm Long Range Cannon. Van and Rudolph get away while Irvine sustains some damage by the Dark Horns. Van makes a couple of snazzy turns and they get into a mine. Metelinick and his thugs were right behind them. In the mines Van and Rudolph are being shot at, but give them the slip for a couple of minutes and start to climb a ladder. This time they are caught again and Irvine sames them with a couple of smoke bombs and then they get caught again, this time Van fell into a ditch and jumped up off of some-sort of trampa line as he rises he knocks Metelinick over but his friends try to save him and are left in a tight spot. While at the campsite, Fiona starts hearing a voice calling her name. At the mines, Van had given Rudolph his ring back and were looking for a way out. Irvine made it out, but Van and Rudolph were still inside. Then Van took Rudolph after he blinded Metelinick's guys by the stun bomb, into a cart and flew right into the River. But after they got out, two Dark Horns came at them, but Irvine had knocked all of them out easily with teaching them a lesson in maneuverability. At the campsite, where Fiona had fused with Zeke and left right into the remains of the Shield Liger trying to resurrect the Shield Liger.
24	"A Voice from Afar (Distant Call)"	February 19, 2000	March 21, 2002
After Van had brought Rudolph back to the campsite away from danger, he had seen the whirlwind of light surrounding the Shield Liger. Before where Metelinick and his thugs were left because of the damage they had suffered due to Irvine's Command Wolf. They had just finished repairing the damage on one Dark Horn and the other would need at least a week to recover. Then a Red Guysack shows up and a guy called Stinger a.k.a. The Fisherman shows up. Meanwhile, Van demands an explanation for what's happening to the Shield Liger. He finds out that Fiona and Zeke are still inside and he tries running into it but gets thrown away by the massive energy that was being put out. Van then runs off because he wanted Zeke to choose him, and wondered why he chose Fiona instead. Stinger makes a deal with Metelinick in which he'll help with the destruction of the cocky-group of punks with the organoid. Rudolph makes it over to where Van had gone off, by some nearby ruins. Denis was given the Red Guysack, to keep an eye on Van, and do whatever is necessary to keep him away from the Whirlwind of Light. Meanwhile, Stinger makes a plan, in which the 2 remaining Dark Horns will attack him in order to fool Moonbay and the others so they would trust him. In return he would poison their food so they would be paralyzed for a number of days. His plan works perfectly, except Rudolph does not drink the soup he just gets caught. At the ruins, Van starts to hear Fiona's voice and she gives him a message to go back, while on the move Van is caught off guard by the Red Guysack.
25	"The New Liger (New Liger [New Liger])" (Japanese: 新ライガー （ニューライガー）)	February 26, 2000	March 22, 2002
After Van starts returning to the campsite, he is attacked by Denis in the Red Guysack, Denis tries to overtake him, but Van manages to win by opening the cockpit of the Guysack and knocking Denis out then taking the Guysack to fight at the other two. Then Stinger has all three, Irvine, Moonbay, and Rudolph tied on a pole and is playing some sick games with their heads. Later, Stinger reveals he was not doing this for fun, he had a defined objective all along. He wanted Zeke for himself, and whatever else he could his hands on. Stinger then tells Irvine to call out the organoid, but Irvine tells Stinger, Zeke would never take orders from him or Moonbay. He would only obey Van. Meanwhile, Van had just started a fight with the Dark Horn piloted by Rhoto. Van takes him out with an attack from underneath and leaves. At the whirlwind of light, Dr. D comes out and punches Stinger and Metelinick. Then Metelinick gets inside the Dark Horn and starts to attack Rudolph, and just as he is about to hit Rudolph, Van shows up in the Red Guysack. Then Stinger comes out in a Light Pink Saber Fang completely loaded up with ammunition and takes out the Guysack easily. Then Rudolph starts using Irvine's Command Wolf and attacks Stinger. In an attack from the Saber Fang, Van is thrust into the whirlwind of light where the Shield Liger is resurrected as the new and improved Blade Liger. With one move it takes out Stinger and then Metelinick escapes in the Dark Horn with Imperial Ring of Guylos. Moonbay winds up punching Stinger in the face, and both Fiona and Zeke make it back after resurrecting the Shield Liger.
26	"Memories of Zi (Memories of Zi)" (Japanese: Ziの記憶)	March 4, 2000	March 25, 2002
After defeating Stinger, and his Saber Fang Stinger Special, Van and the rest continue their journey to Guygalos. Metelinick gives Minister Prozen, the Ring of Guylos. Then Van and the guys are talking about how they are going to return Rudolph to Guygalos. Stinger makes it to a bar in a village, where he tells the Crossbow Brothers to immediately make their way to where Van and the rest of the gang are in Desert Heldigunners. Dr. D finds out Fiona is an Ancient Zoidian, a lost race of people that were thought to have been annihilated long ago by the Death Saurer. Meanwhile, Raven is heading off to destroy another fortress of the Republican Army. At the palace, Minister Prozen announces to everyone Rudolph has been assassinated by an elite squadron of Republican forces and then takes the throne. Raven attacks with the Geno Saurer and the fortress responds with several Gordos, but Raven was unharmed, and within 3 minutes the base in complete ruin. Then the cores of the zoids were ripped out and taken away. Moonbay and the others were traveling, as the Desert Heldigunners under the command of the Crossbow Brothers take out Zeke but Zeke escapes and fuses with the Blade Liger. The Command Wolf was attacked by the mini-blades on the tails of the Desert Heldigunners. Van takes them out with ease using the combination of the booster and blade attack. Meanwhile, at Prozan's Ancient Ruin Study Lab, they put in some Zoid Cores to awaken the Death Saurer.
27	"The Saviour (Man Who Helped)" (Japanese: 助けた男)	March 11, 2000	March 26, 2002
After taking out the Desert Heldigunners and getting Zeke back safe and sound, Van and the rest are trying to make it to the capital without any of the Imperials spotting him. Moonbay and the others are making their way through a village a called Light Town, where they learn Prozen has announced Rudolph is dead. Then, if that was not bad enough, they have a road block set up just in case Van and the others run by. They come up with a plan to smuggle Rudolph past Light Town and into the heart of Imperial territory. Moonbay and Fiona are in the Gustav, while Irvine, Rudolph, Van and Zeke are making their way past the mountains on foot. Moonbay decides to act like she's getting married and succeeds after lying half a dozen times. Later, the soldier in command finds out they were being tricked, and Irvine, Rudolph, Van and Zeke were on foot making their way through the mountains. Irvine hears the engine of maybe two or three Redlers in the vicinity and tells them to be cautious. The Redlers deploy things called "Realgas." As Irvine was warning the guys, Rudolph falls down the cliff onto a smaller cliff. Van, Irvine and Zeke rescue Rudolph, but they could not use Zeke's thrusters because it might cause a landslide which may also give away the location of where they are at. They eventually get caught by the Realgas and are put in a cell here they are taking pictures of them. Moonbay gets stuck in the desert because her gets caught in a sticky situation. Later at night, after Van, Irvine, and Rudolph are trapped inside a cage, they are rescued by the same guy that Van had helped in New Helic City. They return for Zeke and are spotted, they start running and the guy gets them out. Van and Irvine along with Rudolph and Zeke make it out there. While the soldier makes his own tracks and plunges into the river and makes it to freedom. Just as they thought they were in the clear, a whole herd of Rev Raptors were pursuing them and Moonbay had just arrived at the location. Van and Zeke make it into the Blade Liger, and they completely annihilate all the Rev Raptors.
28	"Run, Wolf! (Run Wolf)" (Japanese: 走れウルフ)	March 18, 2000	March 27, 2002
After they made it out of the treacherous mountains, Irvine and Van are traveling somewhere. Where they have a flashback about what happened up to the point. Rudolph was dressed up as a girl called Ramona to hide his true identity. Van finds out bandits here, dressed as Imperial soldiers, are robbing the village of everything and bring the cost of food up. Back to reality, Van and Irvine were still traveling and Irvine has two flashbacks, one where it was long ago maybe ten or fifteen years ago, Irvine had sister named Helena. The second flashback consists of Irvine and Moonbay running away from some soldiers, who are thinking they are and its. They go off and hide in a church where Sister Alena sticks a gun at Moonbay and Irvine. Van and the rest find out much about the really sick kids are being infected by a disease called Gafki-Carl Fever, but the only problem is the vaccine was taken by some bandits. While staring at the boy Peter, who is comforting his sisters hands, Irvine recalls himself in Peter's location and Helena in Rosa's place. Irvine volunteers to recover the vaccine. He also tell Van the story about his sister and that she died of Gafki-Carl Fever. They make it to the bandits' territory and the plan is Van will draw them out and keep them engaged in battle until Irvine sneaks in and gets the vaccine. Van faces off against Rev Raptors and destroys most of them. Then Irvine makes it into the base and starts looking for the vaccine. Then the Red Horns start charging out, and attacking Van. Knowing Van, he overdoes it and makes everyone retreat into the hideout. The Red Horn leader finally learns what their objective was attacking their fortress. He launches a missile at Irvine, but Van and the Blade Liger, intercept it. Irvine gets in the Command Wolf and leaves but is caught by surprise by a Rev Rapter. Van comes around after he wasted the bandits in their territory and picks Irvine up and returns in time to give them the vaccine. Meanwhile, Raven had taken out another fortress with a bunch of Gordos.
29	"Heroes of the Sky (Hero of the Sky)" (Japanese: 大空の勇者)	March 25, 2000	March 28, 2002
Dr. D and some Republican officers are waiting for two people to arrive. They see a truck in the distance, and wait for it to arrive. They then let the two people, a man and a woman, get into two Storm Sworders. The Storm Sworders are launched into the sky, and then they fly off. Meanwhile, Van and the others are traveling towards Guygalos City. Van and Irvine have a fight about which route to take, which ends up with Irvine strangling Van. After a long discussion, they decide to split up, with Irvine, Moonbay, and Rudolph taking the long but safe route, and Van, Fiona, and Zeke taking the shorter route that has one Imperial base along the way. They split up, and shortly after that, it turns out that Rudolph snuck into the Blade Liger so he could go with Van. At the Imperial base along Van's path, Major Karl Schubaltz is training with three black Redlers. He does some impressive maneuvering and shooting in his modified Saber Fang. Later, he and some other Imperial officer are talking about Prozen and what they think about the Empire. Then they go into the base, where they detect Van's Blade Liger running along in the distance. Karl recognizes Zeke from when Van, in the Shield Liger, and the organoid ran past him in a battle. Black Redlers are sent out to attack Van, and Fiona manages to contact the base. Rudolph talks to them, and Karl, being the only smart person in the ENTIRE Imperial army, recognizes that Rudolph is not a fake. Rudolph remembers Karl, and they start talking, but the rest of the Imperial officers still think he's a fake. They cut off the transmission and seize Karl to restrain him. Meanwhile, Irvine and Moonbay wonder if Van and the others are alright, and Raven destroys some more zoids and moves deeper into Republican territory. Shadow sees something in the sky, which turns out to be the two Storm Sworders from before. The two pilots, which are really Rosso and Viola, get a transmission from Dr. D and the Republican officers instructing them to return, but they turn off their radios and basically steal the two zoids. They then fly off at top speed to find Rudolph. Van's trying the best he can to fight the black Redlers, but he's not doing to well. Fiona tells him that they should seek cover in the forest, so Van heads for it. Zeke gets hit while trying to follow, and Van stops to go back for him. Then three Redlers are about to attack him head-on, but another tries to attack Van from behind. When it is about to hit him, it is shot down by the two Storm Sworders. The two pilots introduce themselves as the heroes of the sky, and then proceed to tear up all the Redlers. Van flees, followed by the two Storm Sworders, who contact Van and ask him if Rudolph is okay. Van and the others do not recognize the two pilots, even though it is obvious who they are. The Imperial officers at the base want to go after Van, but Karl breaks away and hits the self-destruct button for the base, letting Van escape. Van then meets up with Irvine and Moonbay, and Irvine says that he was right and Van was wrong because Van was attacked on the route he took, so now they have to go where Irvine thinks they should. Van does not agree so Irvine starts to strangle him again.
30	"Moonbay's Waltz (You [Mumbay] Waltz)" (Japanese: 君（ムンベイ）のワルツ)	April 1, 2000	March 29, 2002
Van and the gang are being chased by Captain Sephers' unit, and then McMahon a wealthy man rescues them. He takes them to his mansion, where Moonbay finds out that it was him. McMahon discusses the best strategy to get the Prince back to the castle. Later, Captain Sephers shows his ugly face again, and this time, he points a gun at McMahon and tells him that they will search his house. McMahon tells him that they will not and that they will leave immediately. After Sephers leaves, Moonbay puts on a dress that McMahon had given to her and they had one final dance. Then Van makes a decision that would benefit Moonbay, by leaving her at the mansion with McMahon. Just when Van and Irvine are about to leave, Moonbay shows up. Then they have a little talk until Captain Sephers' unit arrives. The come and tell McMahon that he had better hand over the impostors or would take in McMahon too. Then McMahon brings out his specially equipped Dark Horns with two 70 mm cannons. He knocks out almost all of the ground troops. Then Van and Irvine take out the other remaining ground troops, and the Storm Sworders come and take out all the Black Redlers. After all the chaos ended, Moonbay left and kissed McMahon one last time.
31	"The Three Guards (Three Knights)" (Japanese: 三人の騎士)	April 8, 2000	April 1, 2002
While on their way towards the Imperial Capital Guygalos, Van and the rest of the gang had fought their way through Captain Sepher's Unit. Then after that, the gang is making its way through the Valley of Heroes. While in the Wind City, the Imperial Army had laid waste to all of the city. The three guards came after the Imperial soldiers, piloting three old model Saber Fangs. Laying waste to the entire Imperial Division within a matter of moments. The three guards had gotten their revenge for them destroying the city. At home, Major Bord had come to tell the three guards that a group of bandits (Van, Zeke, etc.) were carrying an impostor Prince Rudolph and that they should immediately be thwarted. Then the three guards rushed off and found Van, he told them to meet them in the fighting grounds. Irvine went up first and knocked out one of the Saber Fang's. Then Van went against the second, beat him but at the cost of his boosters. He fought the third one and it came down to a draw fight with no weapons. Van still won, but by luck. The last guard got distracted.
32	"The Doom Machine (Beasts of Destruction)" (Japanese: 破滅の魔獣)	April 15, 2000	April 2, 2002
Van and the rest of the gang made it to the palace where Prime Minister Homalef was. After Prime Minister Homalef spotted Prince Rudolph, he could not believe his eyes. After they got to the minister's Palace, Homalef told them that Prozen also was in search of some ruins. Later that night, Van, Fiona, and Zeke snuck off in the Blade Liger to go to see the nearby facility that was once ancient ruins. As soon as Van arrived he was caught by Prozen and they both had an argument. Fiona got out and the Deathsaurer started to awaken. Prozen quickly realized that Fiona is of the Ancient Zoidian race. The Death Saurer awakened and came out after completely destroying the ruins. Van and the Blade Liger put their boosters on all the way. On their way back to help out their friends at the palace, they were greeted by Shadow, Raven's organoid and the deadly Raven himself with his deadly Geno Saurer.
33	"The Battle for Survival (Showdown of Destiny)" (Japanese: 宿命の対決)	April 22, 2000	April 3, 2002
On his way back to help Moonbay and the others at the palace, Van was confronted by Raven and his Genosaur. In a vicious battle that at one point was thought to be won by Raven. Van somehow managed to draw energy into the busted Blade Liger. While at the palace, Irvine, Rudolph, Moonbay and Prime Minister Homalef left the palace with a Saber Fang, Command Wolf and a Gustav. After the Baron of Wings (Rosso) and the Sword of Storms showed up, they took Rudolph to the Imperial Capital. Then Van had taken out all of the main external guns of the Genosaur. All he had left was one blade and all Raven had left was the charged particle gun. Then, Zeek and Fiona fused with the Liger thereby returning the Blade Liger to 100% with all damages gone. Raven fired the Charged Particle Gun and Van neutralized it with blades of the Blade Liger. The blades on the Blade Liger give off electrons that neutralize the Charged Particle Gun. By doing so, Van defeated Raven.
34	"The Capital Ablaze (Imperial City Burns)" (Japanese: 帝都炎上)	April 29, 2000	April 4, 2002
Prozan causes havoc amongst the people of the Empire when he wipes out a gaul of Shield Liegers whilst showing off the Death Saurer. Van Flyheight and his Blade Liger try to disarm the Death Saurer resulting in more chaos and destruction. After several attempts from all sides the Death Saurer is destroyed by the Blade Liger. Rudolph gains a new post as the Emperor of the Glorious Guylos Empire and the episode ends with Van and Fiona riding away in the Blade Liger in the search of Zoid Eve.

== Season 2 (Guardian Force) ==
No.	Title	Original air date	English air date
35	"The Secret Mission (Top Secret Order)" (Japanese: 極秘指令)	May 6, 2000	April 5, 2002
After defeating the Deathsaurer, Van joined the military and has been working in the military for the past year. Van under the guidance of Colonel Krueger, goes in a simulation test without the use of an organoid. He goes up against a herd of Command Wolves and Pteras'. He takes them out with ease. The President of the Republic gets a friendly warning from Emperor Rudolph. A highly mobile and super fast underground zoid attacked and destroyed the main bases of both the Empire and Republic. Van Flyheight, returns home to the Wind Colony. Later On, Van had gone out reminiscing about how he found Zeke and Fiona in same ruins a couple of years earlier. While Fiona is on her way to the Wind Colony with a sick Dr. D, are hit by the Stealth Viper. Van goes and helps Fiona and Dr. D. While at the Colony, Fiona and Dr. D are treated by the Priest and should make a complete recovery.
36	"The Sniper (Sniper)" (Japanese: スナイパー)	May 13, 2000	April 8, 2002
Van is told that soldiers are after the Republican gold. He goes to the city and has lunch with the Republican Commander. The commander tells them that they are indeed searching for something. They are searching for explosives that had fallen of during the war. Since they could not do much in the past they started doing it now. Van then leaves the restaurant with Fiona and the clever boy he is, he knows he is being followed by someone. He tells Zeke to go ahead and asks the guy to come out. It turns out that he is military police or it seems so. He tells Van that they are actually looking for gold and that they are planning to find and sell it in the Empire. He then shows them his partner, the Gun Sniper. Showtime, Van follows Commander Cunningham and monitors them. They had Command Wolves resting in the back to take out the Blade Liger if he makes a move. Unknown to Van, the military officer is actually in cahoots with Commander Cunningham.
37	"The Blue Devil (Blue Devil)" (Japanese: 青い悪魔)	May 20, 2000	April 9, 2002
Van and Fiona go to a nearby village, where Captain O'Connell and his men found a whole truck load of stone tablets which may lead to Zoid Eve. When Van had gotten there, a Godos had gotten out of control and attacked Fiona. Van jumped in his Blade Liger, and used long range machine gun to target the Godos, as he was doing this, he had a vision that showed him if he fired he would've killed Fiona. Zeke rescues Fiona and Van destroys the Godos. Later on, the Village was put under some kind of spell and they had emptied out. Van, Fiona and Zeke had gone to the bell tower and found a girl in blue clothes and had blue hair called Reice. She attacked Van and Van flipped her out and was about to knock her out when Fiona stopped him. Fiona told him that she was frightened and she did not know what she was doing. Later, Van, Fiona, Reice and Zeke went by the ruins and they found out that the stone tablets were gone, and Van was attacked by some small mechanical bugs.
38	"The Steel Bison (Steel Buffalo)" (Japanese: 鋼鉄の野牛)	May 27, 2000	April 10, 2002
Van is told by Captain O'Connell, that he will be going to Imperial Territory, because a couple of thugs posed as Republican forces are terrorizing nearby villages. While he makes his way to this village, he will be accompanied by another Guardian from the Empire, Schubaltz. As Van leaves his Liger in the woods, he comes to town with Zeke and Fiona. On the way, Zeke becomes covered with red paint. Van makes his way all around town and finds that people near the farms are not evacuating. Then, Schubaltz shows up with his triple mini-shot cannon, 8-missile cluster, and 17-shot cannon Dibison. He sees that Zeke is red and demands to know what is he doing. Van tells him that he is Van Flyheight, and he has a silver organoid called Zeke, but there was an accident and that Zeke was covered with some paint. He then does not believe a thing until he grabs him by his shirt and sees his Guardian Force tag. Then Schubaltz fills him in on information about the attackers.
39	"The Invisible Enemy (Invisible Enemy)" (Japanese: 見えざる敵)	June 3, 2000	April 11, 2002
As Van and Fiona enter another town, they go to the security office, to get the briefing for their next mission, but when they enter, they find out that Thomas is already there. After a few moments of bickering and arguments, Van and Thomas decide that it is safe if they both go after the bad guys. During their briefing, they find out that a bunch of outlaws are in the mountains so that they woild not let trade go by. In a nice scheme to get the outlaws out, Thomas gets a Gustav and makes Beek operate it, while both he and Van are inside the Liger and Dibson. The outlaws attack as suspected, but when Van and Thomas get out, they find out that the enemy is using optical stealth. They also find out that the "outlaws story" was just a decoy so that Hiltz can do his ancient ruin digging. Van and Thomas go to their hideout, and just about when they are going to make their move, they are confronted by Hiltz and his organoid, Ambient.
40	"The Zoid Hunters (Zoid Hunting)" (Japanese: ゾイド狩り)	June 10, 2000	April 12, 2002
After Van and Thomas fight off the Helcats in the mountains across the border, Van gets word from his superiors that there are zoid hunters that are taking sleeper zoids because now that the war is over, they can take zoids and no one would notice. Also a whole battalion of sleepers were taken a couple of days ago. Anyway, the zoid hunters strike and unknowingly capture a sleeper Rev Raptor, Van is hiding in. Thomas tries to stop them, but the new recruit to the zoid hunting team, a familiar Command Wolf takes out Thomas with a single shot. Then they capture the Rev Raptor and return to base. Later, Van gets out of the Rev Raptor and searches the Whale King to see if he could find anything to what is happening. He is seen by one of the members of the zoid hunters and runs around a bit until he is caught by Irvine. Van is placed in a cell and later Irvine goes to check up on him. All the while, Thomas was stranded in the middle of nowhere.
41	"The Devil's Maze (Devil's Labyrinth)" (Japanese: 悪魔の迷宮)	June 17, 2000	April 15, 2002
It was raining and the First Division of Panzer unit in the Imperial Army made to a supply base that held more than 250 megatons worth of explosives. It was an urgent call made two days ago, and the commander of the first Panzer Division was no other than Karl Schubaltz. After checking part of the base, he was trapped with all his men. He found out that they were all being controlled by Reice. After long and hard fighting by Colonel Schubaltz, he gives in. Thomas calculates that the cooling valves have been closed so that there would be an explosion that would wipe out the respectful parts of both nations. In the morning, Thomas finds out that his brother is in there, and both him and Van go in to shut down Reice. Van goes in through without his Blade Liger on Zeke. Then Reice captures Fiona and uses her organoid, Specular to control the Iron Kong. Van and Thomas make great time until Thomas runs into his brother. Thomas starts a fight with the Kong.
42	"Raven (Raven)" (Japanese: レイヴン)	June 24, 2000	April 16, 2002
Episode starts out with a Godos being stolen and used to destroy its own base with a black organoid. In the morning, Van goes to check out the base, or whats left of the base. Van looks around the base and sees that it was a thorough job. Whoever did this did not want a trace of anything to be left behind. Then a survivor tells Van that this was done by a black organoid. Van thinks this could not be possible. He calls in Thomas Schubaltz. Van and Thomas had a talk with each other and Van filled in Thomas with all the details about the black organoid and Raven. Van thinks that it might be a mistake bringing Thomas into this mission. Meanwhile, in the desert at the time Raven was walking alone and a Gustav pulled up and gave Raven a ride and some water. Then Thomas says that taking Raven down would be a piece of cake, and that he would win. Raven is not the Raven that Van knew in Chaotic Century, he has been psychologically affected by the loss he received.
43	"The Emperor's Holiday (Emperor's Holiday)" (Japanese: 皇帝の休日)	July 1, 2000	April 17, 2002
After the fierce bout with Raven, Van decides to take a break with the Emperor himself, Rudolph. 7 Redlers carrying the Emperor to his one-day holiday. While watching with his comrades, Stinger Thomas finds out that Van is slacking off. Unknowingly, he gives Emperor Rudolph a noogie. Then Lady Marian, the girl that is supposed to wed Rudolph, shows up and starts yelling at Thomas. Stinger scopes the area out and sees that Van's Blade Liger is there. Marian also learns that Thomas is in love with Fiona. She helps out Thomas in trying to get Fiona's affection, they try several methods and none of them seem to work. While all this is going on, Stingers' flunkies the two with the desert Heldigunner zoids, plant explosives under the Redlers so when the lift off they would explode. They cause a distraction, and the Redlers lift off and explode. Then Van and Thomas hear the fire works, they try to head off to their zoids. While they are running, Zeke is caught in a net but not taken
44	"Assault of the Mega-Monster (Machine Beast Clash)" (Japanese: 機獣大激突)	July 8, 2000	April 18, 2002
Plot: After going head to head combat with Raven, Thomas's Dibison is completely totaled and barely makes it near to a familiar Gustav. Van does some simulation tests at a nearby base to prepare for Raven's arrival. The normal routine, couple of Pteras' and Command Wolves. Then in the middle of the simulation Irvine shows up in his Red Command Wolf, and challenges Van. After a vicious duel at the first, both Irvine and Van stop and try to wash on a nearby lake. Irvine tells Van that he made a heap of prize money in winning a couple of tournaments and then he relaxed for the past couple days at La Fray Beach. When he heard of Raven returning he started coming to this base. Then just before they are about to start Round 2 of their duel, Dr. D drops in with a parachute coming straight from the Wind Colony. He said that there was a way to strengthen the shield on the Blade Liger by at least 2 or 3 times. Unfortunately, Raven hammered his shield and before he was able to finish Van, Shadow took the Geno Saurer away from the battle. Raven was angered by this until he witnesses Shadow form an evolution cocoon around the Geno Saurer.
45	"The Wings of Darkness (Jet-Black Wings)" (Japanese: 漆黒の翼)	July 15, 2000	April 19, 2002
Two Stealth Storm Sworders (Triple SSS) were being brought to a Dragon Head Base near the Red River as a symbol for peace. Behind them was Mueller and Major Ralph from the Imperial Air Base Ebinar. Irvine and Van are taking Moonbay's Gustav to the Dragon Head Base, and are wondering why Raven did not finish him off when he had the chance. They find out it was not the Geno Saurer or Raven's will to leave the battlefield, instead it was Shadow's decision to leave. Then the Triple SSS are stolen by Major Ralph and Mueller with the help of Ambient, the red organoid that belongs to Hiltz. When Van and the rest of the gang make it to Dragon Head Base, they find out about the stolen Triple SSS's, and since it fell under Guardian Force headlines, it was their mission to stop them and bring them back. Van believes since the Triple SSSs are not yet equipped with Command Options, they will return for the Command Options. Then Van strategizes a complete and nice way to trap the Triple SSS when they come.
46	"Devil of the Sea (Undersea Devil)" (Japanese: 海底の悪魔)	July 22, 2000 (Note: The "epguides" website incorrectly lists the premiere as October 14, 2000.)	April 22, 2002
After taking back the Triple SSS's from Major Ralph and Mueller Van and Fiona are called toward Lumiere Island. It turns out that Dr. D brought them for a swim. After swimming around relaxing. Van starts to search for Fiona and has trouble finding her. Reice tortures Fiona by her psycho waves and plays mind games with her head. Dr. D shows Van the operations room in which all of his girls are doing the hard work of looking at the lost city of the Ancient Zoidians. Fiona is having terrible visions of her life. Dr. D tells Van about the legend on how the city will awake. When two moons are aligned just right, the sea level near the city will fall dramatically, and this only happens every 60 years. The Lost City is accessible for a short amount of time. The eclipse starts and the lost city is unveiled quite nicely. Reice starts attacking Van, first with a decoy Double Sworder and then with after trapping him underwater, with a Hammerhead.
47	"A Monster Awakens (Demon Beast Reborn)" (Japanese: 魔獣新生)	July 29, 2000	April 23, 2002
After returning from Lumiere Island and defeating the Hammerhead, Van had returned to a base near the Geno Saurer's cocoon. An Imperial soldier finds Raven by the Geno Saurer's cocoon. Then the rest of the Imperial soldiers come and arrest Raven. Raven was being interrogated by Major Schubaltz. Then everyone checks out the Geno Saurer's cocoon. The Geno Saurer is evolving but into what? The Republican and Imperial forces collaborate to destroy the cocoon. An all-out assault against the cocoon fails because the glowing cocoon protects and diverts all firepower away from it, the same would have happened if someone had launched an assault on the Shield Liger's cocoon. They were going to wait until the cocoon hatches and the Geno Saurer is reborn for their second assault. There was a fleet of zoids many mixes in the Imperial zoids, several Red Horns and Iron Kong surrounded by Molga and Heldigunner units.
48	"The Black Lightning (Black Thunder)" (Japanese: 黒い稲妻)	August 5, 2000	April 24, 2002
After suffering major losses at the hands of Raven, the Command Wolf was badly damaged. It was struck with a fatal blow to the Zoid Core, that like the heart. Irvine, pilot of the red Command Wolf, was hurt bad and was in the hospital bed from the last encounter with the Geno Breaker. Then Dr. D shows everyone the Lightning Saix, a new ultra-fast zoid that he was developing for the Empire. Its theories in capability were not enough for Thomas, he wanted to see a test run and that's exactly what he got. In the test run, it took out the Saber Fangs and Helcats within a couple of minutes. But the pilot had lost consciousness with the last launch of anti-zoid missiles and so he was ejected so that he would not get hurt. The Lightning Saix memory bank was damaged really bad. Irvine leaves his bed and goes off to check on his Command Wolf. In a conference, that Emperor Rudolph is holding near the base, where Irvine and the rest are at, the Madam President is traveling by a white Hammerhead.
49	"The Distant Stars (Distant Starry Sky)" (Japanese: 遠い星空)	August 12, 2000	April 25, 2002
After not faring so well against the Geno Breaker last time, this time they brought in Colonel Halford, used to work with Major Dan Flyheight (Van's Father), Halford is a complete jerk and lacks respect for anyone below him. He does have one good point that makes up for his ugly face, he is a Geno Breaker specialist. He analyzed all the aspects of the Geno Breaker, for example, it has a window of 1:05 seconds before it can recharge after the first Particle Beam. It also needs 5.33 seconds to charge the Particle Beam. In their strategy, they want to neutralize the foot locks of the Geno Breaker so it can not fire its Particle Beam. But he does not realize the Geno Breaker can fire from the air as well, it can use it thrusters mounted on the back, where the Pulse Laser Cannons once were, and boost and it would not need a recoil because it is in the air. Then, Thomas, Irvine and Van repeatedly do some exercise.
50	"Attack of the Geno Breaker (G [Genobreaker] Siege)" (Japanese: G（ジェノブレイカー）包囲網)	August 19, 2000	April 26, 2002
After training hard for the arrival of the Geno Breaker, Van had upgraded the booster on the Blade Liger. The upgraded booster made the Blade Liger faster than the Lightning Saix w/o a booster. Reice has a talk about the Geno-Breaker and why it is Red instead of being Dark Blue or Black. It seems that Hiltz must've done something to the previous Geno Saurer that made it come out Red. Also, Hiltz is not interested in either Van or Raven, he just wants who wins. Then Colonel Halford talks to the three pilots about the Geno-Breaker, and how it just finished attacking the Lightning Siax development plant of the Empire and its next target is this base. He also has a talk with Fiona, tells her to ask Thomas and Irvine to remove the electrical pulse generators and degrade the booster of the Blade Liger. He also tells Fiona after that she would be working with the ancient ruins study team again with him instead of this Guardian Force Team.
51	"The Boy from the Ruins (Boy in Ruins)" (Japanese: 遺跡の少年)	August 26, 2000	April 29, 2002
After fighting the Geno-Breaker and falling over a cliff into a river Van washes up in a shore. Irvine, Thomas, Fiona and Moonbay start looking for Van, and had been searching for hours without a trace of him, the Blade Liger nor Zeke. Fiona sensed that Van is in a valley, hurt and unable to move for the time being. Irvine and Thomas go into the valley, Irvine spots the Blade Liger and Zeke but no sign of Van though. Then Zeke tells Fiona the cockpit flew open and Van fell into the river. Van, alive and makes it to a village but the people there do not help him. Then after passing out Van gets some sort of dream. In a shock Van wakes up and finds a boy named Nichalo who helped patching him up and his zoid, T-roll. Van teaches Nichalo how to pilot T-roll really fast and smoothly. Meanwhile, the Imperial Army Division base is getting closer to the Village of Nordinance. Thomas does some research on the village, it turns out 10 years ago the Republican Army attacked and destroyed the village.
52	"Van's New Power (Power of Van)" (Japanese: バンの力)	September 2, 2000	April 30, 2002
After capturing Captain Sephers and healing up, Van and the newly repaired Blade Liger were ready for some action. The Blade Liger repairs were all completed. Van did a test run with the Blade Liger, and it turned out the Blade Liger was feeling kind of sluggish. Van found out after Dr. D explained to him, that all the motion systems were worn out on the Blade Liger when came here and it also seems that Van has been running the Blade Liger well beyond its capabilities, so now the Blade Liger is not good enough for Van anymore. Then Dr. D shows everyone some of the semi-functional boosters, that may increase the Blade Liger's potential. Moonbay tries to test the boosters out on her Gustav to see how they would work, but it did not work at all, it took the Gustav all over the place. Then Dr. D attaches some functional boosters to the Blade Liger. Before the test run, Fiona wanted to talk about something strange happening to Zeke. But Van told her he will address it after the test run.
53	"Phantom (Phantom)" (Japanese: ファントム)	September 9, 2000	May 1, 2002
After pulling out the full potential of Zeke and the Blade Liger, the Blade Liger has reached its absolute best under the piloting of Van. A couple of people who were conspiring to kill Emperor Rudolph were placed under arrest. Phantom, the assassin they hired is notorious and he has never missed his intended target or given up on an assignment. When he receives an assignment he thoroughly accomplishes it. Van and Thomas discover that the plot to kill emperor Rudolph will be carried out at the Guylos Grand Prix, the generals who still claim loyalty to Prozen want Emperor Rudolph dead. The Grand Prix attracts much attention from throughout Planet Zi. Moonbay, aka the Red Fireball, will make a grand return to the Grand Prix and is burning every opponent in sight except for one called Masquerade. Meanwhile, Phantom is in the harbor with his stealth Gun Sniper, where, unbeknownst to Van, a sniping shot can be made from the sea.
54	"G-File (G-File)" (Japanese: Gファイル)	September 16, 2000	May 2, 2002
After taking down Phantom, before he could kill Emperor Rudolph, Captain O'Connell and Colonel Herman examine the remains of the Gun Snipers that Van destroyed. Thomas and Beek were looking around at the place where the Geno Breaker was first born in search of residual radiation. They are wondering how a Gun Sniper could change shape with just fusing with an organoid. Colonel Schubaltz made it to the Dragon Head Base and they all, including Thomas, make it to the briefing. Dr. D started the briefing for the various enemies more than the Guardian Force had to deal with. Then Dr. D goes over the biographies of the following enemies they have had to tangle with. First they start with a man called Hiltz, then they go on to, Ambient, Reice, Specular, then finally Raven and Shadow. After that briefing was over, Fiona had done a special briefing of her own on the top members of the Guardian Force and analyzes the best tactics the Guardian Force can use against the Geno-Breaker.
55	"Supersonic Battle (Speed of Sound Duel)" (Japanese: 音速の決闘)	September 23, 2000	May 3, 2002
After somehow defeating the Whale King, Van and Thomas find themselves in a mystery. Some people are stealing zoid parts which are still being developed. The weapons have their clear advantage, after finding it out against a couple of Heldigunners. Meanwhile, a Gustav carrying stolen zoid parts from both respective nations stops after it drops some of its cargo. Irvine piloting the Lightning Saix sees they could use a hand and jumps out offering assistance. Irvine finds out what they are carrying and demands an explanation but before that happens, he gets knocked out. He turns on his one eye video piece. He captures the general's face and is later used for military intelligence. When Irvine wakes up he finds out he is being accused of stealing the zoid parts and also his Lightning Saix has been stolen. After the officer in charge denies every one of his statements, they board a militaristic brown Hammerhead.
56	"Cerberus (Cerberus)" (Japanese: ケルベロス)	October 7, 2000	May 6, 2002
A lone Iron Kong moves to a place with windmills. 3 Saber Fangs appear and declare the Iron Kong's pilot guilty. The Iron Kong fires at them but they disappear. Suddenly a giant zoid with 3 heads appears, Cerberus. It fires at the Iron Kong and defeats it. Its 3 creators laughed as the Iron Kong burns. Meanwhile, Thomas briefs Van and Fiona about the Trinity Ghost, a group responsible for the attack on zoid pilots. unknown to them they are being watched by the Trinity Ghost, and they declare Thomas guilty. When Thomas shows them a sample of the message, he receives one himself. He goes and meet them by himself, and gets beaten pretty badly. Thomas is hospitalized and Van and Fiona visit him, after hearing his account, they go to the site of the incident. Van finds a piece of glass. The trinity ghost watches them and declare Van guilty. Van and Fiona go to the Thomas' former university where new imperial weapons are developed to ask for help.
57	"The Nightmare (Nightmare)" (Japanese: 悪夢)	October 14, 2000	May 7, 2002
Van, Irvine and Thomas are making some adjustments to the Attack Booster. It seems they attack booster can be upgraded to make the Blade Liger go several times faster. Which would increases the chances of defeating the Geno-Breaker. In some cliffs, Hiltz and Ambient are about to release an ancient type of zoid. At the base, Fiona senses the heat signature of this crude zoid and rushes off. Then Hiltz reports to the Dark Kaizer as Hiltz is talking to the Dark Kaizer, Raven drops in on Hiltz and after a few seconds leaves to the top of the mountain and looks at the stars. He vows next time Van and him meet that one of us will die. Fiona has a bad dream and finds what she sought. At the base, Van went to try out the enhanced booster while, Moonbay, Thomas and Fiona flew off in the Pteras' and Dibison. Later on, Van and Irvine prep their zoids for battle as they hear Raven is approaching in the Geno-Breaker. Moonbay, Thomas and Fiona arrive at the cliffs to find Hiltz has unleashed an ancient scorpion-type zoid, the Death Stinger. Thomas's Dibison unleashes its strongest attack against the resurrected zoid and fails. Finally, while Van, Irvine, and Raven are fighting at a base, the Death Stinger fires a beam from the Charged Particle Gun aimed directly in their path. After the beam is fired the Geno Breaker is damaged and crashes. The story ends with Shadow overheating from being attached to its zoid core and hardening into a stone statue with Raven holding it in tears.
58	"Attack of the Winged Dragons (Pterosaur Interception)" (Japanese: 翼竜迎撃)	October 21, 2000	May 8, 2002
After being unsuccessful in stopping Hiltz, he takes to orbit in the Hammer Kaizer with the Death Stinger inside. Fiona piloting a Pteras and Moonbay piloting a silver Pteras, they were monitoring the Hammer Kaizer. Hiltz announces to everyone in the Republic about the Death Stinger and asks them the name of the town below there, Major Herman tells him if he does not know then he would not tell him. Hiltz destroys it with a blast of the Charged Particle Gun from the Death Stinger. Major Herman goes to the Capital and asks the Madam President, about taking two Storm Sworders into space. He wants the pilots on Storm Sworders to be Van Flyheight and Thomas Schubaltz. At the battlefield where both Van and Thomas are alongside Irvine, are attacked by a couple of Heldigunners. Van tells Irvine to take his place as the Storm Sworder pilot, and they should leave now. Meanwhile, surrounded by several cliffs, the severely damaged Geno Breaker rests along with Shadow in its left claw.
59	"The Capital Collapses (Collapse of the capital)" (Japanese: 首都崩壊)	October 28, 2000	May 9, 2002
After making a direct hit with the surface and surviving the Hammer Kaizer destruction, the Death Stinger made its way to New Helic City. At traveling forty km per day, it would make it to the Capital within two hours. The evacuations of the Republic were mostly complete, only the South and West sectors remain. Emperor Rudolph reassures the president, the defense forces of the Empire will be arriving to give assistance, among them will be Colonel Schubaltz's Armored Panzer Division. Colonel Herman gets an idea to sin the Death Stinger into molten magma, with some strategic bombing the crust will break and the Death Stinger will fall into the magma. Van is still battling it out with Blue Geno Saurer, Reice. While, Raven is still mourning the loss of his organoid, Shadow. As Irvine and Thomas were making it to the Storm Sworders for the bombing run, the Death Stinger changes course and starts heading for the molten lava himself.
60	"The Giant Fortress (Giant Fortress)" (Japanese: 超巨大要塞)	November 4, 2000	May 13, 2002
After retreating from the doomed Capital, the Republican and Imperial Forces have been going to Wendeen Lake. This is where the Republican's secret weapon, the Ultrasaurus was resting. A last-ditch strategy they will use to defeat the Death Stinger is under way. They are planning to awaken the Ultrasaurus, a heavy carrier zoid, which would provide them with cover and firepower to take on the Death Stinger. Colonel Herman believes there is only a 50% chance the Ultrasaurus will awaken. Van talks some sense into Colonel Herman and eventually makes him realize, he has to believe in the 50% chance the Ultrasaurus will awaken or it's hopeless. Six power blocks of the Ultrasaurus are ready for action and are functioning well to their maximum. Moonbay got an idea to kick start the seventh power block of the Ultrasaurus. Meanwhile, the Death Stinger slumbering in the molten lava within a mountain, it blows through the mountain with a Charged Particle Beam and sets out after the Ultrasaurus.
61	"The Great Sea Battle (Giant Dragon Naval Battle)" (Japanese: 巨竜大海戦)	November 11, 2000	May 14, 2002
After the Ultrasaurus had awoken and made it to sea and starts on the journey to the Empire, Van and Irvine start engaging the Helcats and start taking them one by one until the Death Stinger charged its Charged Particle Beam. Van and Irvine, knowing the power of the beam, turned around started to run. As the Charged Particle Beam made its way toward them, both the Blade Liger and Lighting Saix kicked into their boosters and started to run as fast as their zoid's capacity. the beam was going to hit them, but Rosso and Viola picked them up and delivered them to the Ultrasaurus just in the nick of time. Colonel Herman goes over the meeting about the Ultrasaurus and its defenses. Besides basic armaments and normal defensive tactics its completely vulnerable, so they are going to a top secret Imperial Plant to get the Gravity Cannon, once this is in place the Ultrasaurus will be a truly powerful and invincible force to be reckoned with. They had sent out a Hammer Head for surveillance.
62	"The Gravity Cannon (Gravity Cannon [Gravity Cannon])" (Japanese: 重力砲（グラビティカノン）)	November 18, 2000	May 15, 2002
The Ultrasaurus arrives in an area where there are a lot of islands and finds the one where the gravity cannon is ready to be installed onto it. Krueger is taken to Guygalos to recover and rest, and Rudolph arrives. Then everyone looks at the gravity cannon, and are surprised at how huge it is, but they have to equip it on the Ultrasaurus quickly or the enemy will find them. Meanwhile, Hiltz has arrived in the islands and sends many Sinkers to find the Ultrasaurus. At a meeting, Dr. D explains how the gravity cannon works. There are two parts to it, the actual gun and the power generators. The shell is made of a dense material that has its own gravitational field, and will make a ""black hole"" when it strikes its target. But there are only three shells, and one must be used for a test shot. Karl is appointed to aim and fire the gravity cannon. Van, Thomas, and Irvine check on their zoids. The gravity cannon is linked to the Ultrasaurus.
63	"The Final Battle (Great Decisive Battle!)" (Japanese: 大決戦!)	November 25, 2000	May 16, 2002
The gravity cannon is ready to go up against the Death Stinger, the only problem is that they must get the Death Stinger to hold still long enough for it to feel the full impact of the gravity cannon. The decision to use the delta formation is used. Once the Death Stinger is in sight Van, Irvine, and Thomas leave in their zoids leaving Van as the back point of the triangle. They complete the delta formation, but this time when they get into the formation it creates a pyramid shield barrier trapping the Death Stinger inside. The cannon shoots, but just before it gets close enough to the Death Stinger it breaks the shield barrier and fires its Charged Particle Beam, destroying the shell. The fighters conclude that if they take off their shields they can concentrate more energy on the barrier. The fight commences. Finally they reform the delta formation, this time concentrating all of the energy on the barrier.
64	"The Ancient Memory [Part One] (Ancient Memory)" (Japanese: 古代の記憶)	December 2, 2000	January 4, 2003
After the Death Stinger seemed finished, it was renewed. The Death Stinger is destroyed by the gravity cannon, but Ambient appears and fuses with the destroyed Death Stinger, reviving it. Van and Irvine try to attack, but the DS buried itself into the ground, and went attacking the Ultrasaurus, which injured Dr. D. Also, Raven ran to Shadow, thinking Shadow would be pleased to see him again, but Shadow attacked Raven. The Dark Kaiser came up, and tells Raven that Shadow is now his slave. This angers Raven, and he charges after the Dark Kaiser, but is flipped. Later, Fiona is thunderstruck when she heard ""Zoid Eve"", and was hit by a stray bullet from the Death Stinger. As usual, Van exited his zoid, and ran to Fiona.
65	"The Zoid Eve [Part Two] (Zoid Eve)" (Japanese: ゾイドイヴ)	December 9, 2000	January 4, 2003
66	"The Moment of Annihilation [Part Three] (Hour of Destruction)" (Japanese: 滅びの刻)	December 16, 2000	January 4, 2003
The final battle between Van and Hiltz has arrived, but Fiona keeps seeing Prozen. Reice, flying on Specular, appears in front of Prozen (Raven, Reice, and their organoids were awakened when Fiona opened the gate to Zoids Eve). It's obvious that Reice is no longer taking orders from the Dark Kaizer. Just when the evil man is about to give her one of his energy blasts, Raven appears in the Geno Breaker. They exchange angry words, and Prozen sends three Geno Saurers to attack. Reice watches tearfully while Raven battles with them. Suddenly, stray gunfire hits the building holding Zoid Eve causing it to activate. The Death Stinger begins to glow. Meanwhile, Lt. O'Connell is flying overhead sending aerial photos to the Ultrasaurus. Captain Herman notices that the Death Stinger is resurrected. Also in the skies is Prince Rudolph and a group of Whale Kings. Rudolph sees a picture of the Dark Kaizer and immediately recognizes him as Prozen. On the ground, Van watches helplessly as the Death Stinger.
67	"Return to Another Tomorrow (Return to Tomorrow)" (Japanese: 明日への帰還)	December 23, 2000	January 4, 2003
In the Final Episode, Van and Raven give it all they got to defeat the resurrected Death Saurer. Hiltz is on a rampage blasting away with the Saurer's Charged Particle Beam. To destroy the Death Saurer, Fiona and Zeke are prepared to sacrifice themselves to destroy Zoid Eve, but in doing so, all of the Zoids on Zi would be destroyed. Van stops them and plans to destroy the Death Saurer by launching himself from the Gravity Cannon on the Ultrasaurus. The Death Saurer's energy shield is destroyed by Raven with the Geno Breaker's charged particle beam. The Liger is shot out of the cannon and thrust through a charged particle blast right through the Zoid Core of the Death Saurer, destroying it and Hiltz. The Zoid Eve retreats underground, and the Death Saurer explodes.
