= Cardno Point =

Cardno Point (54°0′S 38°0′W) is a high flat-topped, tussock-covered headland forming the eastern extremity of Bird Island, off the west end of South Georgia. It was named by the UK Antarctic Place-Names Committee for Lieutenant Commander Peter G.N. Cardno, Royal Navy, navigating officer of HMS Owen, which made a hydrographic survey of the area in 1960–61.
