= Fantôme Brewery =

Small brewery in Belgium

Coordinates: 50°17′08″N 5°30′40″E

Brasserie Fantôme
- Industry: Alcoholic beverage
- Founded: 1988
- Founder: Dany Prignon
- Headquarters: Soy, Érezée, Belgium
- Products: Beer
- Production output: approximately 240 hL
- Owner: Dany Prignon
- Website: www.fantome.be

Fantôme (Brasserie Fantôme) is a small brewery in Soy, Wallonia, Belgium. Founded in 1988 by Dany Prignon, it produces saisons, a type of farmhouse ale.

== General ==
The brewery occupies a stone farmhouse on the main road through the village of Soy in the Marche-en-Famenne district of Luxembourg province.

Founded in 1988, Brasserie Fantôme has gained international attention and a cult following among lovers of craft beers. Owned and run by Dany Prignon, Fantôme is known for its unique variations on the saison style of farmhouse ale, often involving the use of herbs, spices or fruit juice. Ironically, while their complex, earthy, and herbal flavors have caused them to be sought out by connoisseurs outside Belgium, Fantôme's products are difficult to find and not well known in the country of their origin.

The name of the brewery stems from a legend of the nearby town of La Roche-en-Ardenne, which asserts that the ghost of the long-dead Countess Berthe de La Roche can still be seen walking amidst the ruins of the town's castle.

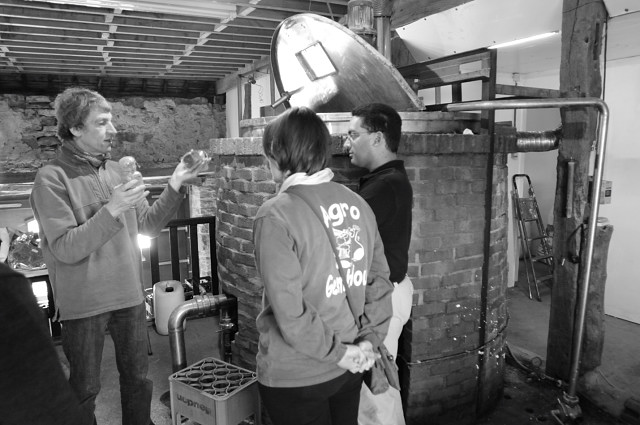
Guided tour with the brewmaster, April 2010. The brick-insulated mash tun can be seen in the background

== Production ==
The brewery's equipment, much of which was obtained from the original brewhouse of the Brasserie d'Achouffe, is capable of producing 750 liter batch at a time, which is matured in cylindro-conical fermenters and aged for several weeks before being hand bottled and labeled on the premises. Beer is made about once per week, with many of the specialties being produced only once per year. Fantôme's products are available only in corked and capped 750ml bottles of green glass and on tap.

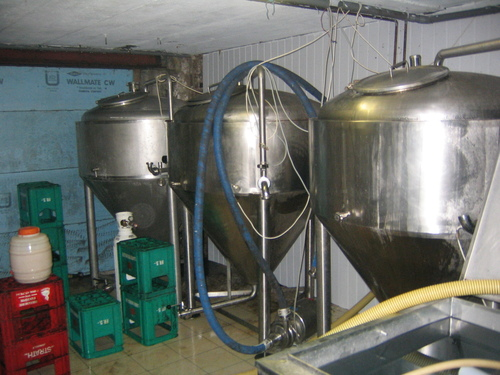
The brewery's cylindro-conical fermentation tanks.

== Beers ==
- Fantôme Saison (8.0% ABV), their flagship product, a fruity, strong take on the Saison style. Described as "Intense — maybe too intense — flavors of orange, peach and strawberry; a lot going on."
- Saison d' Erezee (varies from 6.0% - 9.0% ABV) A quarterly product named for the season (Printemps - Été - Automne - Hiver) that varies in its formulation each year
- Fantôme Chocolat (8.0% ABV), made with chocolate
- Fantôme Speciale Noel (10.0% ABV), a Christmas beer with a spicy character
- Fantôme Brise-BonBons! (8.0% ABV), a particularly hoppy beer
- Fantôme Pissenlit (8.0% ABV) made with dandelions, literally "wet the bed" in French. Described as "highly spicy with touches of pepper and slight grass and floral notes, a touch of lemon-lime citrus."
- Fantôme Black Ghost (8.0% ABV) A dark beer whose formulation has changed over time.
- Fantôme Strange Ghost (8.0% ABV)
- Fantôme La Dalmatienne (8.0% ABV) An amber-colored winter offering.
- Fantôme BBB Babillard (8.0% ABV) Produced based on the results of a members' poll from a popular online beer enthusiast forum.

In addition to those listed above, there are many special and one-time products made at the whim of the brewmaster. Custom beers have been made on commission for bars, such as the Circus Fantôme created for the now-closed Beer Circus in Croydon, UK, or on behalf of charity, like the Fantôme Santé.
