= Slate Islands (Ontario) =

Islands in Lake Superior

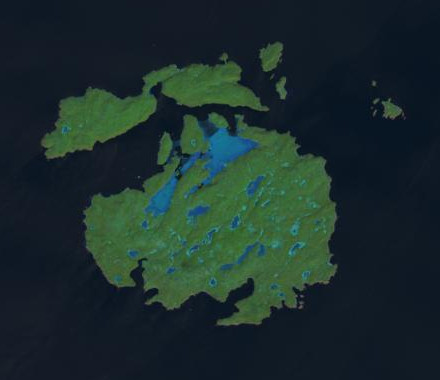

- Location within Ontario

Geography
- Coordinates: 48°39′N 87°00′W
- Adjacent to: Lake Superior
- Total islands: 15
- Major islands: Patterson, Mortimer
- Area: 36 km^{2} (14 sq mi)

Administration
- Canada
- Province: Ontario
- District: Thunder Bay
- Municipality: Terrace Bay

The Slate Islands are a small archipelago in Lake Superior, Ontario, Canada, about 12 kilometres (7.5 mi) south of the town of Terrace Bay. The island group, consisting of 15 islands in total, was created by a meteorite impact which formed a crater about 32 km (20 mi) wide. In 1985, the Ontario government established the Slate Islands as a natural environment provincial park. The islands are notable for having Ontario's largest herd of boreal woodland caribou.

== Geography ==
The island group consists of two main islands (Patterson and Mortimer), five minor islands (McColl, Edmonds, Bowes, Delaute and Dupuis islands) and numerous islets.

The total surface area is about 36 square kilometres (14 sq mi).

The nearby Leadman Group of islands, about one kilometre (0.6 mi) east, is often considered part of the Slate Islands. This group includes Leadman, Cape, Spar and Fish Islands.

== Human history ==
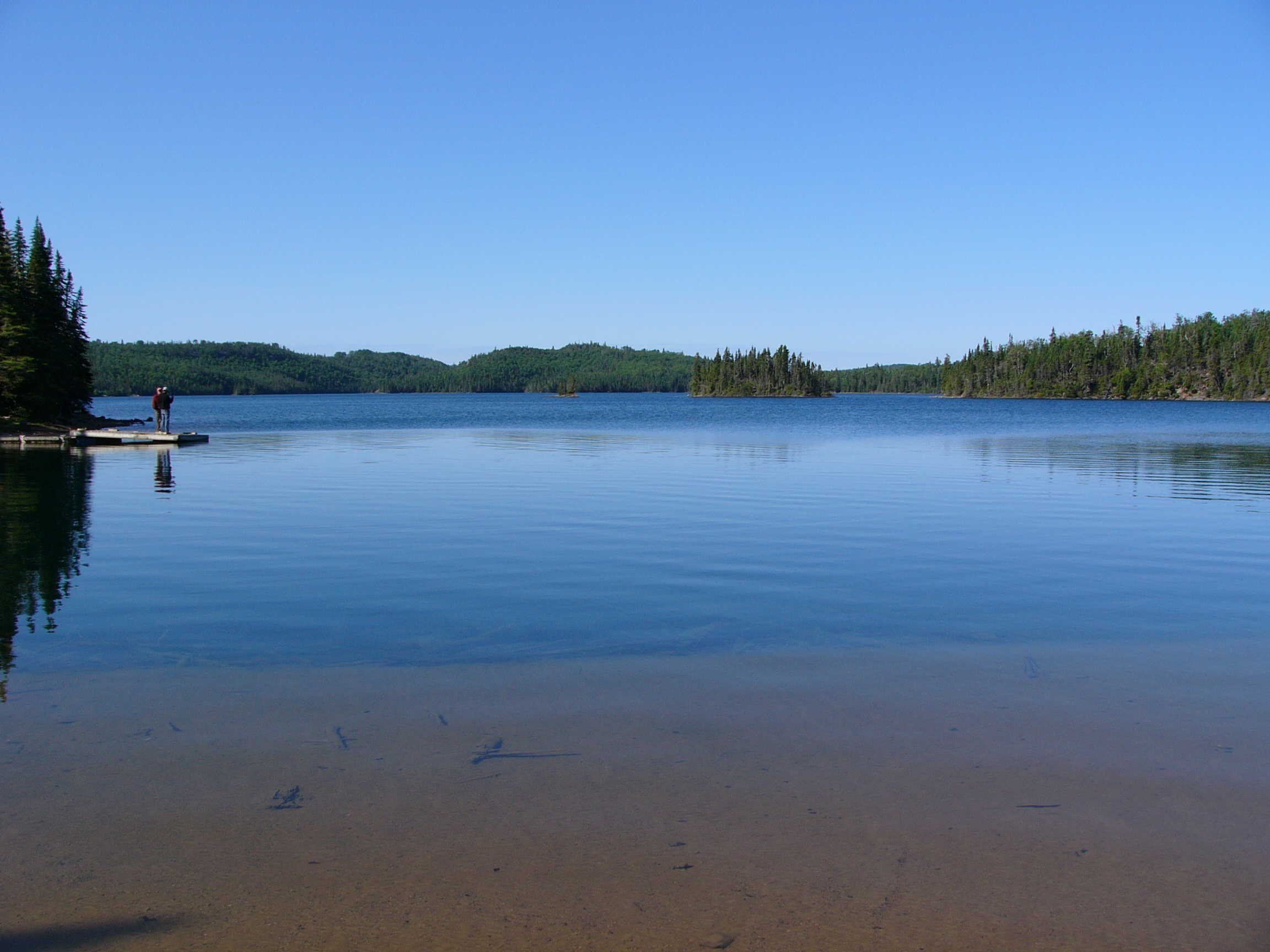
McGreevy Harbour, Slate Islands, was once used as a staging area for logs during the logging boom of the 1930s

Human sites have been found on the islands dating to about 1000 CE.

A lighthouse was built on Patterson Island, the largest island, in 1903 to help ships locate the harbour at the nearby town of Jackfish, Ontario. The island is named after William Patterson, a former lieutenant-governor of Saskatchewan. Later, a fishing station was built on McColl Island.

The original forests on the islands were modified by logging and forest fires. Up until the 1940s, the islands were used to stockpile boomed logs from the mainland Lake Superior north shore for export on lake freighters to pulp mills in the United States.

In 1985, the Slate Islands were protected as an Ontario Natural Environment Provincial Park. The islands remoteness is enforced by almost 9 kilometres (5.6 mi) of open, wild, Lake Superior water and its distance from any large communities. It is frequented by naturalists, fishing parties, sailors exploring this Great Lake, and recently by an increasing number of sea kayaking parties.

== Fauna ==
The islands are home to boreal woodland caribou which migrated by ice bridge from the mainland most recently in 1907. They have been studied extensively from 1974 to 2007 by A.T. (Tom) Bergerud. The caribou are a classic example of island biogeography in action; the islands are notable for species that are absent but present on the adjacent mainland (red squirrel, moose, white-tailed deer, and grouse). No ungulates were present on the islands until the caribou arrived in the early 1900s while predators have been present only sporadically. Caribou reached the highest population density in the world on the islands before the 1990s, with the herd estimated at 650 animals. After a food shortage and die-off in 1990, the numbers were reduced to about 100. In 2012 there were about 200 caribou on the Slate Islands. Great Lakes-boreal wolves reached the archipelago in the early 1990s, preying heavily on the caribou, but for reasons not entirely understood, they disappeared a few years later. Wolves are again present on the island since winter 2015/16 (or earlier) as evidenced by aerial observation and scat.

The waters surrounding the Slate Islands have been protected from commercial fishing to preserve one of the last native stocks of lake trout in Lake Superior. The Islands have been a source of lake trout brood stock used at the Dorion Fish Hatchery, and fingerlings are planted back to Lake Superior to restore the fishery.

=== Species ===
Mammals found on the islands include boreal woodland caribou, Great Lakes wolf, North American beaver, muskrat, snowshoe hare, red fox, meadow jumping mouse, and little brown bat.

Bird species include American bittern, bald eagle, Canada goose, common loon, great blue heron, grey jay, herring gull, red-breasted merganser, and peregrine falcon.

Amphibians present include blue-spotted salamander, boreal chorus frog, Cope's gray treefrog, western American toad, northern spring peeper, and wood frog.

== Flora ==
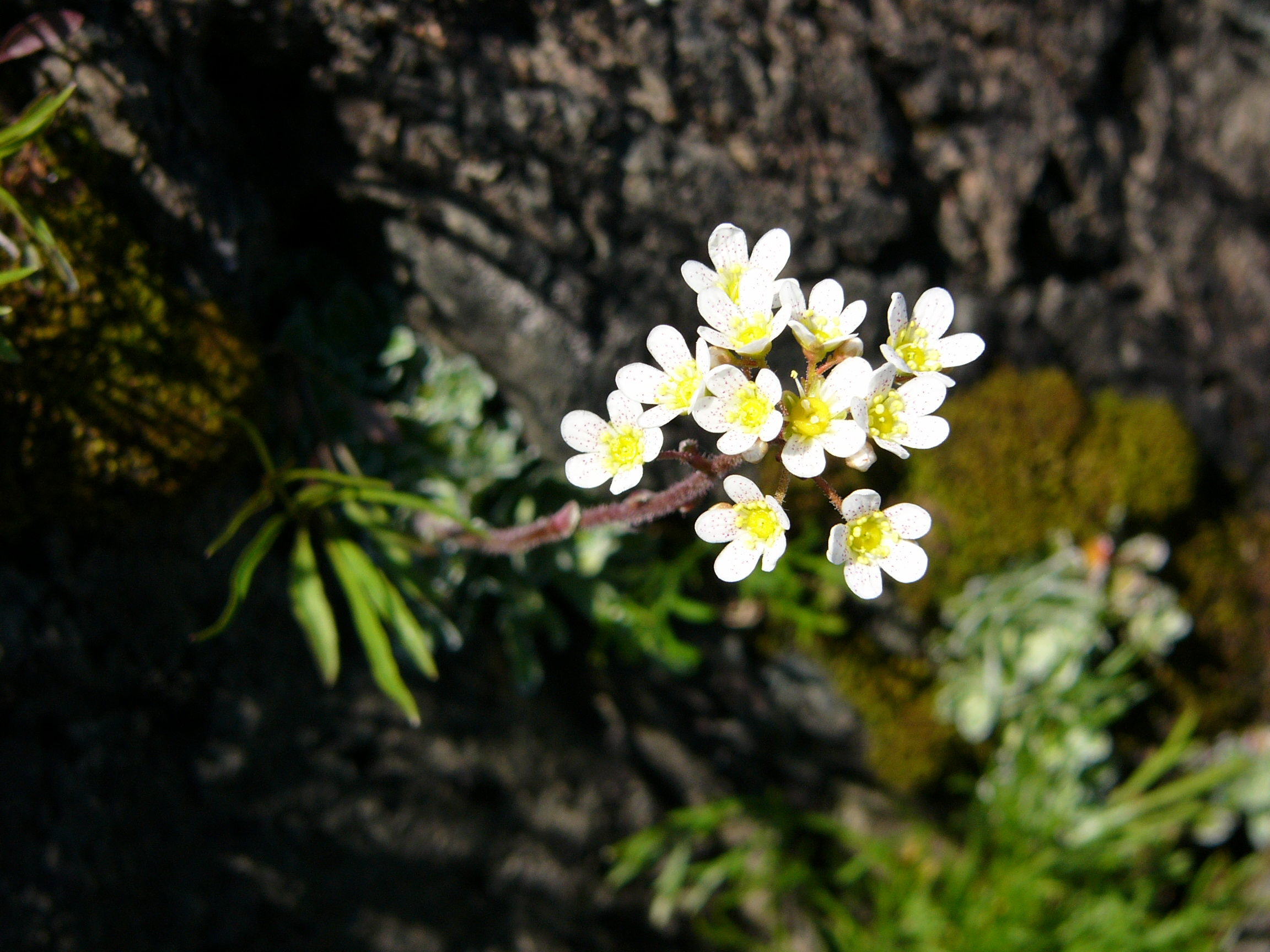
Saxifraga paniculata, growing at Williams Point in the Slate Islands

The cooling effect of Lake Superior makes the Slate Islands a particularly harsh habitat for its latitude. As a result, islands harbour arctic and alpine plant species such as alpine chickweed (at its most southerly occurrence), Dryas drummondii (not found again for 1600 km (1000 mi) north), and alpine bistort, an Inuit delicacy eaten with seal oil. These arctic disjuncts are reminders of ice ages and associated tundra conditions in this area in the past.

Vascular plants found on the islands are:

- balsam fir (Abies balsamea)
- black spruce (Picea mariana)
- eastern white cedar (Thuja occidentalis)
- northern mountain ash (Sorbus decora)
- quaking aspen (Populus tremuloides)
- white birch (Betula papyrifera)
- alpine bistort (Bistorta vivipara)
- alpine chickweed (Cerastium alpinum)
- alpine cliff fern (Woodsia alpina)
- alpine sedge (Carex glacialis)
- American dune grass (Leymus mollis)
- American mountain-ash (Sorbus americana)
- Appalachian fir-clubmoss (Huperzia appalachiana)
- beach pea (Lathyrus japonicus)
- bird's-eye primrose (Primula mistassinica)
- black crowberry (Empetrum nigrum)
- butterwort (Pinguicula spp.)
  - common butterwort (Pinguicula vulgaris)
- Canadian yew (Taxus canadensis)
- creeping snowberry (Gaultheria hispidula)
- cut-leaved anemone (Anemone multifida)
- devil's club (Oplopanax horridus)
- dwarf rattlesnake plantain (Goodyera repens)
- entire-leaved mountain-avens (Dryas integrifolia)
- goldie's round-leaved orchid (Platanthera macrophylla)
- goldthread (Coptis trifolia)
- heartleaf twayblade (Listera cordata)
- horned dandelion (Taraxacum ceratophorum)
- knotted pearlwort (Sagina nodosa)
- Labrador tea (Rhododendron groenlandicum)
- lady fern (Athryium felix-femina)
- large-leaved sandwort (Moehringia macrophylla)
- leafy lichen (Peltigera spp.)
- low spike-moss (Selaginella selaginoides)
- moonwort grape-fern (Botrychium lunnaria)
- mountain avens/yellow dryas (Dryas drummondii)
- mountain bladder fern (Cystopteris montana)
- mountain cranberry (Vaccinium vitis-idaea)
- mountain clubmoss (Huperzia selago)
- mountain fir-moss (Huperzia appalachiana)
- northern meadow sedge (Carex praticola)
- northern white anemone (Anemone parviflora)
- old man's beard (Usnea spp.)
- prairie spikemoss (Selaginella densa)
- prickly rose (Rosa acicularis)
- rand's goldenrod (Solidago simplex ssp. randii)
- red stemmed feather moss (Pleurozium schreberi)
- reindeer lichen (Cladonia rangiferina)
- rock tripe (Umbilicaria spp.)
- rose twisted stalk (Roseus streptosus)
- roundleaf shadbush (Amelanchier sanguinea)
- scirpus sedge (Carex scirpus)
- smooth woodsia (Woodsia glabella)
- sphagnum moss (Sphagnum spp.)
- spike trisetum (Trisetum spicatum)
- stair-step moss (Hylocomium splendens)
- viviparous knotweed (Polygonum viviparum)
- white mountain-saxifrage (Saxifraga paniculata)
- wild chives (Allium schoenoprasum var. sibiricum)
- wild sarsaparilla (Aralia nudicaulis)

== Geology ==
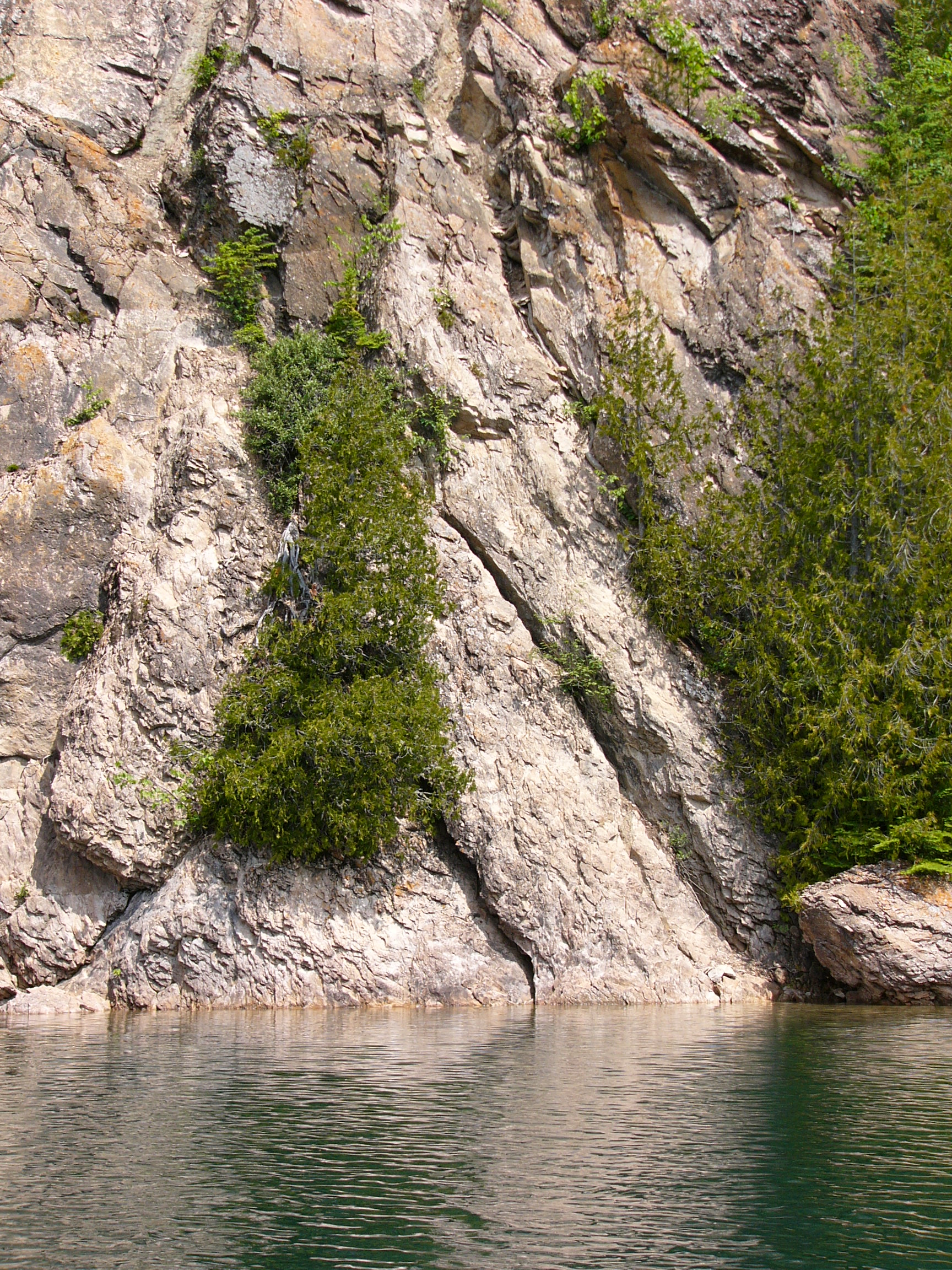
Approximately 9 m (30 ft) tall shatter cone located in McGreevy Harbour, Slate Islands

Contrary to their name, the islands are not made of slate; the rock is mainly of metamorphosed volcanic rocks greater than 2.7 billion years old. Also present are sedimentary rocks of the Rove and Gunflint formations, approximately 1.85-2.10 billion years old. There is evidence that about 1.1 billion years ago, there was volcanic centre on Paterson Island, however almost all volcanic rocks have been removed by erosion.

The youngest rocks are diatremes, referring to breccia-filled volcanic pipes that were formed by gaseous explosions. They occur as dikes or sills which criss-cross the all older rocks types.

Also located in the islands are good examples of shatter cones, rare geological features formed in bedrock by the high velocity shock waves created by meteorite impacts. They have a distinctively conical shape with thin grooves (striae) that radiate from the top (apex) of the cone. The Slate Islands are home to a shatter cone measuring 9 m (30 ft), one of the largest examples in the world (pictured here).

Allogenic breccia is present, notably on the east and north sides of the islands.

== Impact crater ==
The Slate Islands mark the centre of a large meteorite complex impact crater. The original crater rim is estimated at 32 km (20 mi) in diameter, but this and most of the crater has subsequently eroded away, leaving the islands which are interpreted as a central uplift. The age of the impact event is estimated to be about 450 million years (Ordovician). Another source estimates the age at 800-500 million years (late Proterozoic to early Paleozoic). It may be one of several Middle Ordovician meteors that fell roughly simultaneously 469 million years ago, part of a proposed Ordovician meteor event, including the Decorah crater in Iowa, the Ames crater in Oklahoma, and the Rock Elm crater in Wisconsin.

== Provincial park ==
Slate Islands Provincial Park
- IUCN category II (national park)
- Interactive map of Slate Islands Provincial Park
- Location: Lake Superior
- Nearest city: Terrace Bay
- Coordinates: 48°39′32″N 87°00′12″W
- Area: 6,570 ha (25.4 sq mi)
- Designation: Natural environment
- Established: 1985
- Governing body: Ontario Parks
- Website: www.ontarioparks.com/park/slateislands

The Slate Islands Provincial Park was established in 1985 to protect the biodiversity and provincially significant elements of the natural and cultural landscape, and to maintain the islands' ecology by controlling development and focusing recreational use.

While it is a non-operating park, some facilities are available, such as a dock, warm-up shelter, and five backcountry campsites. Permitted activities include boating, camping, canoeing, fishing, and hiking. It is only accessible via boat or floatplane.

== Bibliography ==
- Chisholm, B.; Gutsche, A (1998), Superior: Under the Shadow of the Gods, Toronto: Lynx Images, ISBN 0-9698427-7-5
- Pye, E.G. (1997). Roadside Geology of Ontario: North Shore of Lake Superior, Ontario GEOservices Centre, ROCK ON Series 2. ISBN 0-7778-5850-9
- Sharpton, V.L. and Dressler, B.O. 'The Slate Islands Impact Structure: Structural Interpretation and Age Constraints', Lunar and Planetary Science. March 1996: vol. 27
- Godwin, L. (February 1996) "Woodland Caribou in Northwestern Ontario - Why they are different...", Northwestern Ontario Boreal Forest Management Technical Note TN-07
