= Rock Elm (disambiguation) =

The rock elm (Ulmus thomasii) is a deciduous tree native primarily to the Midwestern United States.

Rock Elm may also refer to:

- Rock Elm, Nova Scotia, Canada
- Rock Elm, Michigan, United States
- Rock Elm, Wisconsin, United States
  - Rock Elm (community), Wisconsin
  - Rock Elm Disturbance, an impact crater
