= Ames crater =

Meteorite crater in Major County, Oklahoma, United States

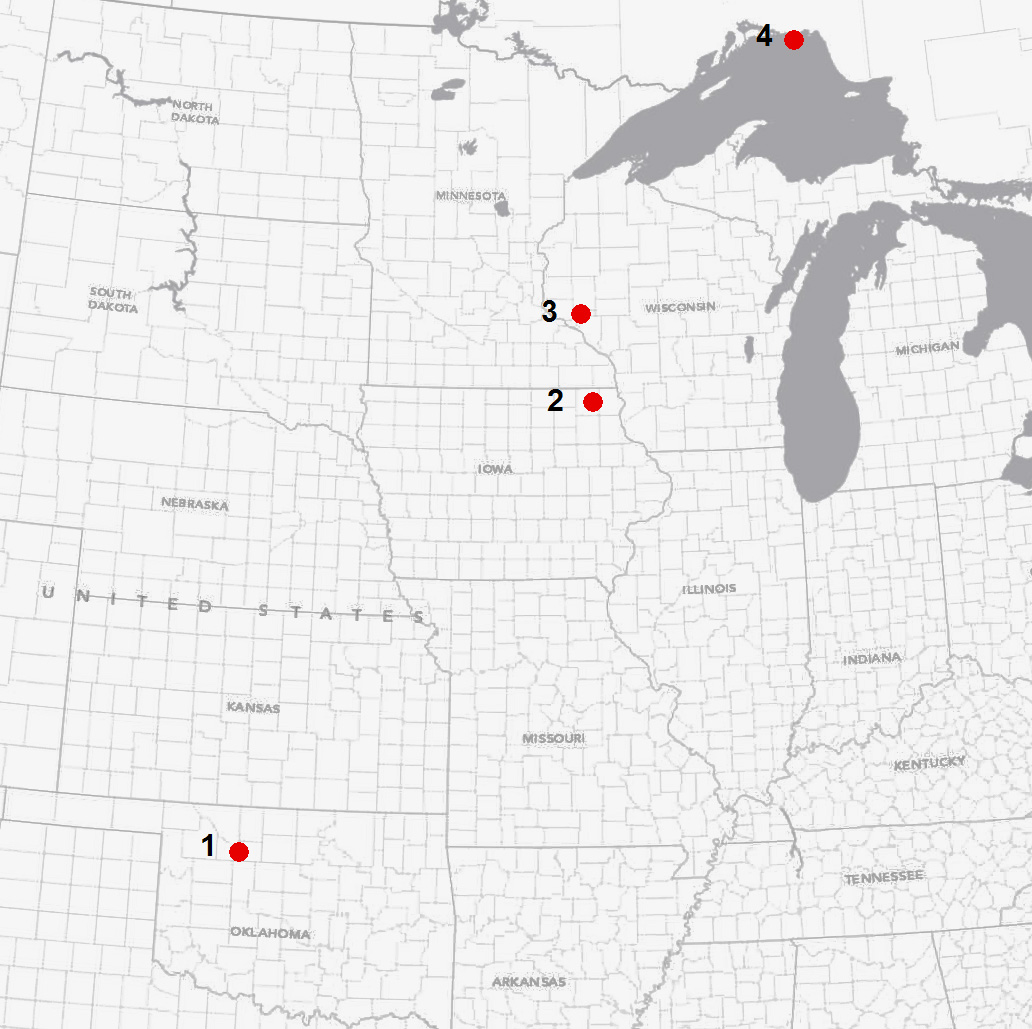
- North American Middle Ordovician impact craters, which may be part of the Ordovician meteor event. Key: 1: Ames crater, 2: Decorah crater, 3: Rock Elm Disturbance, 4: Slate Islands crater

- Location within the United States
- Location: Major County, Oklahoma, United States; 36°17′04″N 98°11′38″W

Impact crater structure
- Confidence: Confirmed
- Diameter: 10 mi (16 km)
- Age: 470 ± 30 Ma; Middle Ordovician
- Exposed: No
- Drilled: Yes
- Bolide type: Ordovician meteor event?

Ames crater is a meteorite crater (astrobleme) in Major County, Oklahoma, United States. Ames, Oklahoma is near the center of the structure, which is 30 miles (48 km) southwest of Enid, Oklahoma. Buried under a thick layer of sediment, it was not discovered until 1991. Subsequent drilling within the crater found a large amount of oil and gas. It is one of the largest of six meteor craters associated with oil-producing formations in the United States.

== Crater description ==
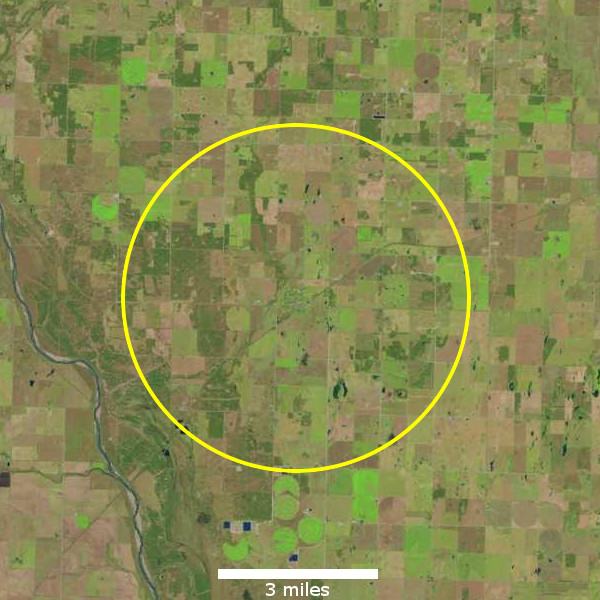
Approximate extent of Ames crater

Ames Crater is 10 miles (16 km) in diameter and the age is estimated to be 470 ± 30 million years (Ordovician). The crater is not exposed at the surface. It may be one of several Middle Ordovician meteors that fell roughly simultaneously 469 million years ago, part of a proposed Ordovician meteor event, including the Decorah crater in Iowa, the Slate Islands crater in Lake Superior, and the Rock Elm crater in Wisconsin.

The crater's origin has been postulated as meteorite impact, volcanic activity, dissolution collapse and other causes. Geomorphology, rock textures, mineralogies and stratigraphic arguments have been used to support impact origin.

== Discovery ==
When the meteor struck, this part of the Earth was covered by a shallow sea. The object, traveling at an estimated speed of 70,000 mph (110,000 km/h), created a crater in the Earth's crust. This created enormous pressures below the point of impact, which made the remnant of the meteorite recoil slightly, creating an uplift. The sea returned and over eons, deposited layers of sediment. Other geological movements tilted the formation slightly. The sea eventually disappeared, leaving the crater buried in the earth, invisible from the surface. It was discovered by Rex Olson in 1991 as he was studying a map generated using data from seismic tests. Olson, an exploration manager for Continental Resources, saw a seismic pattern that resembled a hoof print, or "a cow track in the mud". Showing the map to Harold Hamm, owner and chief executive officer (CEO) of the company, he pointed out what appeared to be an anomaly or "glitch" in the data. The two agreed that the anomaly resembled an astrobleme, a term meaning "star wound."

An unknown number of concealed impact sites have been discovered. Some have produced uranium, gold or diamonds. Prior to 1991, geologists were skeptical that worthwhile quantities of oil and gas could be found at such a site.

== Oil and gas production ==
The Ames Crater is covered by about 9,000 feet (2,700 m) of sediment, so it is not visible from the surface. It was discovered only in 1991. Prior to its discovery, many geologists believed that impact craters were unlikely to contain petroleum. Wells had been drilled near the crater site since the 1960s, but none had been drilled within the crater. However, Continental Resources drilled deep into the crater. The well struck oil at a 10,000 feet (3,000 m) depth that initially produced about 200 barrels per day (32 m^{3}/d).

The crater penetrated the Arbuckle Dolomite which resulted in vast amounts of oil and gas becoming accessible in the fractured rock. There were even rumors that the impact might have created diamonds. But no evidence of that was found. Iridium was also not found although it is used to identify astroblemes elsewhere.

At least 60 wells have been drilled in Ames Crater since 1991. About 30 of the original wells were still producing in 2007. According to an article published by the American Oil & Gas Historical Society (AOGHS), Ames had produced over 17.4 million barrels (2,770,000 m^{3}) of oil and 79.5 billion cubic feet (2.25×10^{9} m^{3}) of natural gas, making it the largest of the six producing astroblemes in the United States. (Note: Presumably the production data are valid for 2007)
