= Decorah crater =

470 million year old meteor crater in Iowa

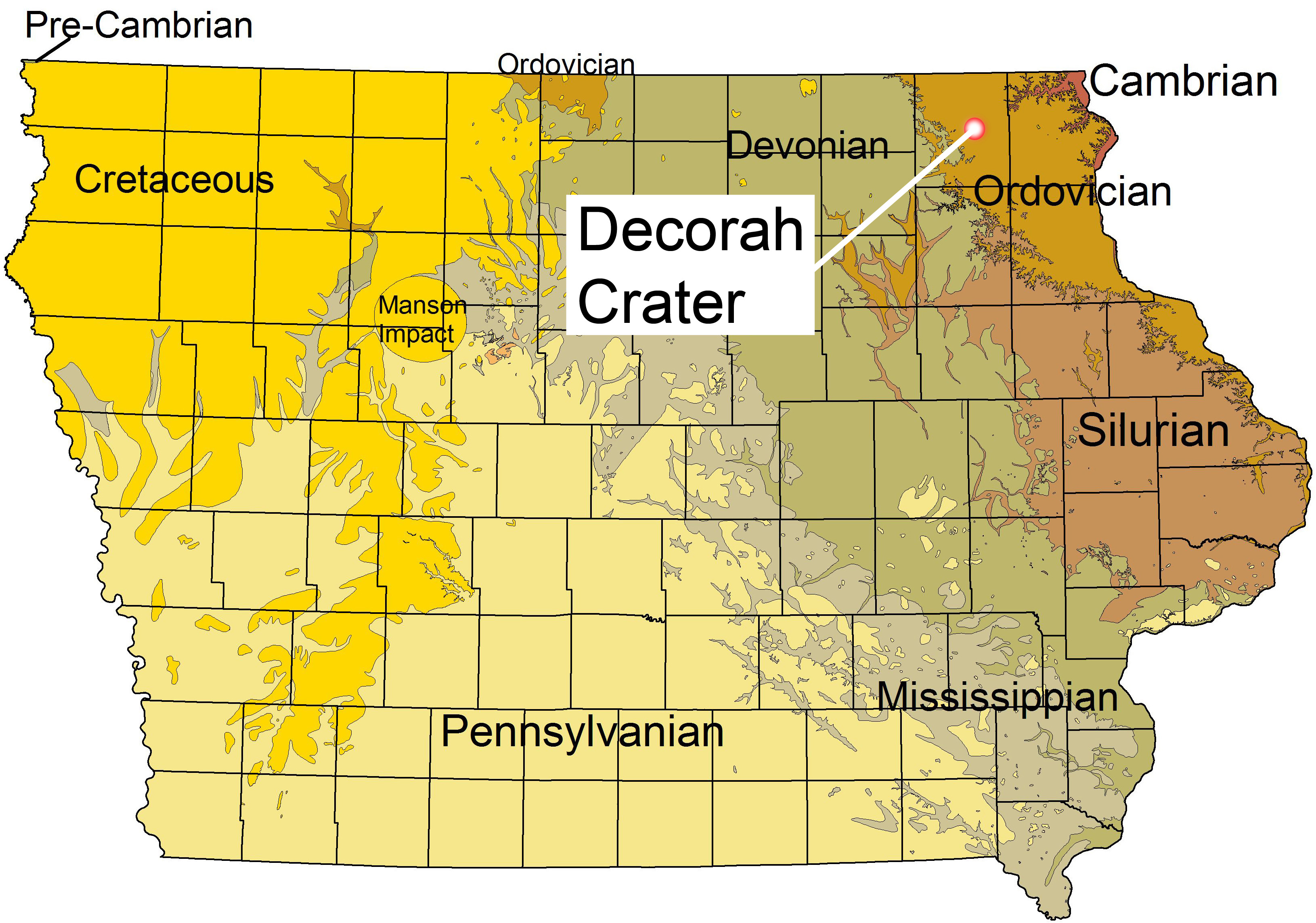
- Location of Decorah crater on bedrock map of Iowa

- Location within the United States
- Location: Decorah, Winneshiek, Iowa, United States; 43°18′50″N 91°46′20″W

Impact crater structure
- Confidence: Potential
- Diameter: 3.5 mi (5.6 km)
- Age: ~470 Ma; Middle Ordovician
- Exposed: No
- Drilled: No
- Bolide type: Ordovician meteor event?

The Decorah crater, also called the Decorah impact structure, is a possible impact crater located on the east side of the city of Decorah in Iowa, United States. It is thought to have been caused by a meteor about 200 metres (660 ft) wide which struck during the Middle Ordovician Period, circa 470 million years ago.

== Description ==
The crater is estimated to be 3.5 miles (5.6 km) in diameter, covered by the Winneshiek Shale. There is no surface evidence of the impact, as the Winneshiek Shale is more than 50 feet (15 m) below the bottom of the Upper Iowa River. The impact event, equivalent to 1,000 megatons of TNT, did not appear to penetrate the Earth's mantle, but it did push down the underlying Ordovician and Cambrian bedrock several hundred feet. It may be one of several Middle Ordovician meteors that fell roughly simultaneously 469 million years ago, part of a proposed Ordovician meteor event, including three other confirmed impact craters: Rock Elm crater in Wisconsin, Slate Islands crater in Lake Superior, and Ames crater in Oklahoma.

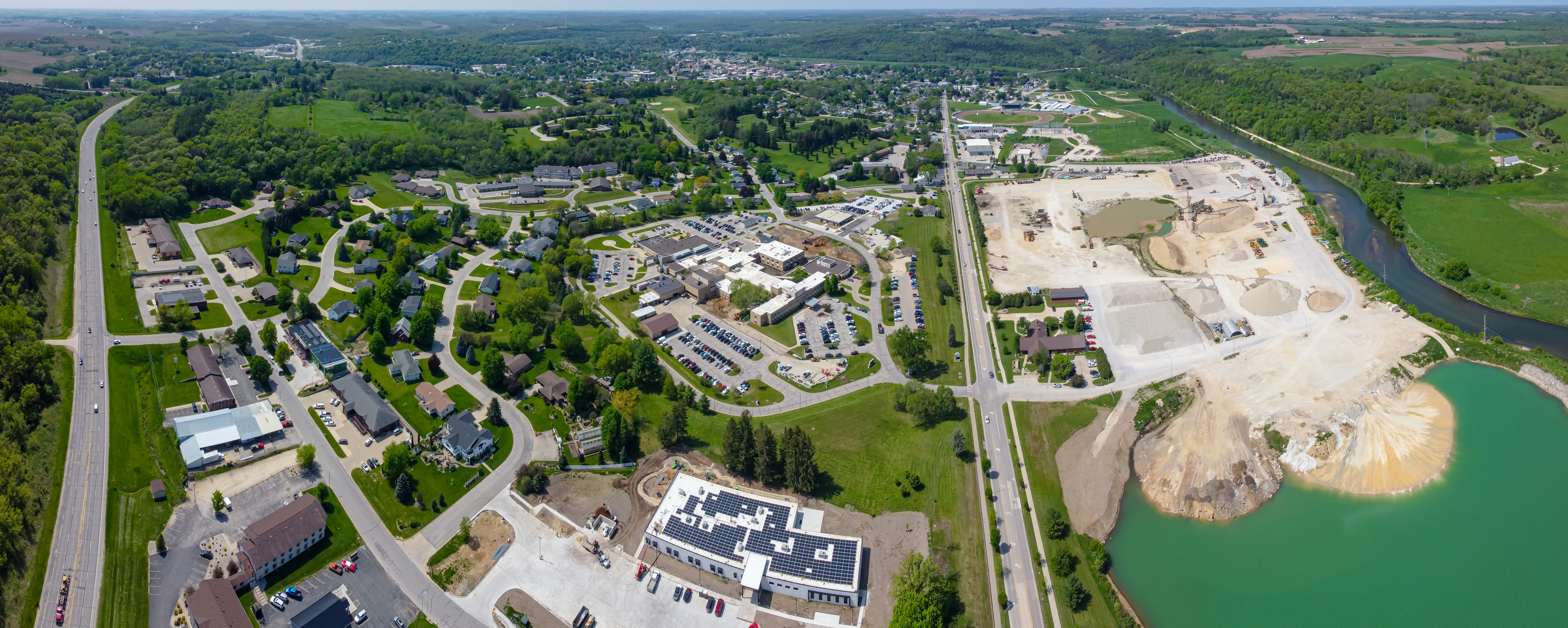

== Pentecopterus decorahensis ==
The Middle Ordovician (Darriwilian) Winneshiek Lagerstätte sediments that filled in the crater contained a wide variety of unusual fauna. Among them was a newly discovered species of eurypterid, Pentecopterus decorahensis. Pentecopterus was scorpion-like in appearance, and the largest predator known from that time, measuring nearly 6 feet in length. Its species name was derived from "Decorah."

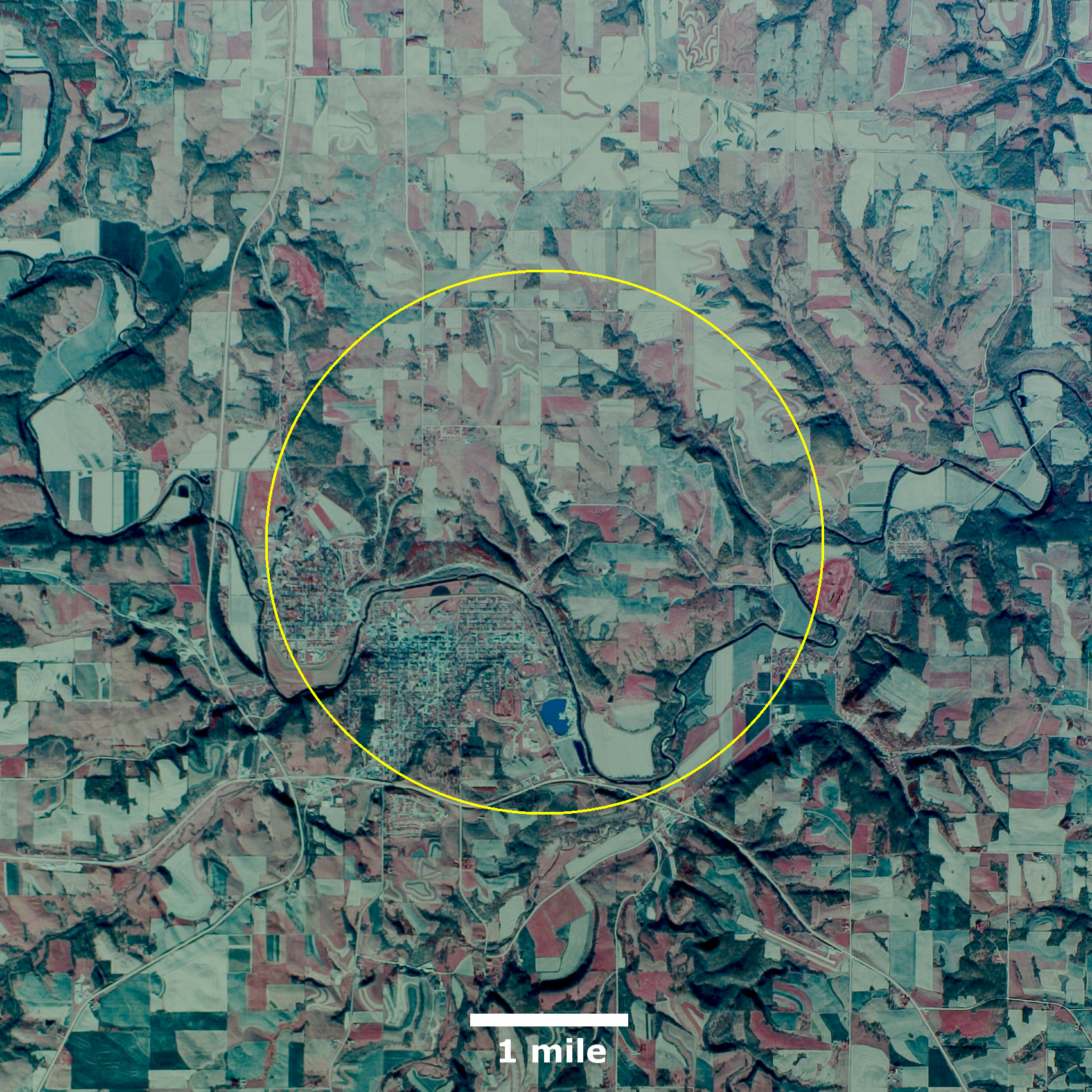
Aerial photo of Decorah and the extent of the crater

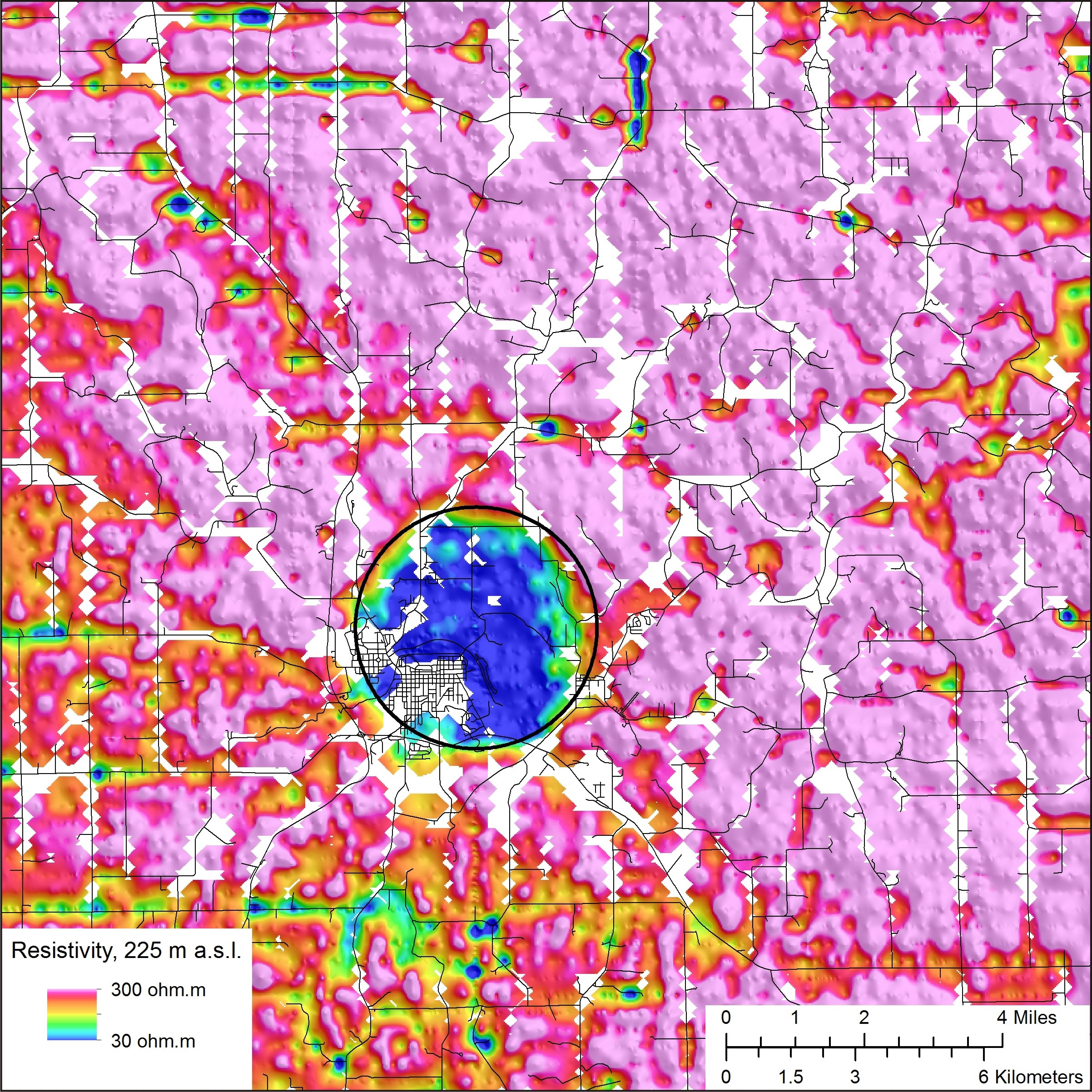
U.S. Geological Survey aerial resistivity map of the Decorah, Iowa area, showing the Decorah Impact Structure.

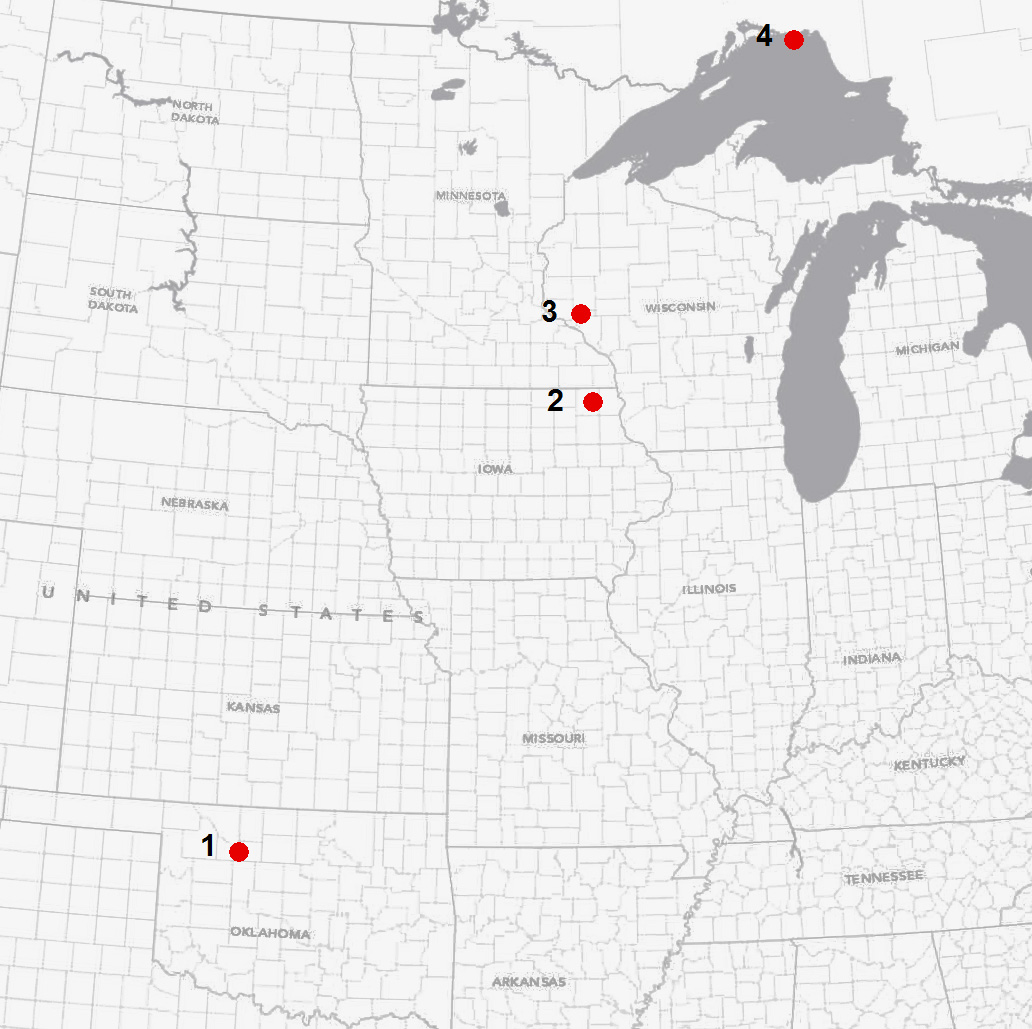
North American Middle Ordovician impact craters, which may be part of the Ordovician meteor event. Key: 1: Ames crater, 2: Decorah crater, 3: Rock Elm Disturbance, 4: Slate Islands crater.

== See also ==
- List of possible impact structures on Earth
