= Ames, Oklahoma =

- Town
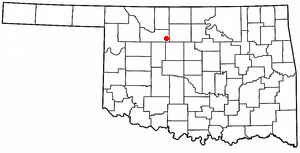
- Location in Oklahoma
- Coordinates: 36°14′49″N 98°11′10″W
- Country: United States
- State: Oklahoma
- County: Major

Area
  - Total: 0.28 sq mi (0.72 km^{2})
  - Land: 0.28 sq mi (0.72 km^{2})
  - Water: 0 sq mi (0.00 km^{2})
- Elevation: 1,211 ft (369 m)

Population (2020)
  - Total: 193
  - Density: 693.4/sq mi (267.72/km^{2})
- Time zone: UTC-6 (Central (CST))
  - Summer (DST): UTC-5 (CDT)
- ZIP code: 73718
- Area code: 580
- FIPS code: 40-01950
- GNIS feature ID: 2412361

Ames is a town in southeastern Major County, Oklahoma, United States. The population was 193 at the 2020 census, down from 239 in 2010.

Ames is best known for being located within the boundary of a geological structure that is called the Ames crater or the Ames Astrobleme. The Ames Astrobleme Museum is located in the town.

== History ==
Ames was founded at the opening of the Cherokee Outlet on September 16, 1893. It was initially named "Hoyle", for a nearby creek. The Blackwell, Enid and Southwestern Railroad (later the St. Louis and San Francisco Railway) constructed a line from Blackwell in Kay County to Darrow in Blaine County, that passed through the community. On January 4, 1902, it was named for Henry S. Ames, a railroad official.

Ames had a population of 278 at the 1920 census and 332 at the 1940 census, its peak population.

Oil was discovered within the Ames crater in 1991.

== Geography ==
Ames is located in southeastern Major County, about 82 miles (132 km) northwest of Oklahoma City, 27 miles (43 km) southwest of Enid, and 20 miles (32 km) east of Fairview, the Major county seat (roadv distances).

According to the U.S. Census Bureau, the town of Ames has a total area of 0.29 square miles (0.75 km^{2}), all land. Hoyle Creek, a southwest-flowing tributary of the Cimarron River, passes just west of the town limits.

== Ames Astrobleme Museum ==
The Ames Astrobleme Museum, which opened August 18, 2007, features numerous image panels and a video showing the formation of the Ames crater and its discovery as a significant geological and economic resource. The crater was caused by a meteor striking the area 450 million years ago. There is sediment 2 miles (3 km) deep covering the crater, and the town of Ames is located approximately in the middle of the crater. The crater is 8 miles (13 km) in diameter and is similar to craters on the moon. It is one of the few oil-producing craters in the world. Cumulative production figures through the end of 2006 show production in the Ames crater area approaching 11 million barrels.

== Annual events ==
Every year in the month of August, the town celebrates Ames Day, both to commemorate the founding of the town and to raise funds for the town's volunteer fire department. Ames Day celebrations have included parades, golf tournaments, pie auctions, turtle races, greased pig chases, mutton busting competitions, chicken roping, cow patty bingo, tug of war competitions, baseball games, beard-growing contests, and husband-calling competitions.

== Demographics ==
Historical population
| Census | Pop. | Note | %± |
|---|---|---|---|
| 1920 | 278 | | — |
| 1930 | 290 | | 4.3% |
| 1940 | 332 | | 14.5% |
| 1950 | 263 | | −20.8% |
| 1960 | 211 | | −19.8% |
| 1970 | 227 | | 7.6% |
| 1980 | 314 | | 38.3% |
| 1990 | 268 | | −14.6% |
| 2000 | 199 | | −25.7% |
| 2010 | 239 | | 20.1% |
| 2020 | 193 | | −19.2% |
U.S. Decennial Census

=== 2020 census ===
As of the 2020 census, Ames had a population of 193. The median age was 36.8 years. 21.2% of residents were under the age of 18 and 19.7% of residents were 65 years of age or older. For every 100 females there were 105.3 males, and for every 100 females age 18 and over there were 97.4 males age 18 and over.

0.0% of residents lived in urban areas, while 100.0% lived in rural areas.

There were 94 households in Ames, of which 33.0% had children under the age of 18 living in them. Of all households, 45.7% were married-couple households, 22.3% were households with a male householder and no spouse or partner present, and 24.5% were households with a female householder and no spouse or partner present. About 29.8% of all households were made up of individuals and 12.7% had someone living alone who was 65 years of age or older.

There were 98 housing units, of which 4.1% were vacant. The homeowner vacancy rate was 0.0% and the rental vacancy rate was 0.0%.

Racial composition as of the 2020 census
| Race | Number | Percent |
|---|---|---|
| White | 165 | 85.5% |
| Black or African American | 0 | 0.0% |
| American Indian and Alaska Native | 1 | 0.5% |
| Asian | 0 | 0.0% |
| Native Hawaiian and Other Pacific Islander | 0 | 0.0% |
| Some other race | 8 | 4.1% |
| Two or more races | 19 | 9.8% |
| Hispanic or Latino (of any race) | 22 | 11.4% |

=== 2010 census ===
As of the census of 2010, there were 239 people living in the town. The population density was 800 inhabitants per square mile (310/km^{2}). There were 111 housing units at an average density of 373 per square mile (144/km^{2}). The racial makeup of the town was 97.99% White, 2.01% from other races. Hispanic or Latino of any race were 4.52% of the population.

There were 91 households, out of which 23.1% had children under the age of 18 living with them, 57.1% were married couples living together, 7.7% had a female householder with no husband present, and 31.9% were non-families. 30.8% of all households were made up of individuals, and 19.8% had someone living alone who was 65 years of age or older. The average household size was 2.19 and the average family size was 2.69.

In the town, the population was spread out, with 21.1% under the age of 18, 5.0% from 18 to 24, 25.1% from 25 to 44, 25.6% from 45 to 64, and 23.1% who were 65 years of age or older. The median age was 44 years. For every 100 females, there were 97.0 males. For every 100 females age 18 and over, there were 91.5 males.

The median income for a household in the town was $26,563, and the median income for a family was $33,438. Males had a median income of $26,563 versus $18,750 for females. The per capita income for the town was $12,566. About 19.7% of families and 22.9% of the population were below the poverty line, including 46.9% of those under the age of eighteen and 14.0% of those 65 or over.
