= Rock Elm Disturbance =

Impact crater in Wisconsin, United States

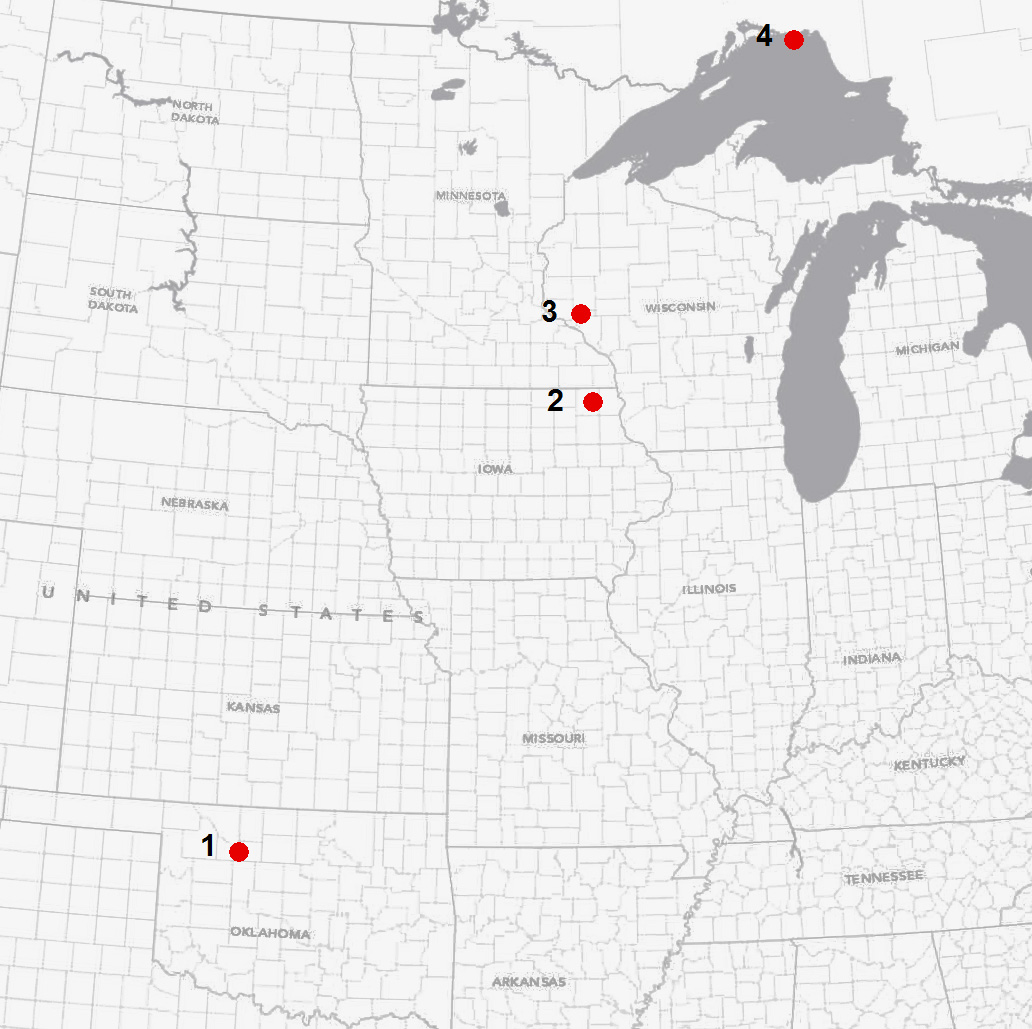
- North American Middle Ordovician impact craters, which may be part of the Ordovician meteor event. Key: 1: Ames crater, 2: Decorah crater, 3: Rock Elm Disturbance, 4: Slate Islands crater

- Location within the United States
- Location: Rock Elm, Pierce County, Wisconsin, United States; 44°43′N 92°14′W

Impact crater structure
- Confidence: Confirmed
- Diameter: 6 km (3.7 mi)
- Age: 430-455 Ma; Middle Ordovician
- Exposed: -
- Drilled: -
- Bolide type: Ordovician meteor event?

The Rock Elm Disturbance is an impact crater in Pierce County, Wisconsin, United States, roughly 40 kilometres (25 mi) southwest of Menomonie. The disturbance is named for Rock Elm, Wisconsin, a nearby town.

== Description ==
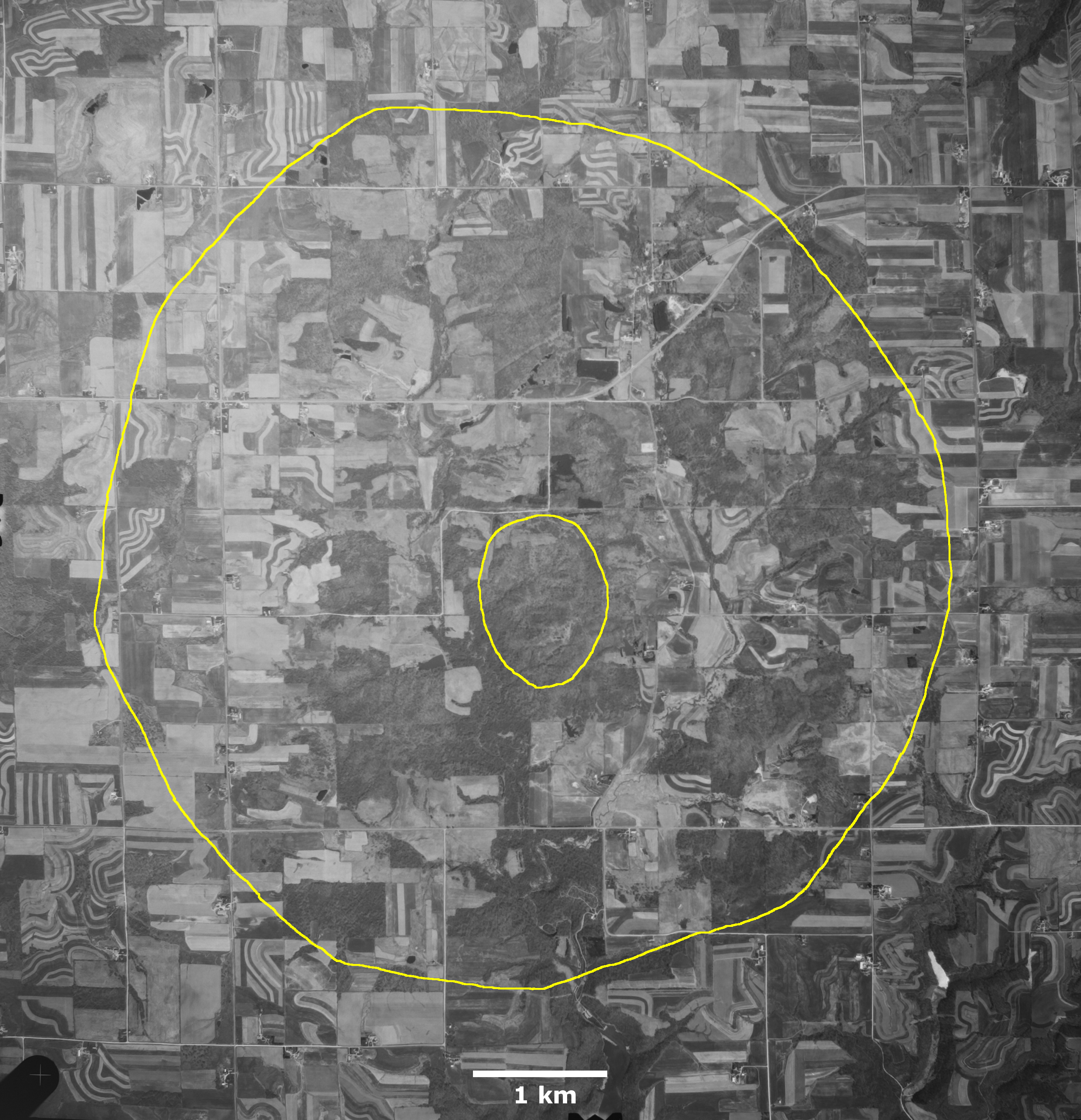
Rock Elm Disturbance as mapped by William S. Cordua in 1987. Outer line is extent of crater and inner line is central uplift.

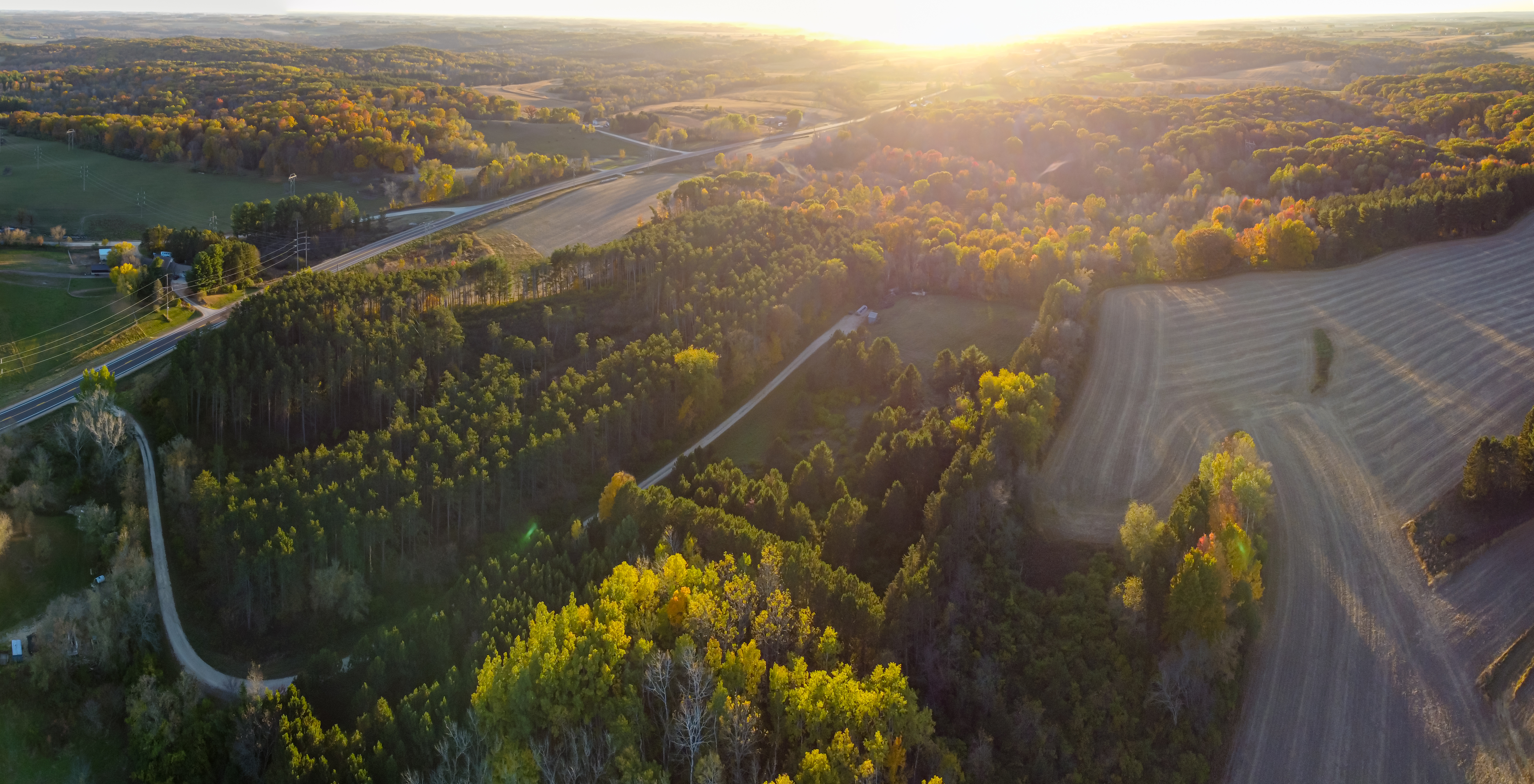
Looking southwest from above the town of Rock Elm towards the central uplift area of the crater.

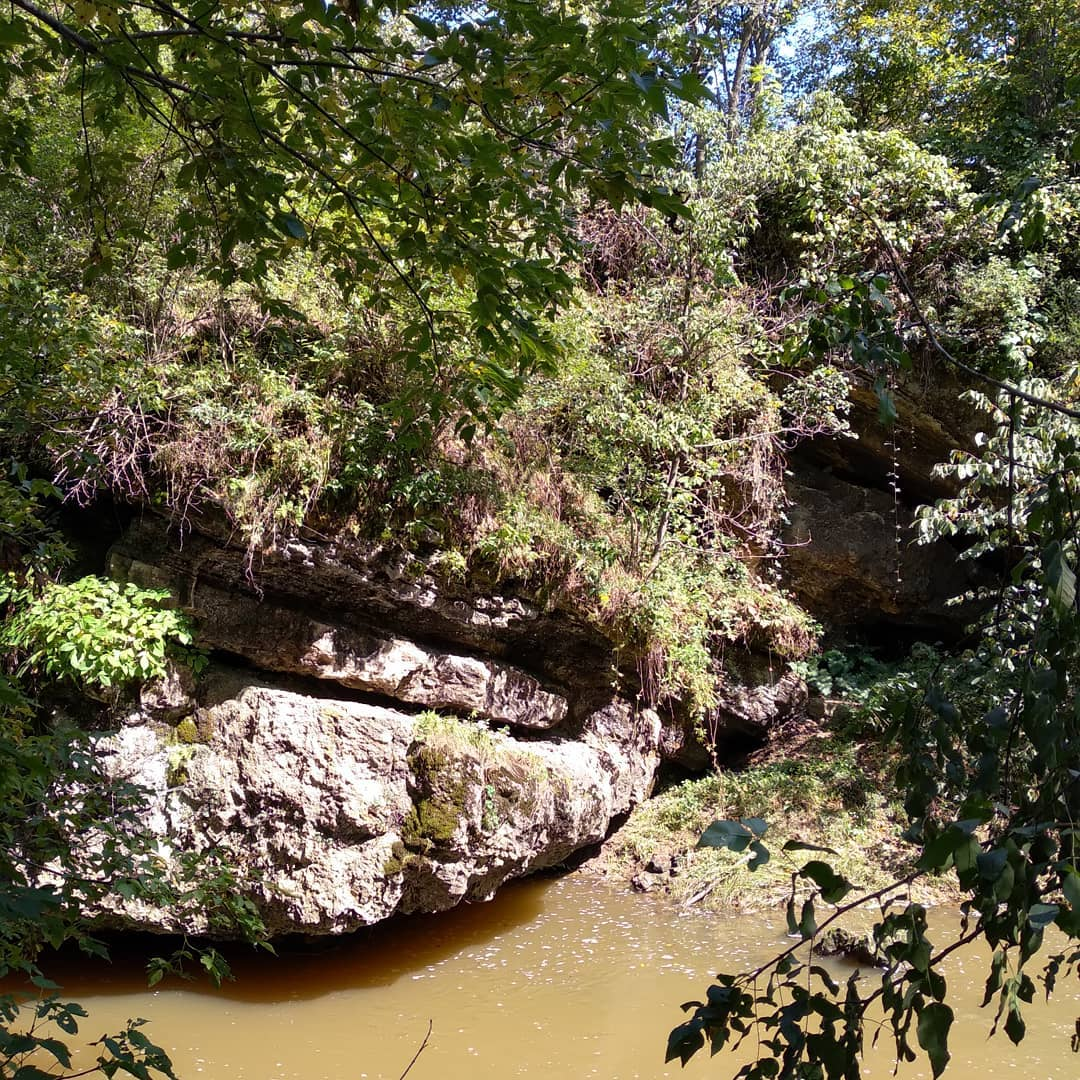
Blue Rock, a faulted portion of Prairie du Chien sandstone, is visible from the Underlook Trail at Nugget Lake County Park. Note that this sedimentary rock typically demonstrates horizontal stratification.

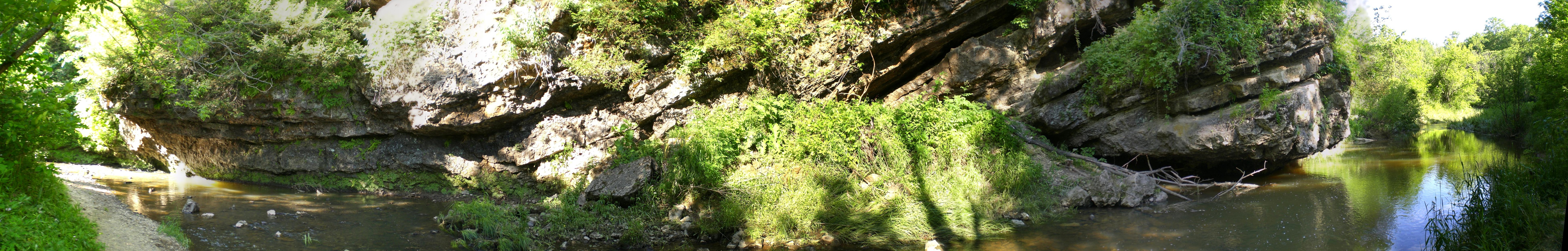
Panoramic context of Blue Rock faulted portion of Prairie du Chien sandstone.

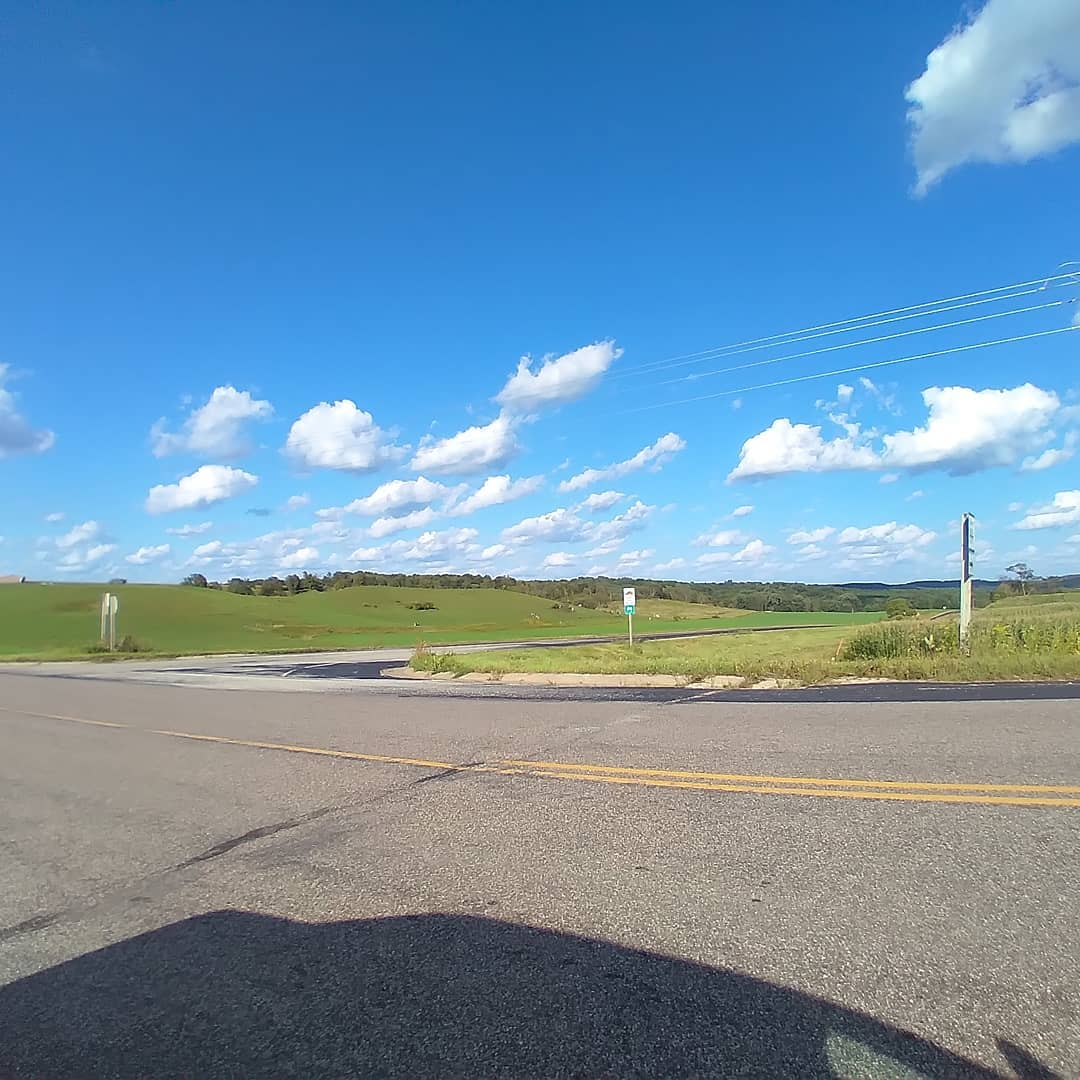
The disturbance area as seen from County Highway HH and County Road CC near Plum City, Wisconsin

The meteorite that caused the impact crater is estimated to have been 170 m (560 ft) in diameter with a mass of 9×10^{9} kg (2.0×10^{10} lb) and impact velocity of 30 km/s (67,000 mph).

The crater is 6 km (3.7 mi) in diameter, and fossils found in the rock filling the crater suggest it dates to the Middle Ordovician Period, about 455 to 430 million years ago. It may be one of several Middle Ordovician meteors that fell roughly simultaneously 469 million years ago, part of a proposed Ordovician meteor event within the continental United States that includes the Decorah crater in Iowa, the Slate Islands crater in Lake Superior, and the Ames crater in Oklahoma.

== Crater characteristics ==
A raised area at the center of the crater 0.8 km (0.5 mi) wide by 2.4 km (1.5 mi) long suggests that the impact caused a major upheaval of lower-lying rock— breccia and Mount Simon Sandstone, which lies beneath the surface and is much older than the rock layers in the area surrounding it. Additionally, Blue Rock, an exposed portion of faulted Prairie du Chien sandstone, lies at the south of the crater's edge, which can be viewed at Nugget Lake County Park.

=== Discovery of reidite ===
While studying the effects of erosion on areas of meteorite impact, researchers from the University of Puerto Rico discovered a rare high-pressure mineral, reidite, at the center of the Rock Elm impact site. Reidite is a dense form of zircon (ZrSiO_{4}) that is formed by the intense heat and pressure caused by an impacting meteorite. The reidite found at the Rock Elm structure is the oldest known example of the mineral. It has been found in other impact sites such as the Xiuyan crater in China; the Chesapeake Bay impact crater in Virginia, United States; and the Nordlinger Ries crater in Germany.
