= Österplana 065 =

Meteorite found in Sweden

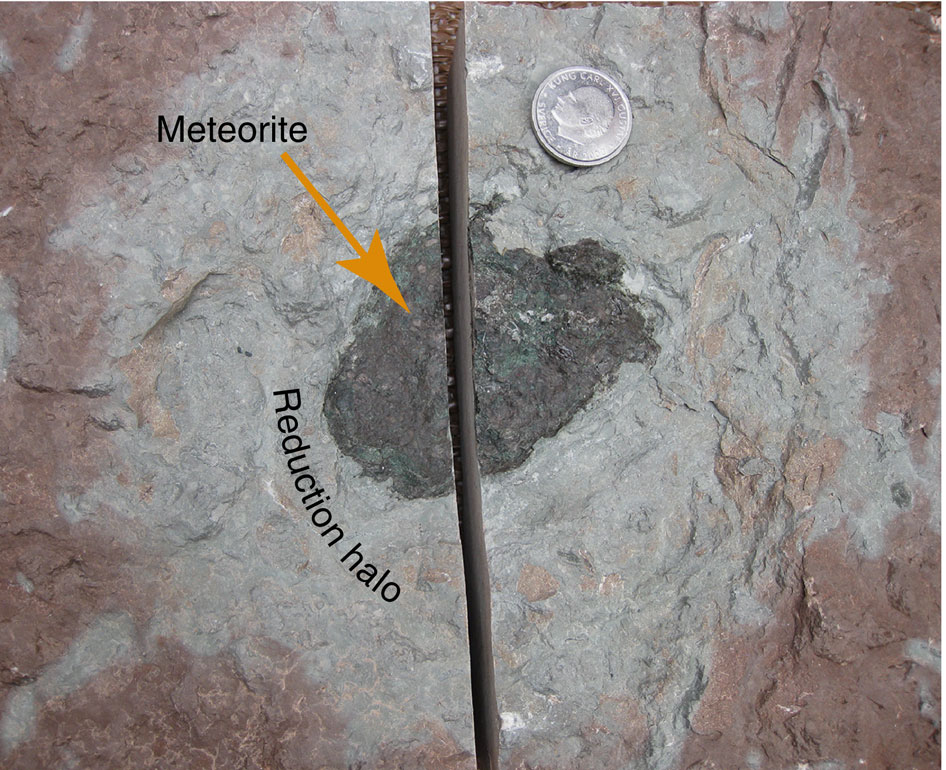
- Type: Unknown
- Composition: Chromium, spinel, rutile
- Shock stage: yes
- Country: Sweden
- Coordinates: 58°35′N 13°26′E
- Observed fall: No
- Alternative names: Öst 65
- Related media on Wikimedia Commons

Österplana 065 (Öst 65) is an Ordovician fossil meteorite found in the Thorsberg quarry in Sweden on June 26, 2011, and scientifically described in 2016. Measuring 8×6.5×2 cm, it impacted the Earth 470 million years ago, during the Ordovician. According to the naming conventions of the Meteoritical Society, the meteorite was named after the locality at which it was found, Österplana within the Kinnekulle mountain plateau.

The meteorite type does not fit into existing meteorite classification. It was preliminarily classified as "winonaite-like". The level of chromium isotope ^{54}Cr in Österplana 065 is similar to those in ordinary chondrites, while oxygen isotopes are similar to those in some rare primitive achondrites. Österplana 065 also features a chromium-spinel–rutile assemblage, not observed in other meteorites.

Österplana 065 is believed to have originated from a larger asteroid, and belongs to a meteorite type that does not presently fall on the Earth.

== See also ==
- Ordovician meteor event
