= Rock Elm, Wisconsin =

- Town
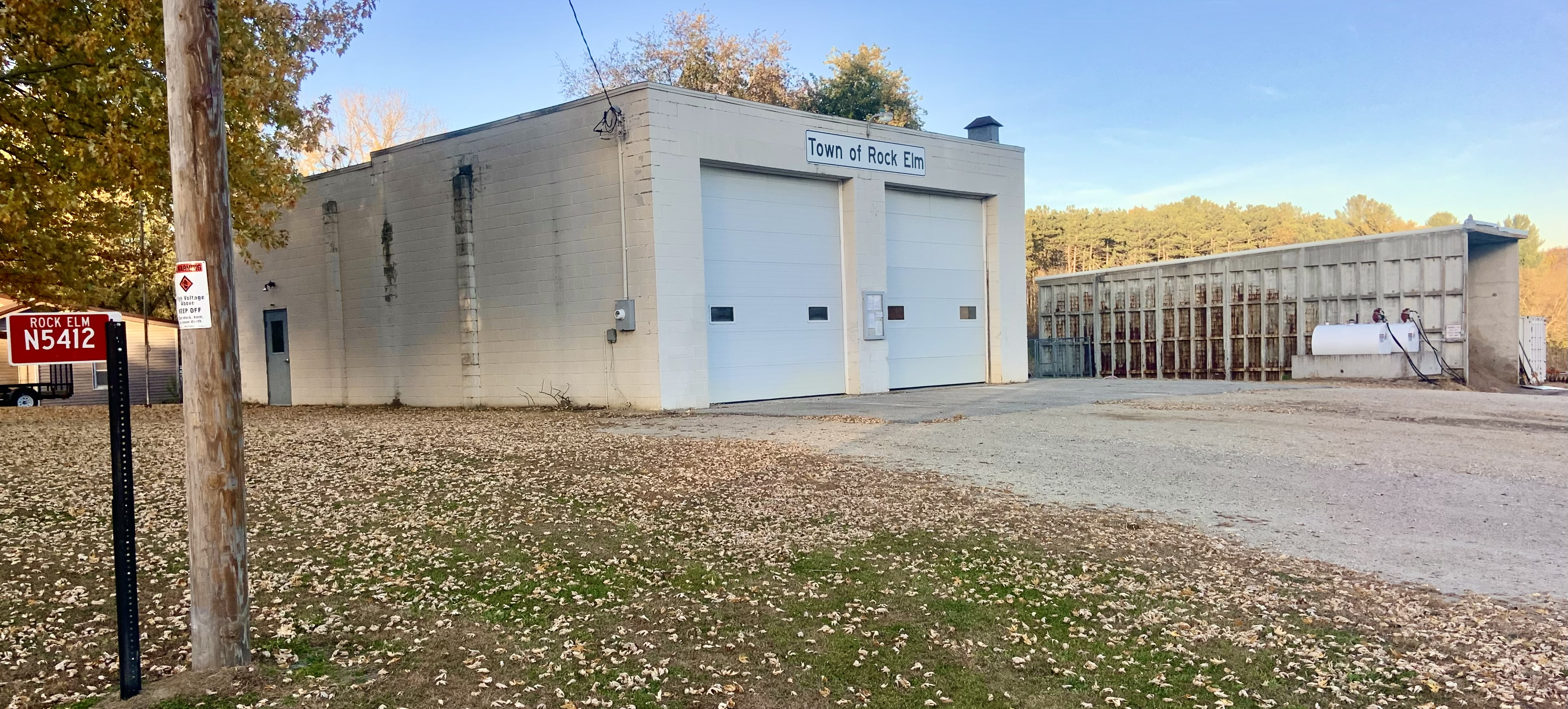
- Town hall

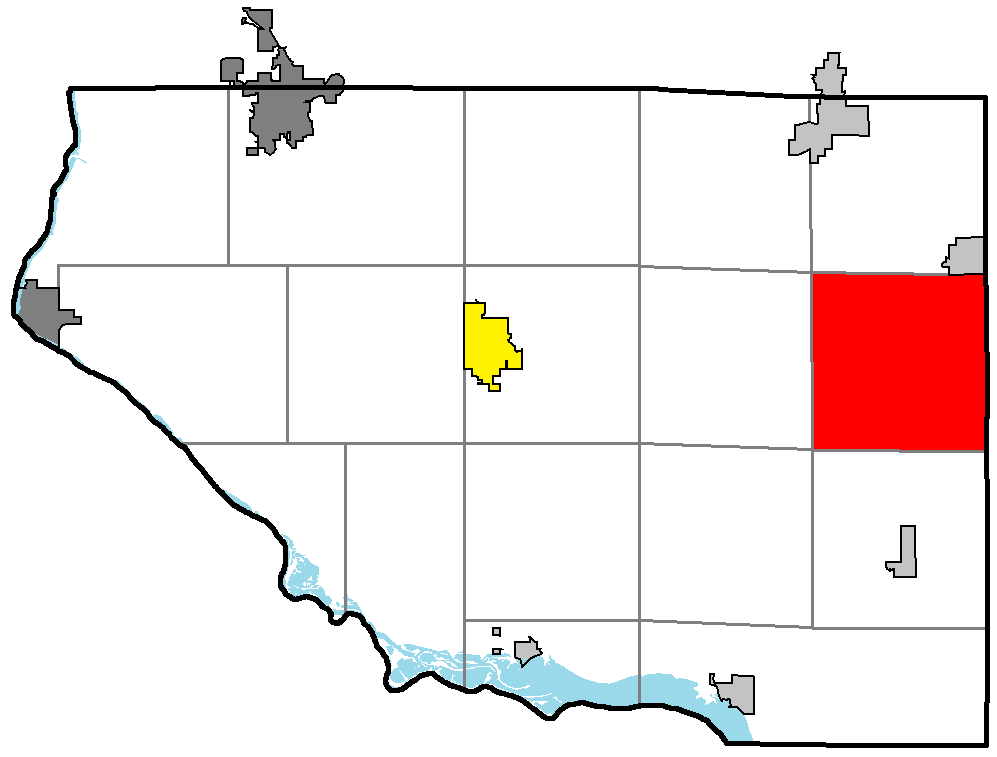
- Location of Rock Elm, within Pierce County

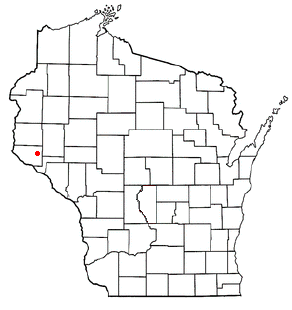
- Location of Rock Elm, Wisconsin
- Coordinates: 44°43′18″N 92°11′57″W
- Country: United States
- State: Wisconsin
- County: Pierce

Area
  - Total: 35.8 sq mi (92.8 km^{2})
  - Land: 35.8 sq mi (92.8 km^{2})
  - Water: 0 sq mi (0.0 km^{2})
- Elevation: 1,053 ft (321 m)

Population (2020)
  - Total: 447
  - Density: 12.5/sq mi (4.82/km^{2})
- Time zone: UTC-6 (Central (CST))
  - Summer (DST): UTC-5 (CDT)
- Area codes: 715 & 534
- FIPS code: 55-68775
- GNIS feature ID: 1584053
- Website: https://www.townofrockelm.com/

Rock Elm is a town in Pierce County, Wisconsin, United States. The population was 447 at the 2020 census. The unincorporated communities of Exile and Rock Elm are located in the town. The unincorporated community of Waverly is also located partially in the town.

== Geology ==
The Rock Elm Disturbance, a probable impact crater, is located near Rock Elm. The rare mineral reidite has been found within the structure.

== Geography ==
According to the United States Census Bureau, the town has a total area of 35.8 square miles (92.8 km^{2}), of which 35.8 square miles (92.8 km^{2}) is land and 0.03% is water.

== Demographics ==
As of the census of 2000, there were 504 people, 178 households, and 132 families residing in the town. The population density was 14.1 inhabitants per square mile (5.4/km^{2}). There were 193 housing units at an average density of 5.4 per square mile (2.1/km^{2}). The racial makeup of the town was 97.82% White, 0.40% African American, 0.99% Native American, 0.40% from other races, and 0.40% from two or more races.

There were 178 households, out of which 32.6% had children under the age of 18 living with them, 65.2% were married couples living together, 3.9% had a female householder with no husband present, and 25.3% were non-families. 19.1% of all households were made up of individuals, and 7.3% had someone living alone who was 65 years of age or older. The average household size was 2.83 and the average family size was 3.26.

In the town, the population was spread out, with 28.4% under the age of 18, 9.5% from 18 to 24, 27.4% from 25 to 44, 21.8% from 45 to 64, and 12.9% who were 65 years of age or older. The median age was 35 years. For every 100 females, there were 105.7 males. For every 100 females age 18 and over, there were 111.1 males.

The median income for a household in the town was $36,750, and the median income for a family was $47,143. Males had a median income of $30,000 versus $23,542 for females. The per capita income for the town was $17,838. About 11.6% of families and 18.2% of the population were below the poverty line, including 31.9% of those under age 18 and 10.7% of those age 65 or over.
