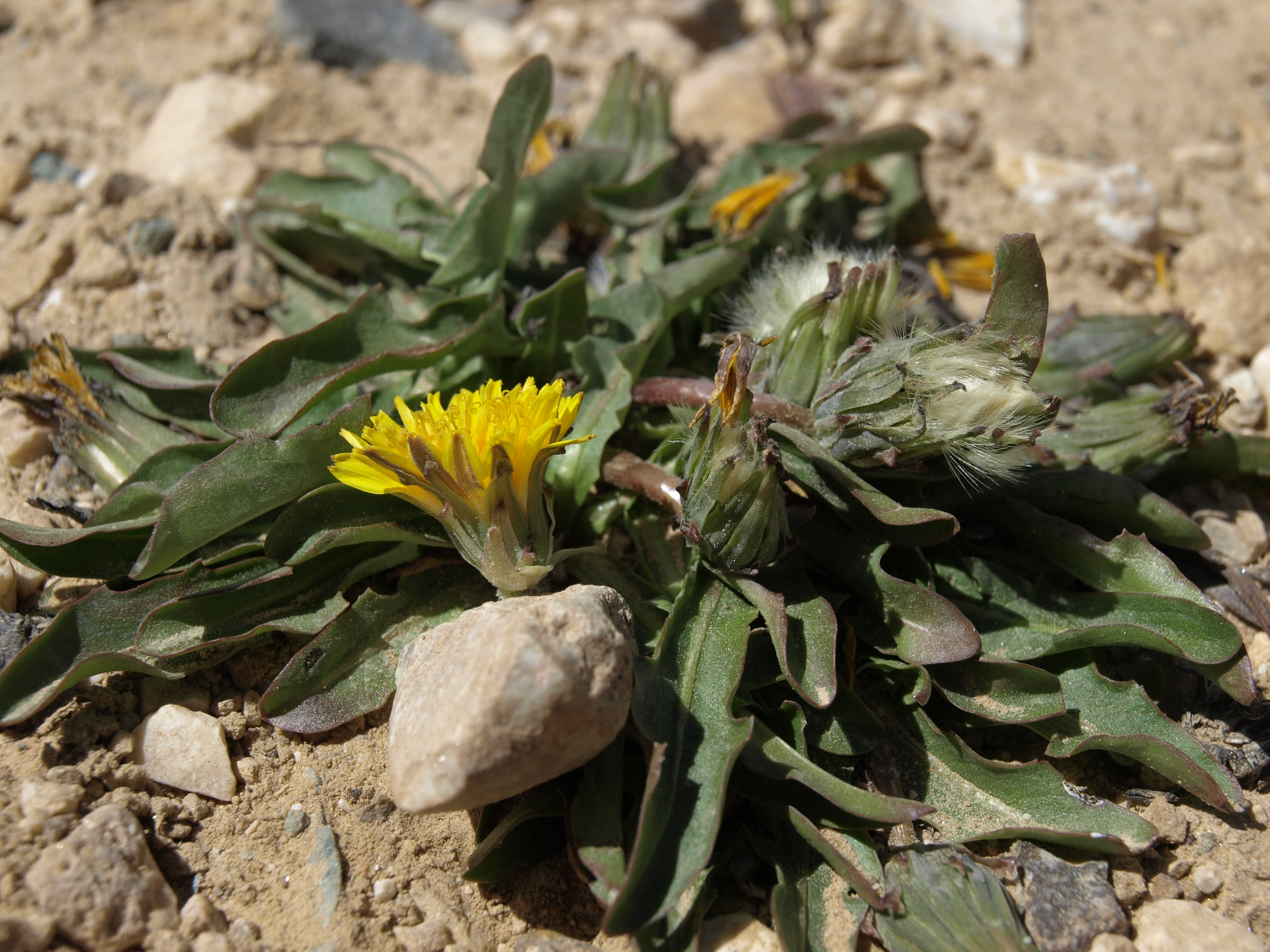

Scientific classification
- Kingdom: Plantae
- Clade: Tracheophytes
- Clade: Angiosperms
- Clade: Eudicots
- Clade: Asterids
- Order: Asterales
- Family: Asteraceae
- Genus: Taraxacum
- Species: T. ceratophorum

Binomial name
- Taraxacum ceratophorum (Ledeb.) DC.

Synonyms
- List: Leontodon ceratophorus Ledeb. 1829; Leontodon dumetorum Rydb. 1917; Leontodon eriophorum Rydb. 1917; Taraxacum alaid-litorale H.Koidz. 1935; Taraxacum altaicum Schischk. 1949; Taraxacum ambigens var. fultius Fernald 1933; Taraxacum angulatum G.E.Haglund 1948; Taraxacum arctogenum Dahlst. 1906; Taraxacum brevicorne Dahlst. 1906; Taraxacum callorhinorum G.E.Haglund 1937; Taraxacum carthamopsis Porsild 1939; Taraxacum ceratophorum subsp. lacerum (Greene) Á.Löve & D.Löve 1982; Taraxacum chamarense Peschkova 1977; Taraxacum chamissonis Greene 1901; Taraxacum chirieanum Kitam. 1942; Taraxacum coverum R.Doll 1977; Taraxacum dumetorum Greene 1901; Taraxacum eriophorum Rydb. 1900; Taraxacum eurylepium Dahlst. 1910; Taraxacum evittatum Dahlst. 1930; Taraxacum frigicola H.Koidz. 1935; Taraxacum frigidum H.Koidz. 1935; Taraxacum grandifolium H.Koidz. 1935; Taraxacum grandisquamatum H.Koidz. 1936; Taraxacum groenlandicum Dahlst. 1906; Taraxacum hultenii Dahlst. 1926; Taraxacum hyperboreum Dahlst. 1910; Taraxacum integratiforme R.Doll 1977; Taraxacum integratum G.E.Haglund 1948; Taraxacum kljutschevskoanum Kom. 1930; Taraxacum koraginense Kom. 1930; Taraxacum koraginicola Kom. 1930; Taraxacum lacerum Greene 1901; Taraxacum lateritium var. amguemicum Tzvelev 1987; Taraxacum lateritium var. callorhinorum (G.E.Haglund) Tzvelev 1987; Taraxacum lateritium var. erdiljachicum Tzvelev 1987; Taraxacum latisquameum Dahlst. 1926; Taraxacum livens H.Koidz. 1933; Taraxacum longii Fernald 1933; Taraxacum macilentum var. hyperboreum (Dahlst.) Tzvelev 1987; Taraxacum mackenziense A.E.Porsild 1975; Taraxacum malaisei Dahlst. 1930; Taraxacum malteanum Dahlst. ex G.E.Haglund 1943; Taraxacum maurolepium G.E.Haglund 1949; Taraxacum megalanthum H.Koidz. 1935; Taraxacum microcerum R.Doll 1977; Taraxacum microcornum R.Doll 1977; Taraxacum multisulcatum H.Koidz. 1935; Taraxacum ovinum Greene 1901; Taraxacum pellianum A.E.Porsild 1950; Taraxacum platyceras Dahlst. 1926; Taraxacum pseudolasianthum H.Koidz. 1934; Taraxacum pseudonorvegicum Dahlst. ex G.E.Haglund 1943; Taraxacum sachalinense Kitam. 1933; Taraxacum shimushirense Tatew. & Kitam. 1934; Taraxacum trigonolobum Dahlst. 1926; Taraxacum umbriniforme R.Doll 1977; Taraxacum umbrinum Dahlst. ex G.E.Haglund 1943; Taraxacum yamamotoi Koidz. ex Kitam. 1933; Taraxacum yesoalpinum Nakai ex Koidz. 1933

= Taraxacum ceratophorum =

Species of flowering plant

Taraxacum ceratophorum, also known as the horned dandelion, is a species of flowering plant within the genus Taraxacum and family Asteraceae. This alpine species has a preference for mountainous habitat, where it can be found growing at elevations up to 3000 meters above sea level. It is native to a large portion of the Northern Hemisphere, inhabiting various countries within Asia, Europe and North America.

== Description ==
Taraxacum ceratophorum is a species of herbaceous perennial plant. The species typically reaches heights ranging from 5 to 30 cm tall. The plant possesses a taproot and a caudex, with the caudex measuring approximately 5 to 10 mm in diameter. The species is diploid and exhibits chromosomal polymorphism with a chromosome count of 2n = 16, 18, 28, 32, or 40.

Taraxacum ceratophorum

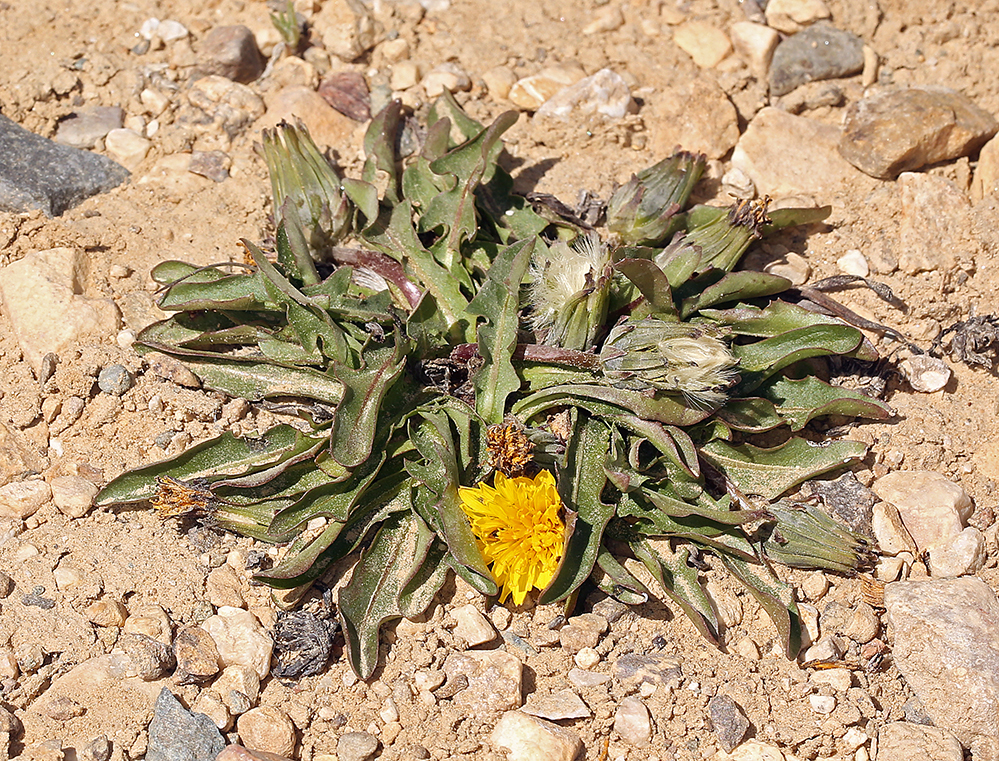

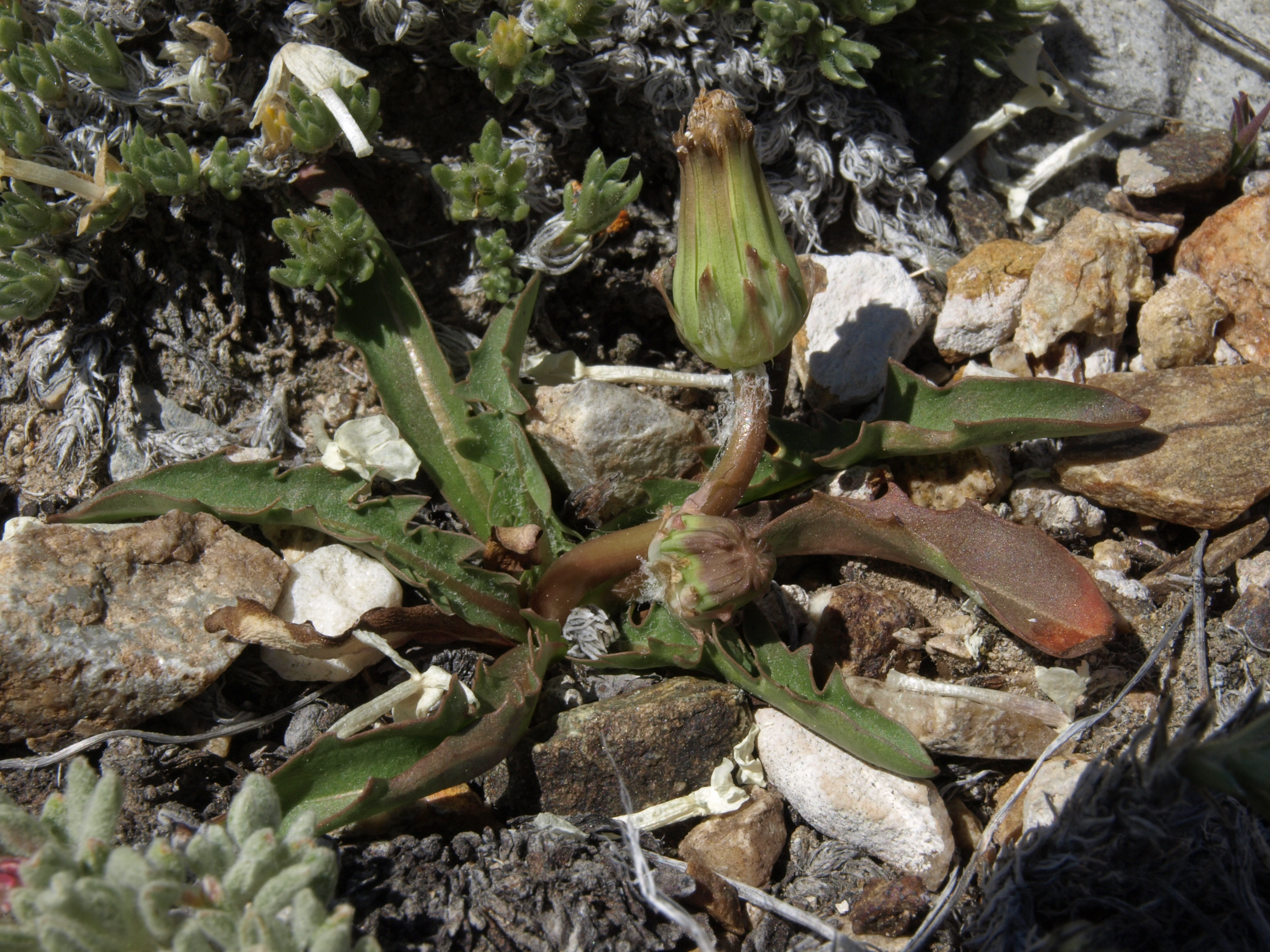

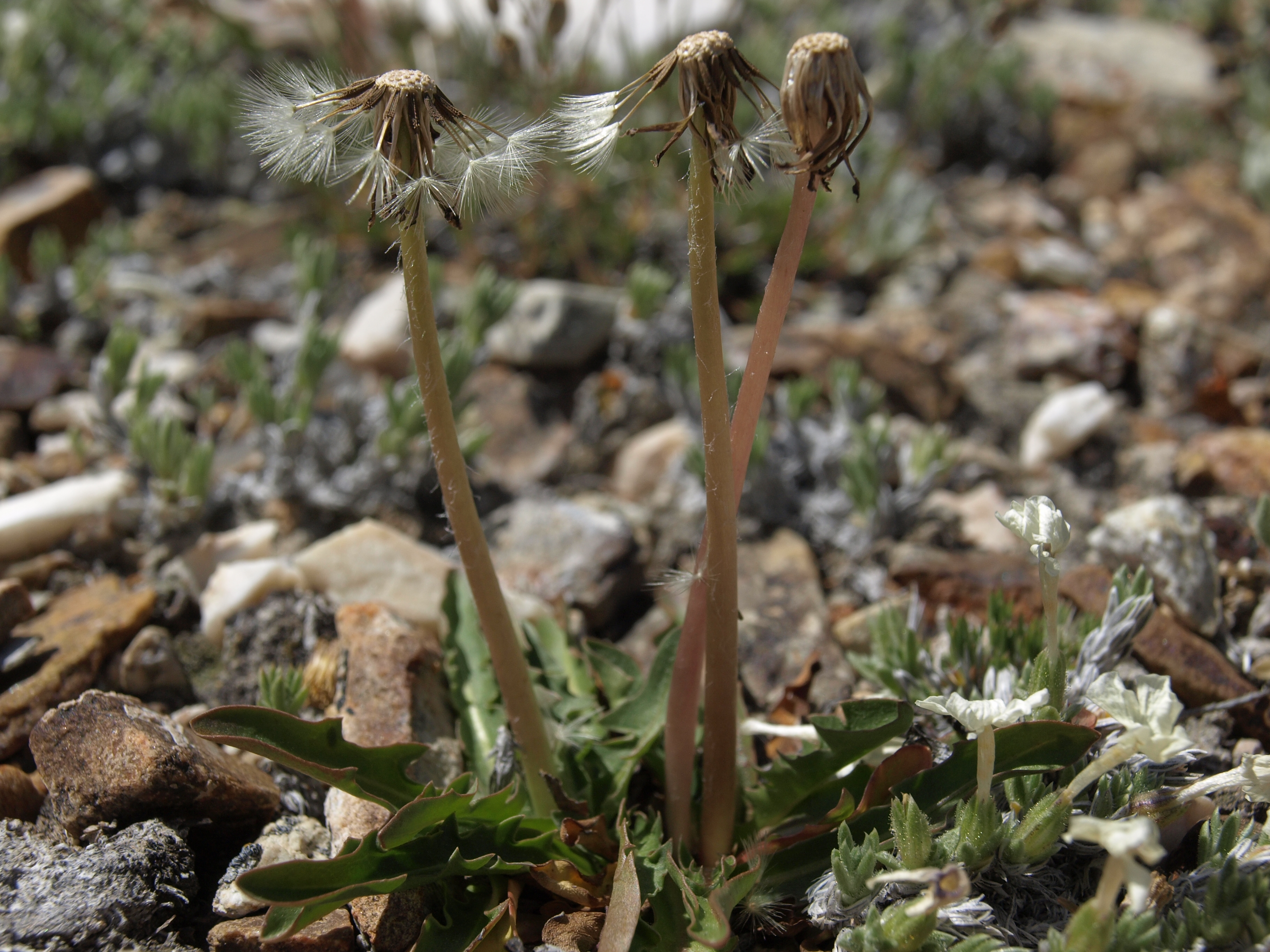

=== Leaves ===
The leaves of Taraxacum ceratophorum are primarily basal, with a patent or erect orientation. They are alternate in arrangement and die annually. Petioles may or may not be present, ranging from 0 to 40 (or occasionally up to 70) mm in length. These petioles can be winged, either broadly or narrowly, and are typically glabrous. The leaf blades of this species are simple in structure, with attenuate bases. They measure 50 to 120 mm in length and 7 to 30 mm in width, displaying an oblanceolate shape. The blades are flat and appear to have a single vein or pinnate veins. The adaxial surface of the blade is glabrous, as is the abaxial surface. The blades can be broadly or narrowly lobed, with runcinate and dentate margins. The degree of incision can range from 5% to 95%, and the apices of the lobes are acute. The blade margins may exhibit between 1 and 8 (or occasionally up to 11) teeth on each side, counting both the dentations and tips of the runcinate lobes. These teeth are located toward the apex of the blade.

The leaves of Taraxacum ceratophorum

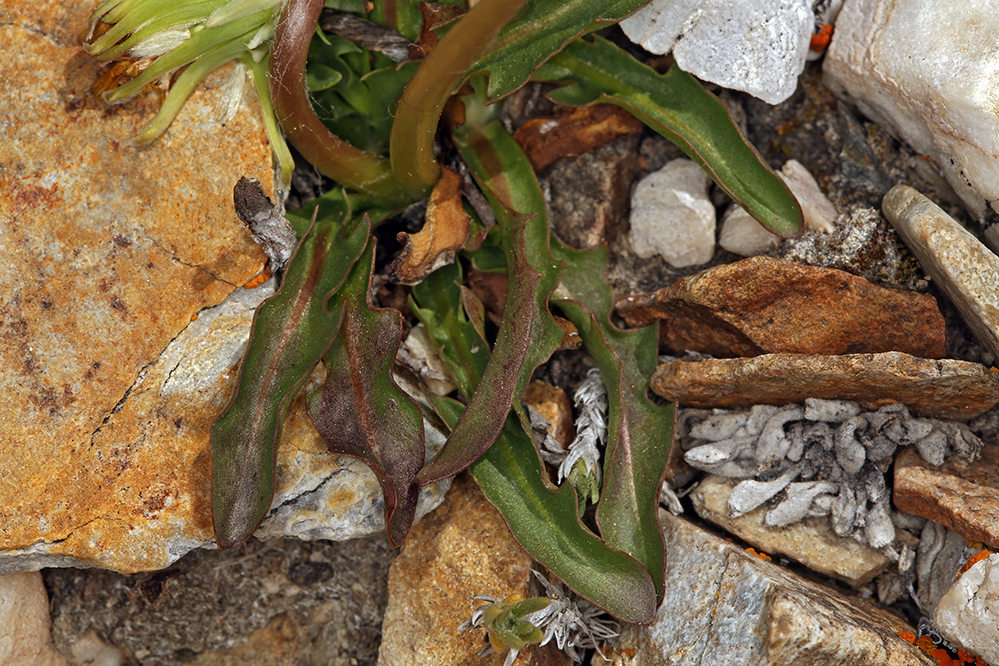

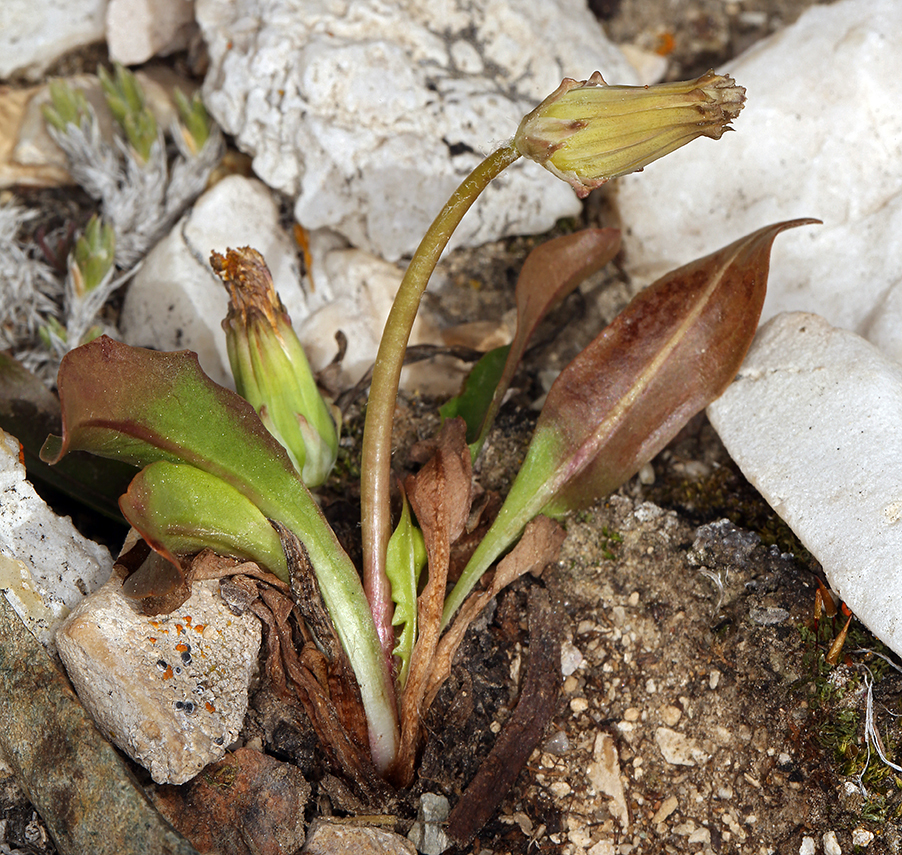

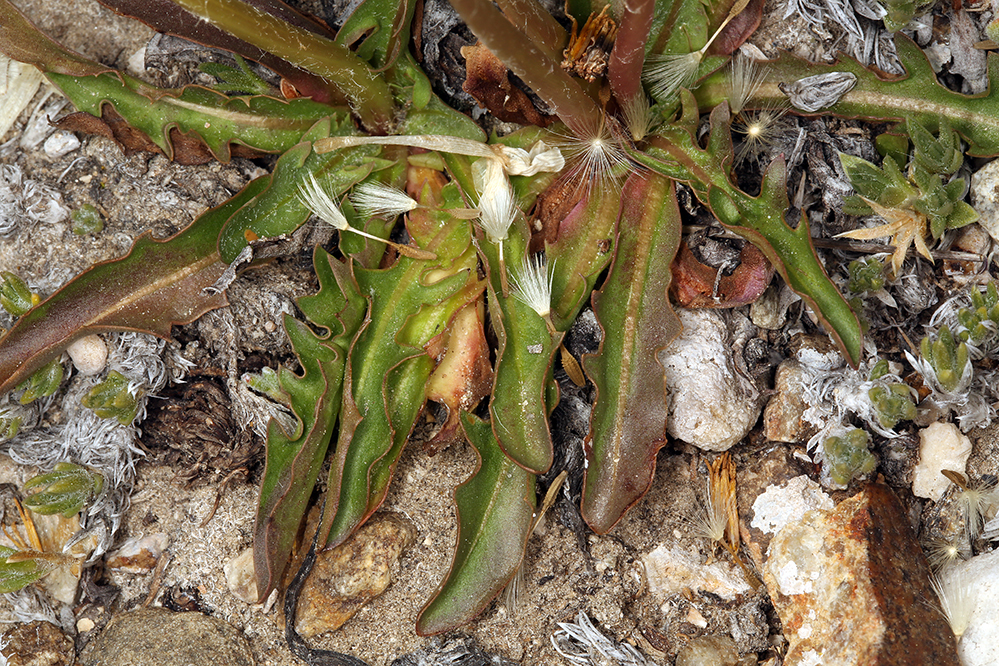

=== Flower ===
Taraxacum ceratophorum bears flowers on stems that lack leaves. The flowering stems are hairy, with simple hairs that are longer than the diameter of the stem. These hairs are white or translucent and become floccose near the inflorescence. The flowers are arranged in solitary heads, which are approximately 15 to 30 mm deep when viewed from the side and 30 to 40 mm wide. Only ligulate florets are present in the heads, and there are no pedicels. Involucral bracts are present, with 2 to 3 rows. The outer involucral bracts are predominantly dark green, lying adjacent to the flowers. They are ovate or lanceolate, tapering toward a narrow apex and measuring 5.5 to 11 mm in height and 1 to 3.5 mm in width (noticeably longer than wide and proportionately narrow). These bracts are glabrous. The inner involucral bracts are lanceolate, ranging from 12 to 20 mm in height and 2.5 to 3 mm in width. Their margins are narrow and scarious, occupying less than one-quarter of the bract, and their apices are prominently horned or callosed.

Each inflorescence of Taraxacum ceratophorum typically contains 40 to 60 bilaterally symmetrical (zygomorphic) flowers. The sepals are represented by a pappus, which consists of a single row of whitish hairs. The ligulate florets possess a pappus that measures 6 to 8 mm in length. The petals of the species are conventional, fused, and yellow, sometimes exhibiting a cream color when pressed, and with a greyish stripe in the outer petals. Fresh flowers may lack contrasting markings, but these markings may appear as greyish tinges upon drying. The corolla is flat and strap-like, and the limb of the ray florets is 1.5 to 2.5 mm wide. The limb of the ligulate florets measures 40 to 60 mm in length and 10 to 14 mm in width. Taraxacum ceratophorum has five stamens with yellow anthers measuring 2.8 to 4.2 mm in length. The ovary is inferior, comprising two syncarpous carpels. It features a single style that is 7 to 8 mm long (noticeably shorter than the petals). Each ovary has two stigmas, and the placentation is basal. There is one ovule per ovary.

The flower of Taraxacum ceratophorum

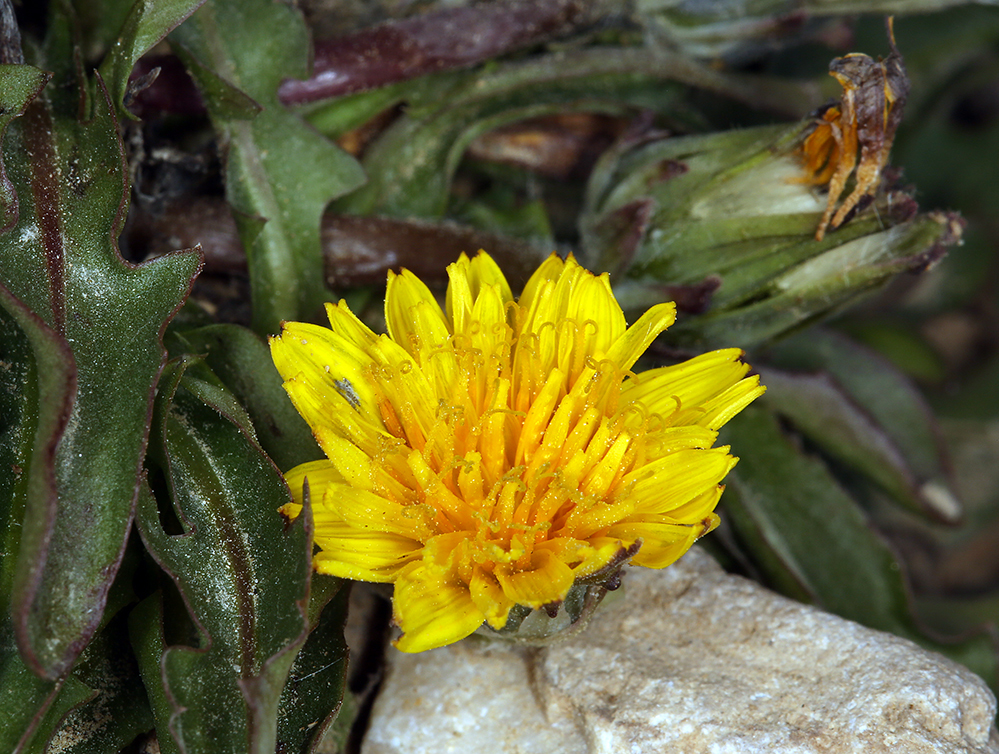

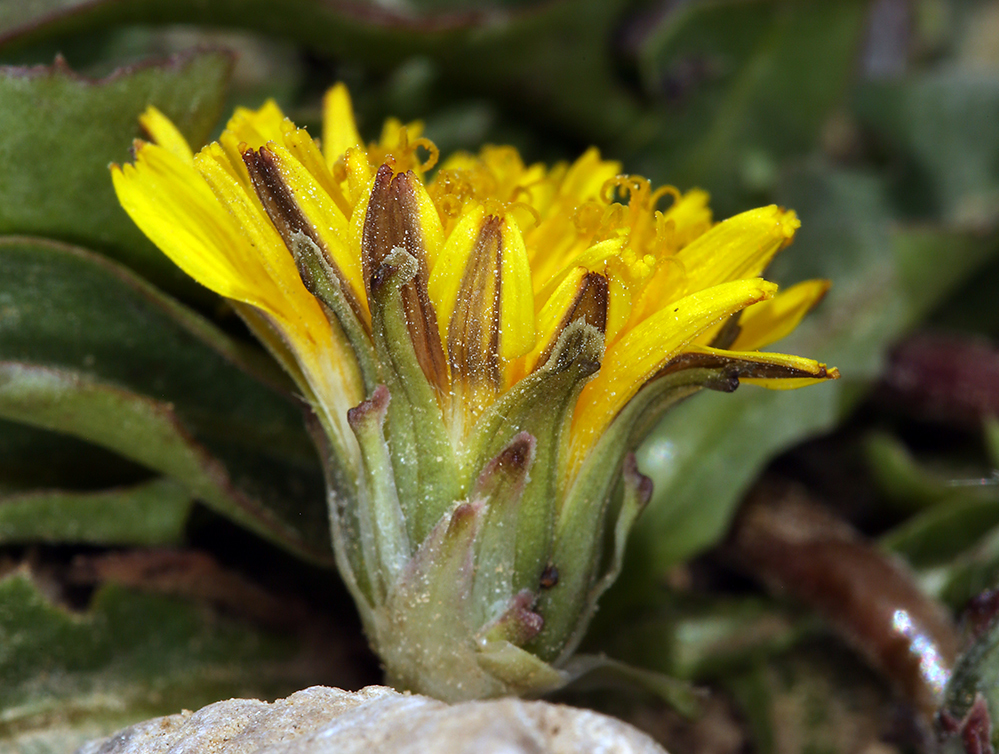

=== Fruit and seeds ===
The fruit of Taraxacum ceratophorum are sessile cypselas with a persisting calyx. They are dry, obovate, and typically a pale reddish brown or brick red colour. The cypselas measure 4 to 5 mm in length and 0.9 to 1.2 mm in width, appearing glabrous and exhibiting ribbed surface venation. They are indehiscent, and the slender beak of the cypselas often exceeds the length of the body. The upper half of the cypselas' surface is spinulose. Each cypselae possesses a single seed. The seeds utilize wind dispersal. The pappus of each seed helps amplify drag, which increases the chance that wind will carry it away and prolongs its descent.

The fruit and seeds of Taraxacum ceratophorum

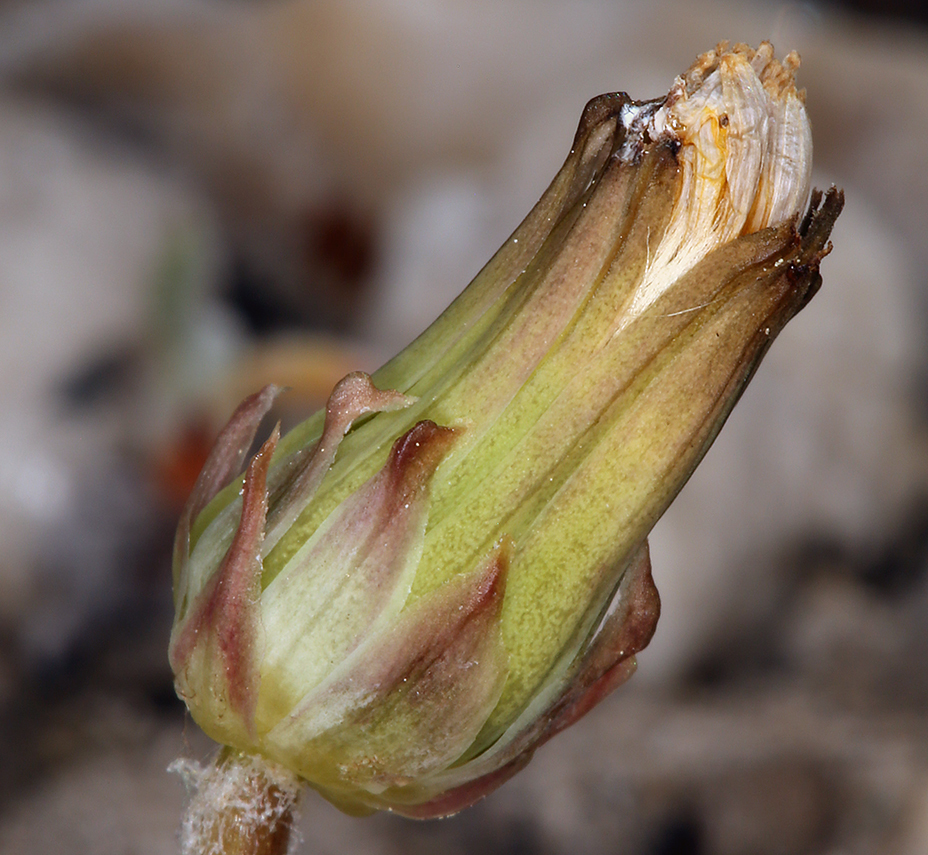
The developing seed head of Taraxacum ceratophorum.

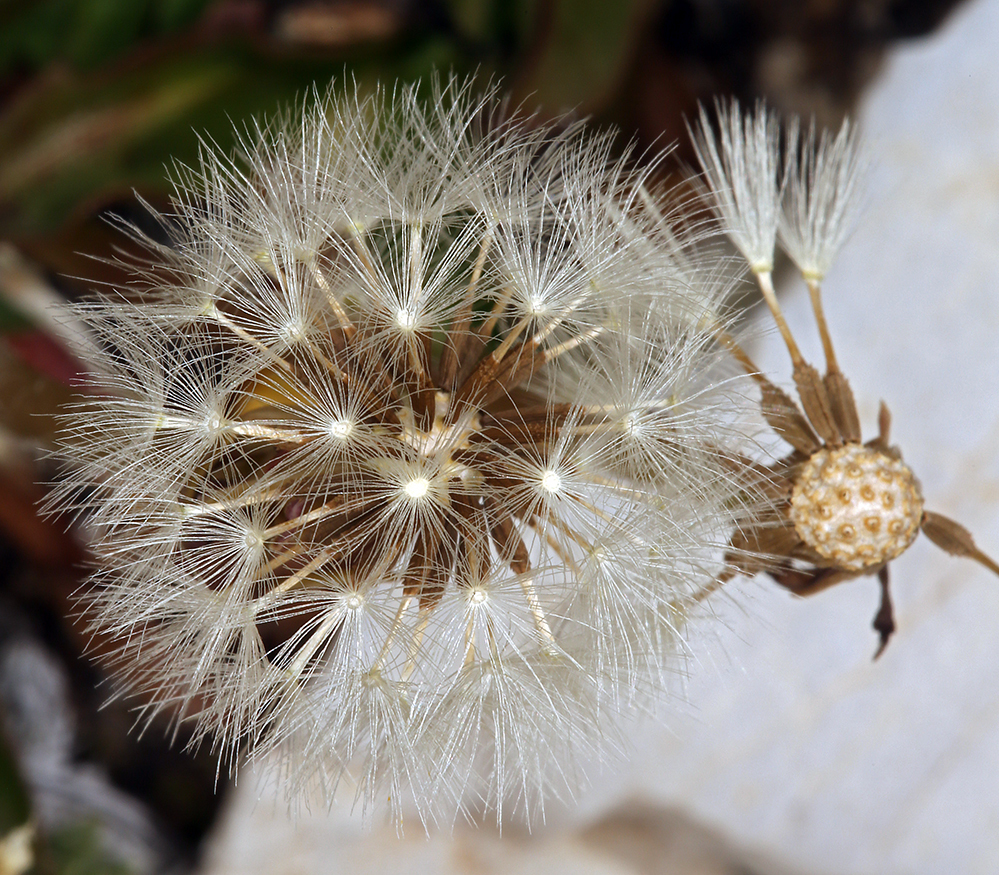
The seed head of Taraxacum ceratophorum.

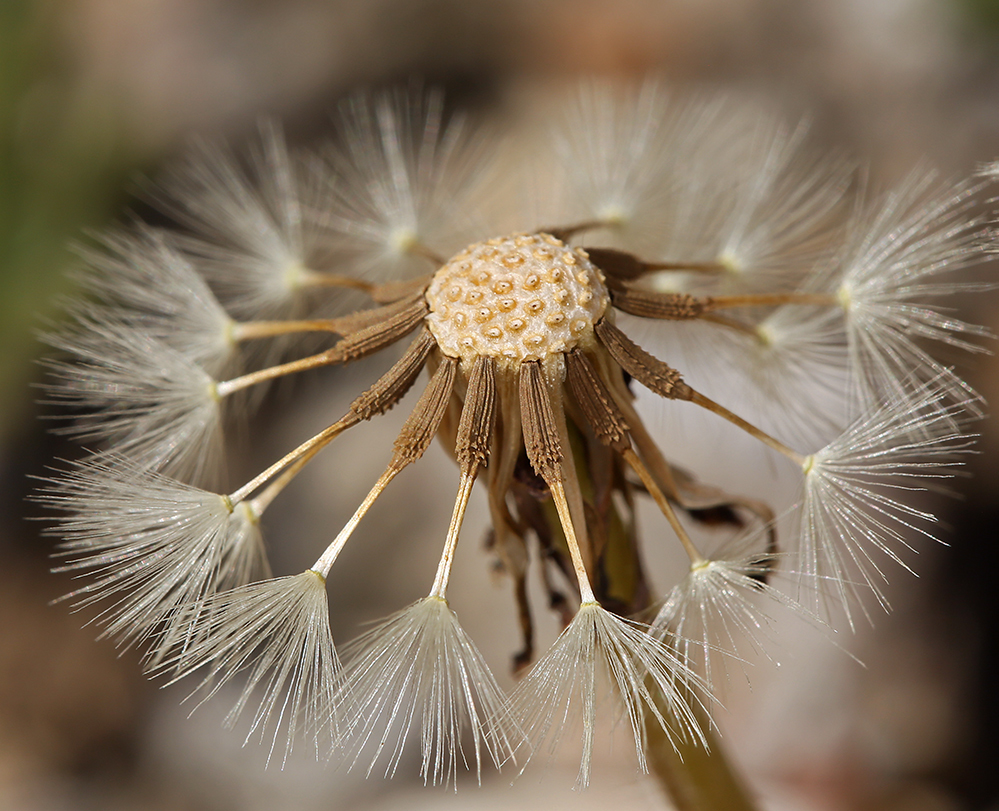
The seeds of Taraxacum ceratophorum.

=== Roots ===
Taraxacum ceratophorum possesses a taproot. The taproot is robust, supporting the growth and stability of the plant. Additionally, the species exhibits a caudex with a diameter of approximately 5 to 10 mm. The caudex serves as a transition zone between the taproot and the basal leaves.

== Distribution ==
Taraxacum ceratophorum has an extensive distribution, being present throughout much of the Northern Hemisphere within temperate Asia, Europe and North America. In Asia, the species can be found within the countries of Russia, Japan, Kazakhstan and Mongolia. In Europe the species is present in Norway, Sweden, Iceland, Great Britain and European Russia.

Taraxacum ceratophorum is also native to the United States of America within the states of: Alaska, California, Colorado, Montana, Nevada, New Mexico, Oregon, Utah, Washington and Wyoming. It is also present within Canada, where it can be found in the Canadian provinces of: Alberta, British Columbia, Labrador, Manitoba, Newfoundland, Northwest Territories, Nunavut, Ontario, Québec, Saskatchewan and Yukon.

== Habitat ==
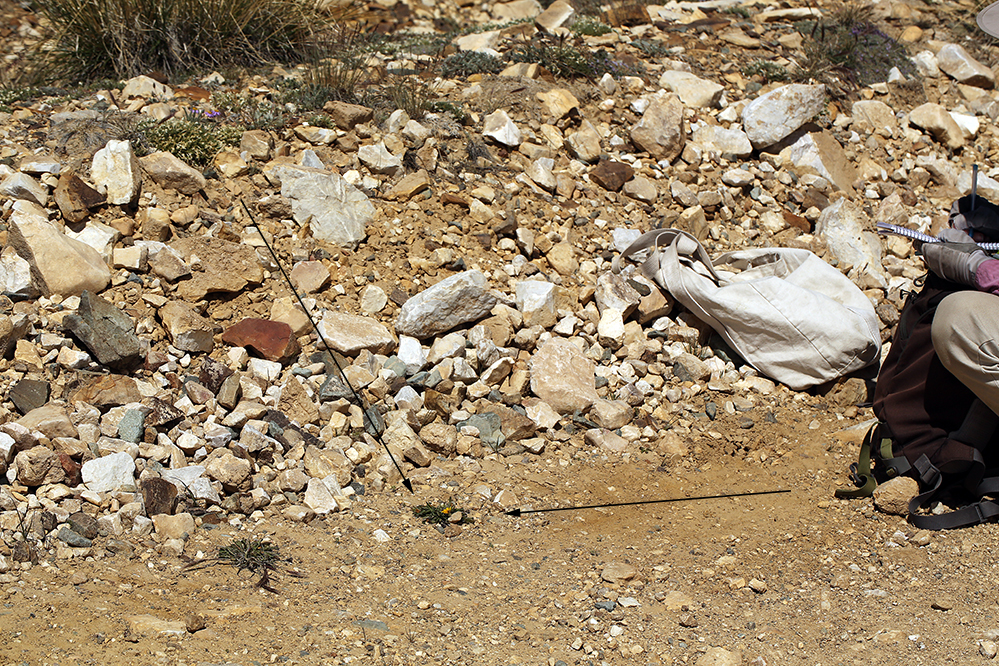
Taraxacum ceratophorum growing in its natural habitat.

Taraxacum ceratophorum inhabits the subalpine and alpine zones, where it grows in mountainous regions. The species can grow in both moist and dry conditions, inhabiting a variety of soil types including gravel, sand, and clay. The plant utilizes habitats such as alpine meadows, fellfields and rocky slopes. It will also colonize manmade habitat such as gravel roads. The species tends to be restricted to mountainous regions, typically above the treeline, where it can grow in areas of moist soil among large rocks. It can be found at elevations up to 3000 meters above sea level.

== Hybridization ==
Taraxacum ceratophorum is an obligate outcrosser and is capable of hybridization with other dandelion species such as T. officinale, as they can occur together and share a flowering period. T. ceratophorum produced viable seed when subjected to interspecific hand pollination with pollen from T. officinale. The molecular analysis of the resulting F1 offspring revealed that only 33.2% of the germinating seeds were hybrids, while the rest were offspring resulting from a breakdown in self-incompatibility known as the mentor effect. Although the mentor effect aids in minimizing hybrid production, the asymmetric direction of hybridization presents a potential risk of genetic assimilation.

Taraxacum ceratophorum, possesses a higher water-use efficiency than both T. officinale and their hybrid offspring. It is therefore theorized that arid habitats prone to drought may provide refuge for the species.
