= Reidite =

Polymorph of ZrSiO4

General
- Category: Zircon group
- Formula: ZrSiO_{4}
- IMA symbol: Rei
- Strunz classification: 9.AD.45
- Crystal system: Tetragonal
- Crystal class: Dipyramidal (4/m); H-M symbol: (4/m)
- Space group: I4_{1}/a
- Unit cell: a = 4.738, c = 10.506 [Å], Z = 4

Identification
- Formula mass: 183.31 g/mol
- Color: Colorless to white
- Crystal habit: Epitaxial - crystallographic alignment with a precursor mineral, occurs as inclusions in other minerals.
- Cleavage: None
- Fracture: Irregular/uneven
- Tenacity: Brittle
- Mohs scale hardness: 7.5
- Luster: Adamantine
- Streak: White
- Diaphaneity: Translucent
- Specific gravity: 5.16
- Optical properties: Uniaxial (+)
- Refractive index: n_{ω}=1.64, n_{ε}=1.655
- Birefringence: 0.0150
- Pleochroism: None

Reidite is a rare polymorph of ZrSiO_{4} created when zircon experiences high pressure and temperature. Reidite is denser than zircon and has the same crystal structure as scheelite. All natural occurrences of reidite are associated with meteorite impact events.

On Earth, reidite has been reported from ten impact structures: the Chesapeake Bay Crater in Virginia; Ries Crater in Germany; Xiuyan Crater in China; Woodleigh Crater in Western Australia; Rock Elm Crater in Wisconsin; Dhala Crater in India; Stac Fada in Scotland; Haughton in Canada; Steen River in Canada, and Rochechouart in France. Reidite has also been found in one lunar meteorite.

== Name origin and discovery ==
Reidite is named after Alan F. Reid, the scientist who first synthesized it during high-pressure experiments in the laboratory in 1969.

Reidite was first discovered in natural samples by B.P. Glass and Shaobin Liu in 2001.

== Occurrence ==
Reidite is formed from zircon above ~30GPa in shock recovery experiments. However, the temperatures generated during meteorite impacts are much higher, and reidite can be formed down to ~9GPa under natural impact conditions. Reidite has been found in lamellar, granular, and dendritic forms within host zircon, typically making up less than 10% of the grain. Reidite from Rochechouart impact structure has also been reported as bladed, wedged, and massive.

Libyan desert glass may show lattice deformation in zircon that is interpreted as evidence of this material having previously contained reidite, and as such constitutes strong evidence for its impact origin.

== Related silica minerals ==
Relationship of Reidite to Other Specimens
9.AD.25	Uvarovite	Ca_{3}Cr_{2}(SiO_{4})_{3}
9.AD.25	Wadalite	(Ca,Mg)_{6}(Al,Fe^{3+})_{4}((Si,Al)O_{4})_{3}O_{4}Cl_{3}
9.AD.25	Holtstamite	Ca_{3}(Al,Mn^{3+})_{2}(SiO_{4})_{2}(OH)_{4}
9.AD.25	Kerimasite	Ca_{3}Zr_{2}(SiO_{4})(Fe^{3+}O_{4})_{2}
9.AD.25	Toturite	Ca_{3}Sn_{2}(SiO_{4})(Fe^{3+}O_{4})_{2}
9.AD.25	Momoiite	(Mn^{2+},Ca)_{3}V_{2}^{3+}(SiO_{4})_{3}
9.AD.25	Eltyubyuite	Ca_{12}Fe_{10}^{3+}Si_{4}O_{32}Cl_{6}
9.AD.25	Hutcheonite	Ca_{3}Ti_{2}(SiAl_{2})O_{12}
9.AD.30	Coffinite	(U^{4+},Th)(SiO_{4})_{1-x}(OH)_{4x}
9.AD.30	Hafnon	HfSiO_{4}
9.AD.30	Thorite	(Th,U)SiO_{4}
9.AD.30	Zircon	ZrSiO_{4}
9.AD.30	Stetindite	Ce^{4+}SiO_{4}
9.AD.35	Huttonite	ThSiO_{4}
9.AD.35	Tombarthite-(Y)	Y_{4}(Si,H_{4})_{4}O_{12−x}(OH)_{4+2x}
9.AD.40	Eulytine	Bi_{4}(SiO_{4})_{3}

== See also ==
- List of minerals
