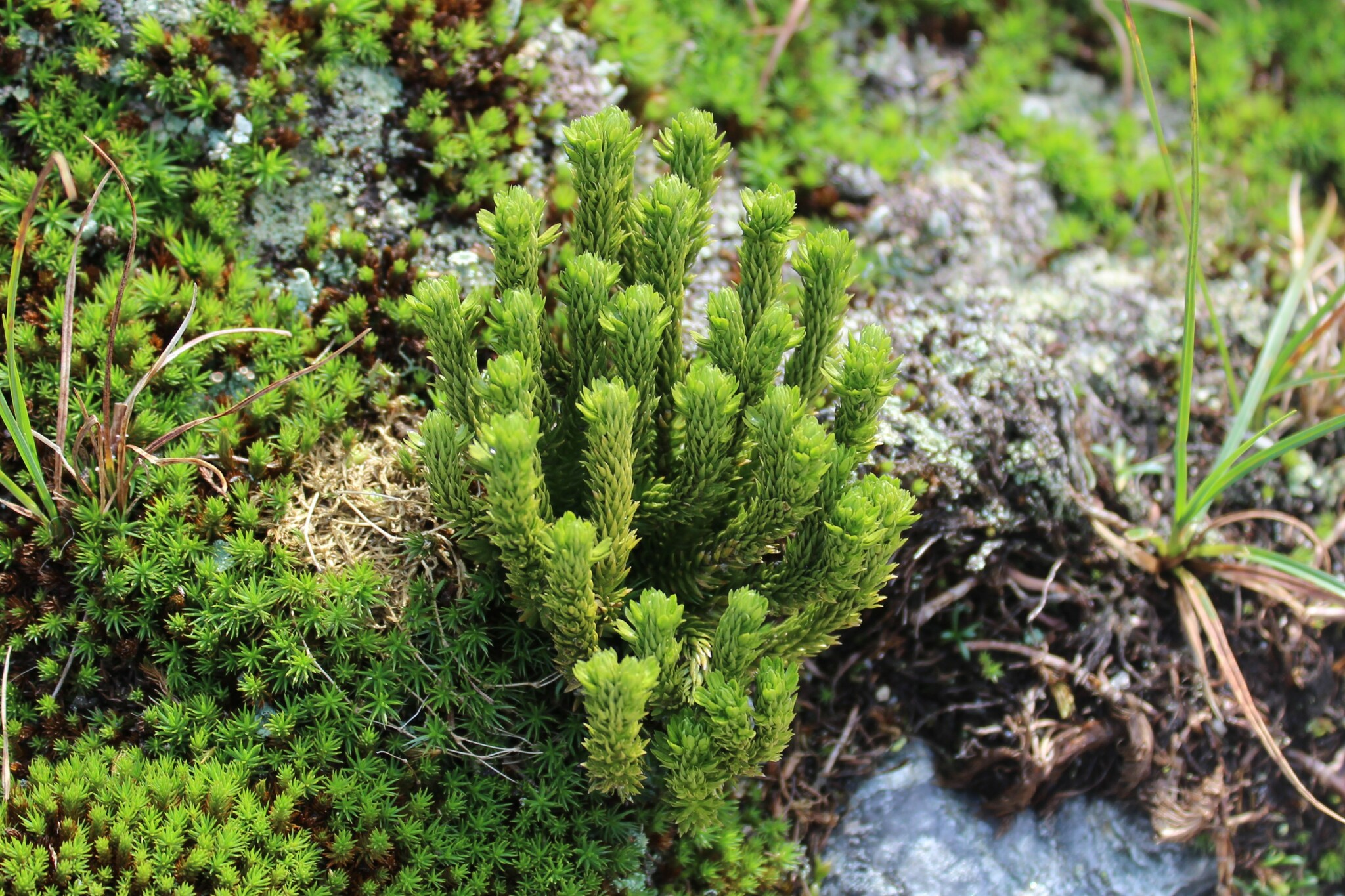

Scientific classification
- Kingdom: Plantae
- Clade: Tracheophytes
- Clade: Lycophytes
- Class: Lycopodiopsida
- Order: Lycopodiales
- Family: Lycopodiaceae
- Genus: Huperzia
- Species: H. appalachiana

Binomial name
- Huperzia appalachiana Beitel & Mickel

= Huperzia appalachiana =

Species of spore-bearing plant

Huperzia appalachiana is a species of clubmoss.

== Description ==
The original description is:

“Stems tufted to shortly decumbent (1 cm (0.39 in)), erect portions of stem 6–10 cm (2.4–3.9 in) tall. Stems appear to live for definite periods (about 10 years of spore production), then senesce and the entire plant dies. New stems produced by gemmae, which fall at base of older plant. Growth during juvenile period erect. Stems showing no annual constrictions. Mature portion of stem with markedly small leaves. Leaves ascending to spreading in juvenile portion, ascending to appressed in mature portion. Plants uniformly green to yellow-green. Adaxial leaf surfaces with large number of stomates (35-60 per half leaf). Leaf margin entire with occasional small papillae formed by marginal.”

== Distribution and habitat ==
Restricted to acidic rock at high elevations along the lower Appalachians, and to northern latitudes elsewhere, generally near the Canadian border in Vermont, Maine, and Michigan, and up into the Canadian Shield.

== Etymology ==
Appalachiana is the Latin adjectival form of Appalachia.
