= Ordovician meteor event =

Event of around 467 million years ago

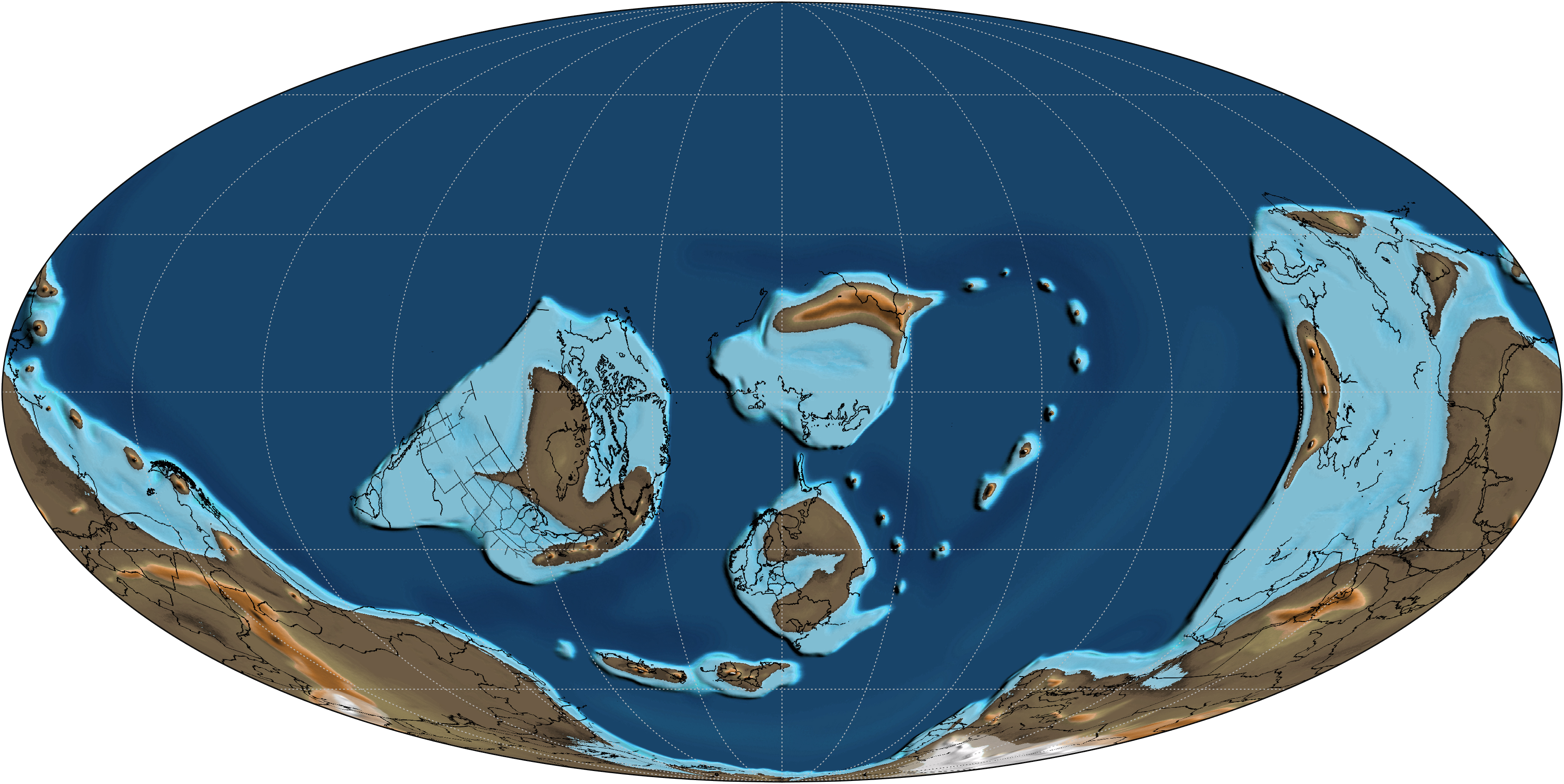
Paleogeography of Earth around the time of Ordovician meteor event (465 Ma)

The Ordovician meteor event was a dramatic increase in the rate at which L chondrite meteorites fell to Earth during the Middle Ordovician period, about 467.5±0.28 million years ago, lasting for about 40 million years. This rate increase is indicated by abundant fossil L chondrite meteorites in a quarry in Sweden and enhanced concentrations of ordinary chondritic chromite grains in sedimentary rocks from this time.

According to a 2019 study, this temporary increase in the impact rate could have been caused by the destruction of the L chondrite parent body that was 150 kilometers (93 mi) in diameter and orbited in the asteroid belt between Mars and Jupiter. This occurred around 468±0.3 million years ago, having scattered fragments into Earth-crossing orbits, a chronology which is also supported by shock ages in numerous L chondrite meteorites that fall to Earth today.

It has been speculated that this influx contributed to, or possibly even instigated, the Great Ordovician Biodiversification Event, although this has been questioned.

A 2024 study found that all of 21 studied craters from this event were at the time within 30° of the equator. Impactors directly from the asteroid belt would be expected to produce a random distribution of craters, so this suggests that the event may have been caused by an asteroid that passed within Earth's Roche limit and broke up into a ring system, material from which then deorbited and formed the craters. It is also speculated that the shading of Earth by this ring may have contributed to the Hirnantian glaciation.

== Possible craters ==
Locations of possible craters related to the event

== See also ==
- Österplana 065
- Late Ordovician impact craters
  - Lockne crater
  - Målingen crater
  - Pilot crater
  - Tvären
