= Wisconsin Highway 128 =

State highway in Wisconsin, United States

State Trunk Highway 128
- WIS 128 highlighted in red

Route information
- Maintained by WisDOT
- Length: 27.04 mi (43.52 km)

Major junctions
- South end: WIS 72 in Elmwood
- I-94 in Wilson; US 12 in Wilson
- North end: WIS 64 in Forest

Location
- Country: United States
- State: Wisconsin
- Counties: Pierce, St. Croix

Highway system
- Wisconsin State Trunk Highway System; Interstate; US; State; Scenic; Rustic
← WIS 127	→ WIS 129

State Trunk Highway 128 (often called Highway 128, STH-128 or WIS 128) is a 27.04 miles (43.52 km) state highway in Pierce and St. Croix counties in Wisconsin, United States. It runs in north–south in northwest Wisconsin from near Elmwood to Forest.

== Route description ==
The highway begins at an intersection with WIS 72 and runs north from it, following the Eau Galle River until its intersection with County Trunk Highway B (CTH-B), from which it continues north. It passes through intersections with WIS 29 and CTH-N and an interchange with Interstate 94 (I-94) before intersecting with US Highway 12 (US 12) near Hersey and Wilson. It then continues north before curving eastward to meet WIS 170 in Glenwood City. From there it runs north until it terminates at WIS 64.

== History ==
Initially, in 1923, WIS 128 was established roughly along part of its present-day route and present-day CTH-B from WIS 51 (now WIS 72) in Elmwood to WIS 116 (now WIS 29) in Spring Valley. Then, in 1934, WIS 128 extended northward to WIS 79 in Glenwood, superseding CTH-A in the process. In 1947, WIS 79 moved off from Glenwood and instead served Connorsville. As a result, WIS 170 extended westward towards Glenwood while WIS 128 extended northward towards WIS 64. By 1994, WIS 128 moved eastward onto the existing bypass of Spring Valley, superseding CTH-T. As a result, CTH-B was established to follow along part of the former alignment.

== Major intersections ==
County	Location	mi	km	Destinations	Notes
Pierce	Elmwood–Spring Lake line	0.0	0.0	WIS 72 – Ellsworth, Downsville	
St. Croix	Cady	7.2	11.6	WIS 29 – Spring Valley, Menomonie	
St. Croix	Cady	11.5	18.5	I-94 – Hudson, Menomonie	Interchange
St. Croix	Springfield	13.0	20.9	US 12 – Woodville, Wilson	
St. Croix	Glenwood City	20.9	33.6	WIS 170 east – Downing, Boyceville	
St. Croix	Forest	27.1	43.6	WIS 64 – New Richmond, Connorsville CTH-P north	
1.000 mi = 1.609 km; 1.000 km = 0.621 mi: Concurrency terminus
