= Wisconsin Highway 72 =

State highway in Wisconsin, United States

State Trunk Highway 72
- WIS 72 highlighted in red

Route information
- Maintained by WisDOT
- Length: 29.44 mi (47.38 km)

Major junctions
- West end: US 10 / US 63 in Ellsworth
- US 63 in Ellsworth
- East end: WIS 25 in Downsville

Location
- Country: United States
- State: Wisconsin
- Counties: Pierce, Dunn

Highway system
- Wisconsin State Trunk Highway System; Interstate; US; State; Scenic; Rustic
| ← WIS 71 | → WIS 73 |

State Trunk Highway 72 (often called Highway 72, STH-72 or WIS 72) is a 29.44-mile (47.38 km) state highway state highway in Pierce and Dunn counties in Wisconsin, United States. It runs in west central Wisconsin from US Highway 10 (US 10) and US 63 east of Ellsworth east to WIS 25 in Downsville. The road is maintained by the Wisconsin Department of Transportation (WisDOT).

== Route description ==
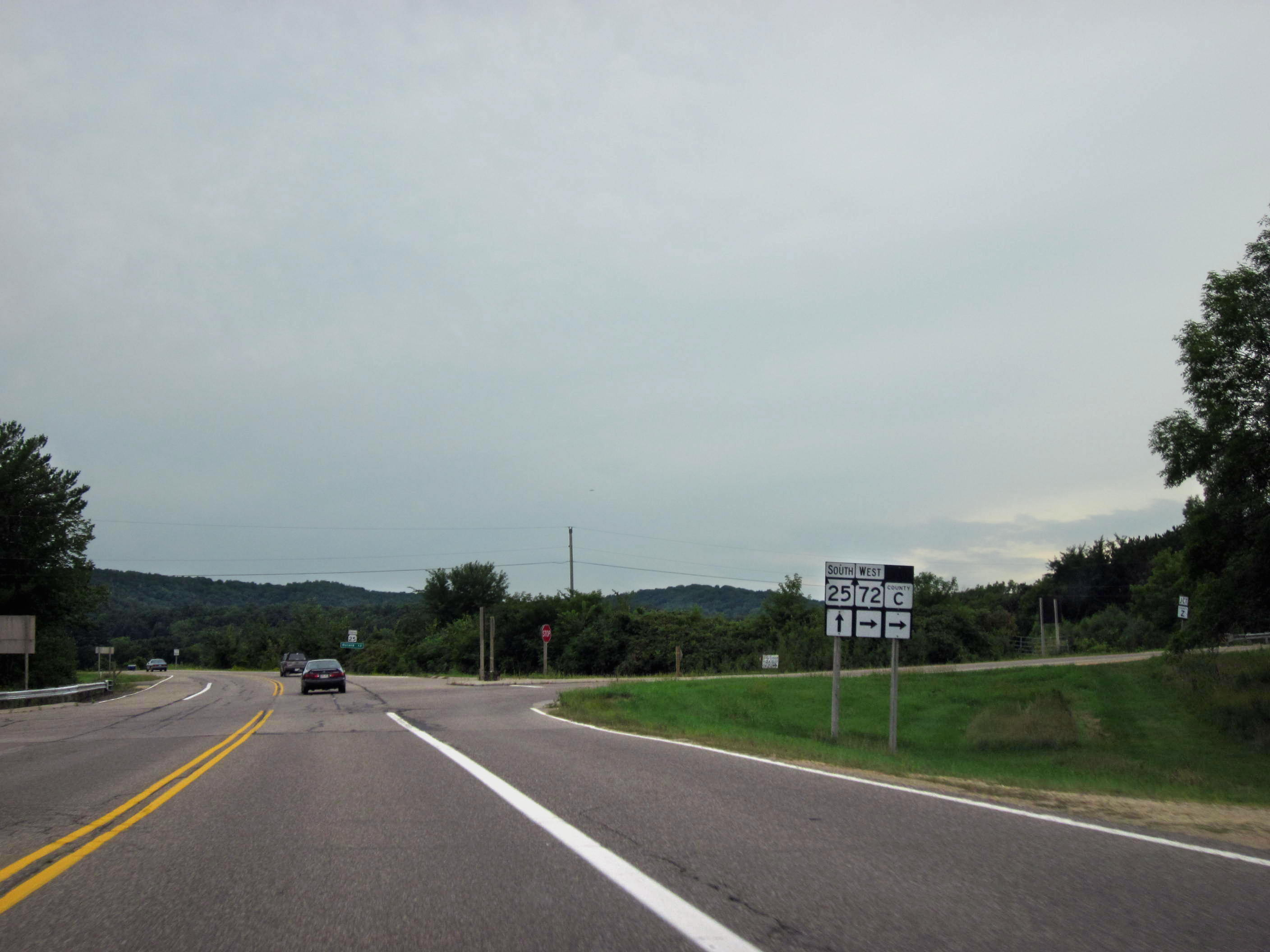
Eastern terminus of WIS 72 in Downsville

WIS 72 begins at an intersection with US 10 and US 63 in the Town of Ellsworth in Pierce County, east of the village of the same name. From here, the highway heads east running concurrently with US 63. The roads pass through a rural area together until US 63 splits off to the north. WIS 72 continues eastward, intersecting County Trunk Highway DD (CTH-DD) before entering the Town of El Paso. After crossing the Rush River, the highway briefly follows the river's edge before continuing eastward. The road passes through the communities of Waverly and Rock Elm, then turns northeast toward Elmwood. In Elmwood, the highway intersects WIS 128 at that route's southern terminus, then turns east and leaves the village. Past Elmwood, WIS 72 then enters the Town of Weston in Dunn County. The road heads east through farmland, crossing the Eau Galle River after meeting CTH-C for the first time. It then intersects CTH-D and CTH-K before entering the Town of Dunn. The highway curves to the southeast before terminating at an intersection with WIS 25 and CTH-C in Downsville. The Red Cedar River lies immediately to the east of the terminus.

== Major intersections ==
| County | Location | mi | km | Destinations | Notes |
|---|---|---|---|---|---|
| Pierce | Town of Ellsworth | 0.0 | 0.0 | US 10 / US 63 south – Ellsworth, Durand | Western end of US 63 concurrency |
| Pierce | Town of Ellsworth | 1.7 | 2.7 | US 63 north – Baldwin | Eastern end of US 63 concurrency |
| Pierce | Elmwood | 17.7 | 28.5 | WIS 128 north – Spring Valley | |
| Dunn | Downsville | 29.3 | 47.2 | WIS 25 – Menomonie, Durand | |
1.000 mi = 1.609 km; 1.000 km = 0.621 mi: Concurrency terminus
