= Waverly, Wisconsin =

- Unincorporated community
- Location within Wisconsin Location within the United States
- Coordinates: 44°43′43″N 92°15′25″W
- Country: United States
- State: Wisconsin
- County: Pierce
- Elevation: 1,099 ft (335 m)
- Time zone: UTC-6 (Central (CST))
  - Summer (DST): UTC-5 (CDT)
- Area codes: 715 & 534
- GNIS feature ID: 1576339

Waverly is an unincorporated community located in the towns of El Paso and Rock Elm, Pierce County, Wisconsin, United States. Waverly is located at the junction of Wisconsin Highway 72 and County Highway CC, 11 miles (18 km) east of Ellsworth.
