= Rustic Road (Wisconsin) =

Highway system in Wisconsin, United States

Rustic Roads
- Standard Rustic Road marker

Highway names
- Interstates: Interstate X (I-X)
- US Highways: U.S. Highway X (US X)
- State: (State Trunk) Highway X (STH-X or WIS X)
- County Highway: (County Trunk) Highway X (CTH-X)
- Rustic Road: Rustic Road X (RX)

System links
- Wisconsin State Trunk Highway System; Interstate; US; State; Scenic; Rustic

The Rustic Road system is a system of scenic roads in the US state of Wisconsin. They differ from the main trunkline highway system in that they are not meant to be major through routes, but lightly traveled local access, and are to meet minimum standards for natural features. Rustic roads have lower speed limits than those on other highway systems. Each route is marked by brown and yellow signs, with the route number on a small placard below the sign. The letter "R" prefix is followed by the number designation. Wisconsin is the only state to have a system of rustic roads. Wisconsin has a separate system of scenic byways following the development of a national system in the 1990s.

== System description ==
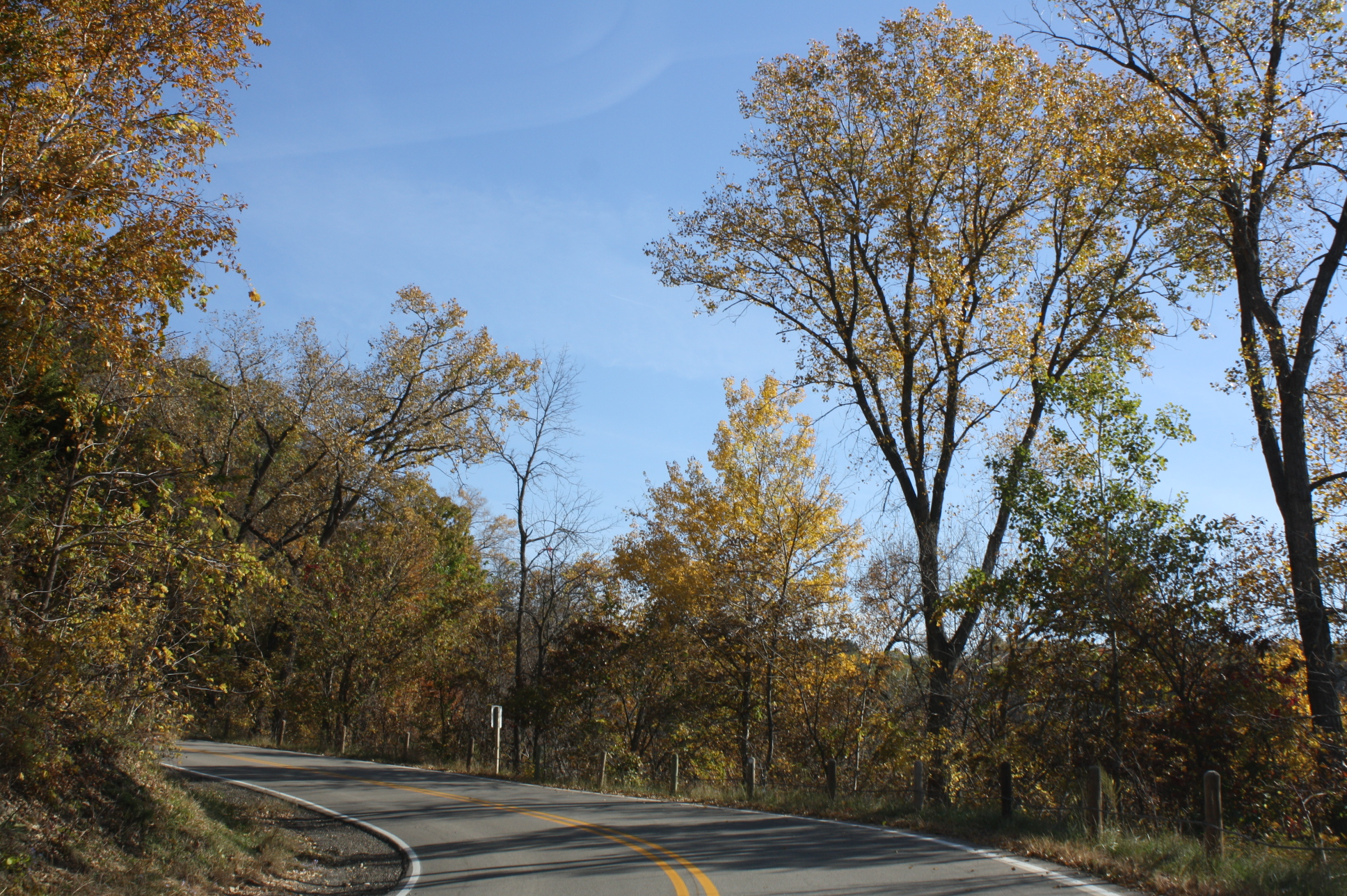
Rustic Road 26 in autumn

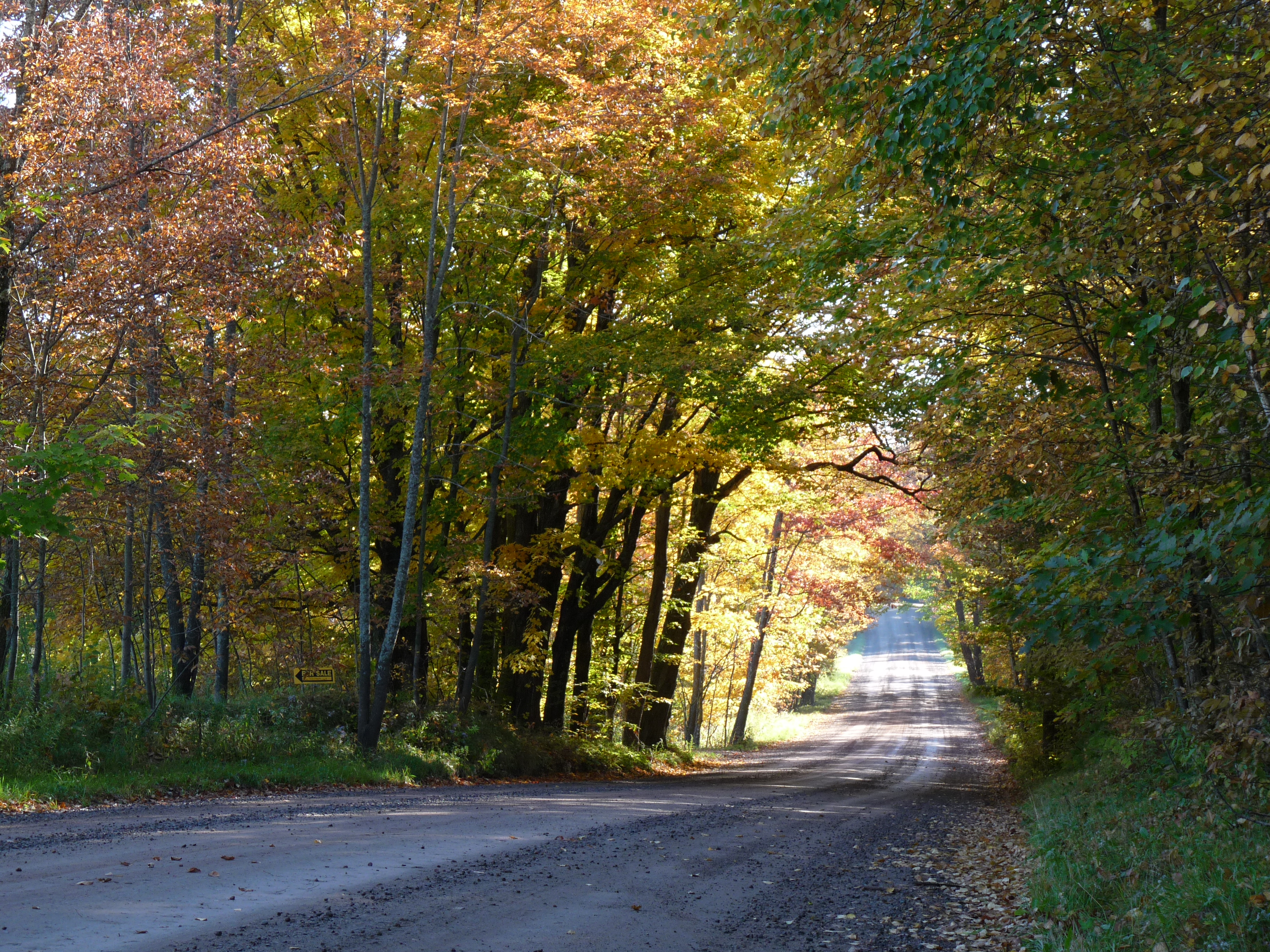
Rustic Road 1, north of Medford

The Rustic Road concept was conceived in 1973. The Wisconsin State Legislature established the program to help preserve lightly traveled scenic rural roads. There are a few requirements that a road must have in order to be designated as a rustic road, such as having outstanding natural features or areas that set the road apart from other roads, be a lightly traveled road, not be scheduled for a major improvement which would change its rustic characteristics, and preferably be at least two miles (3.2 km) with a loop, completed closure, or connection to a major highway at both ends of the route. The maximum speed limit established by law is 45 miles per hour (72 km/h), but can be set lower by a local government if desired. Rustic roads may be dirt, gravel, or paved. They can be one- or two-way and can have accommodations for bicycles and hiking adjacent to or incorporated into the road or surrounding area. The designation process is initiated by application for designation by a local government.

== History ==
The effort to identify rustic roads began in order to help local government and citizens preserve Wisconsin's scenic routes. The Rustic Roads system was established by the 1973 Wisconsin State Legislature. The law created the Wisconsin Rustic Roads Board. The first road was designated in 1975 in Taylor County in the Town of Rib Lake. The application requires the reasons why a road should be designated, photographs, and a resolution of support from the local government. A 10-member volunteer board develops the rules and standards for the roads, and enacts the final approval for each designation. Before approving, two members of the board separately drive and personally assess the proposed route. As of 2026, the system has 126 Rustic Roads for a total length of 760 miles (1,220 km) in 61 of the state's 72 counties. At that time, the roads varied in length from 2 to 37 miles (3.2 to 59.5 km).

== List ==
Number	Length (mi)	Length (km)	Southern or western terminus	Northern or eastern terminus	Counties	Formed	Removed	Notes
R1	5.0	8.0	CTH-D in Town of Rib Lake	WIS 102 in Town of Rib Lake	Taylor	1975	current	Unpaved
R2	7.9	12.7	Center and Grove Streets in Burlington	WIS 83 in Waterford	Racine	—	—	Paved; three segments along Honey Lake and Maple roads, Heritage Road and Maple Road, connected by CTH-FF and CTH-D
R3	3.6	5.8	CTH-E in Springfield	WIS 128 in Glenwood	St. Croix	—	—	Paved
R4	4.6	7.4	CTH-W in Springfield	WIS 128 in Glenwood	St. Croix	—	—	Unpaved; has a spur to CTH-W
R5	3.1	5.0	WIS 164 in Waterford	WIS 36 in Wind Lake	Racine	—	—	Paved; follows Loomis Road and Fries Lane
R6	13.3	21.4	WIS 64 in Cleveland	CTH-E at Rusk County line	Chippewa	—	—	Paved; follows CTH-E
R7	3.5	5.6	CTH-AB in Franklin–Montpelier	WIS 29 in Montpelier	Kewaunee	—	—	Paved; follows Pine Grove, Sleepy Hollow, Cherneyville and Hrabik roads
R8	3.0	4.8	Loop including CTH-IR, Sunrise Road, Pine Lane, and Westview Road in Suamico		Brown	—	—	Paved; loop route
R9	6.7	10.8	CTH-T & Brauer Road in Sevastopol–Sturgeon Bay	CTH-T & Whitefish Bay Road in Sevastopol	Door	—	—	Paved; follows CTH-T
R10	2.5	4.0	Main Street in Summit	CTH-P in Summit	Waukesha	—	—	Paved; follows Mill Road and CTH-B; Main Street connects to R-115
R11	10.3	16.6	WIS 50 in Lyons	R-11 (South Road) in Lyons	Walworth	—	—	Paved; loop route along South, Spring Valley, Knob and Steele roads; Spring Valley Road connects to R-12, and Steele Road intersects R-36
R12	5.7	9.2	WIS 50 in Lyons	WIS 36 in Lyons	Walworth	—	—	Paved; follows Black, Spring Valley and Sheridan Springs roads and Church Street; Spring Valley Road connects to R-11
R13	3.0	4.8	Baer Drive in Town of Hudson	River Road in St. Joseph	St. Croix	—	—	Paved; follows Trout Brook Road
R14	2.0	3.2	CTH-A in Easton	CTH-B in New Chester–Easton	Adams	—	—	Unpaved; follows Ember Drive
R15	5.4	8.7	Fish Lake Road in Town of Grantsburg	Hickerson Road in Town of Grantsburg	Burnett	—	—	Paved; follows West River and Skog roads
R16	5.2	8.4	CTH-O at city limits of Two Rivers	CTH-V in Two Rivers	Manitowoc	—	—	Paved; follows CTH-O through Point Beach State Forest
R17	2.7	4.3	CTH-T in Lanark	US 10 in Lanark	Portage	—	—	Paved; follows Morgan and Otto roads
R18	6.8	10.9	CTH-M & 18th Avenue CTH-M & 25th Street	CTH-M & 15 3/4 Avenue CTH-M & 17 1/4 Avenue	Barron	—	—	Paved; two segments with CTH-M as a connecting highway; follows 23rd Street and 15 3/4 Avenue plus 25th Street and 17 1/4 Avenue
R19	2.3	3.7	CTH-B in Dunn	Goodland Park Road in Dunn	Dane	—	—	Paved; follows Lalor Road next to the Waubesa Wetlands State Natural Area
R20	2.9	4.7	Schneider Road in McFarland	CTH-AB in Stoughton	Dane	—	—	Paved; follows Dreyson Road
R21	8.6	13.8	—	—	Sauk	—	—	Paved and unpaved; follows Slotty Road and Orchard Drive with spurs along Schara Drive and Ruff Road
R22	5.5	8.9	CTH-D in Neshkoro	Big Island Road in Neshkoro	Green Lake	—	—	Paved and unpaved portions; follows White River Road through the White River Marsh State Wilderness Area
R23	3.6	5.8	Hartman Creek Road in Hartman Creek State Park	CTH-QQ in Rural	Waupaca	—	—	Paved; follows Rural Road
R24	2.7	4.3	Emmons Creek Road at Portage County line	R-23 (Rural Road) near Rural	Waupaca	—	—	Paved and unpaved; follows Emmons Creek Road
R25	2.6	4.2	CTH-DD	CTH-D	Racine	—	—	Paved; follows Oak Knoll Road; connects to R-2 via CTH-D (Washington Avenue)
R26	5.3	8.5	US 14/US 61 in La Crosse	US 14/US 61 east of La Crosse	La Crosse	—	—	Paved; follows CTH-MM
R27	4.3	6.9	CTH-F	CTH-F	Green	—	—	Paved; follows Park Road
R28	5.2	8.4	CTH-H	CTH-D south of Range	Polk	—	—	Paved and unpaved; follows Mains Crossing (Old US 8
R29	2.7	4.3	WIS 50 in Town of Geneva	WIS 50 in Lake Geneva	Walworth	—	—	Paved; follows Snake Road
R30	2.3	3.7	CTH-K	WIS 36	Racine	—	—	Paved; follows Hillcrest, Hanson, Division and Malchine roads
R31	2.6	4.2	I-90 in West Salem WIS 16 at Swarthout Lakeside Park	WIS 16 in West Salem WIS 16 at Swarthout Lakeside Park	La Crosse	—	—	Paved; southern section follows village streets and CTH-C in West Salem; northern section loops around Swarthout Lakeside Park
R32	37.1	59.7	CTH-W CTH-C	CTH-C US 8	Marinette	—	—	Paved and unpaved; souther segment follows Parkway Road; northern segment follows CTH-I; branch from northern segment follows Goodman Park Road to Benson Lake Road
R33	12.1	19.5	CTH-Q at the Waukesha County line	WIS 167 & CTH-CC	Washington	—	—	Paved; follows Monches and St. Augustine roads with branches along Emerald Drive, Shamrock Lane and Donegal Road to CTH-K
R34	8.8	14.2	WIS 70	WIS 55 on Alvin	Forest	—	—	Paved and unpaved; follows Fisher and Cary Dam roads and Lakeview Drive
R35	2.7	4.3	John Paul Road in Milton	CTH-N	Rock	—	—	Paved; follows Sterns Road
R36	3.6	5.8	WIS 50	45th Road at Kenosha County line	Walworth County	—	—	Paved; follows Cranberry Road with a branch along Berndt Road to R-11
R37	1.8	2.9	108th Street	CTH-U (80th Street)	Racine	—	—	Paved; follows Three Mile Road
R38	2.5	4.0	CTH-Q	Cana Island	Door	—	—	Paved; follows Cana Island Road
R39	2.5	4.0	WIS 57	Point Drive	Door	—	—	Paved; follows Ridges Road
R40	4.6	7.4	CHT-J	CTH-FF	Brown	—	—	Paved; follows Trout Creek Drive, North Pine Tree Road, Centennial Centre Boulevard, Forest Road and Hill Drive
R41	2.3	3.7	70th & CTH-G	CTH-E	Polk	—	—	Paved and gravel sections; follows Clara Lake Drive
R42	5.7	9.2	CTH-JB southeast of Burlington	WIS 142 east of Burlington	Racine	—	—	Paved; follows Hoosier Creek Road, but discontinuous across the railroad tracks; branches to CTH-JB along Wheatland Road and to WIS 142 along Brever Road
R43	3.7	6.0	WIS 142	WIS 11	Kenosha, Racine	—	—	Paved; follows CTH-B
R44	6.5	10.5	Panske Road	CTH-X	Marinette	—	—	Paved; follows Right-of-Way Road with a branch to Sumac Lane
R45	2.7	4.3	Coon Fork Lake	CTH-H	Eau Claire	—	—	Unpaved; follows Goat Ranch Road
R46	1.3	2.1	WIS 32/WIS 57 in DePere	WIS 32/WIS 57 in DePere	Brown	—	—	Paved; follows Old Plank Road
R47	14.0	22.5	US 45 in Tigerton	CTH-Q in Wittenberg	Shawano	—	—	Paved, follows CTH-M
R48	2.1	3.4	CTH-H southeast of Saxeville	CTH-W & R-117 south of Saxeville	Waushara	—	—	Paved; follows 26th Road
R49	9.8	15.8	CTH-T in Sauk County	WIS 33 in Portage	Sauk, Columbia	—	—	Paved; follows Levee Road
R50	4.6	7.4	8th Drive	4th Avenue	Adams	—	—	Unpaved; follows Cottonville Avenue (Old State Road)
R51	4.3	6.9	CTH-AA southeast of Maiden Rock	CTH-CC	Pierce	—	—	Unpaved, closed in winter; follows 20th Avenue, 197th Street, and 50th Avenue
R52	6.7	10.8	CTH-Y at county line	Knollwood Drive at county line	Washington, Ozaukee	—	—	Paved and unpaved; follows Paradise and Washington drives plus Wausaukee, St. Augustine, Blue Goose and Knollwood roads; branch along Paradise Drive connects to CTH-M
R53	4.1	6.6	I-41/US 41 frontage road west of Wrightstown	I-41/US 41 frontage road at Wrightstown	Outagamie	—	—	Paved; follows Bodde, Greiner, McCabe, and Garrity roads
R54	12.3	19.8	CTH-O	WIS 54	Jackson	—	—	Paved; follows North Settlement Road through Black River State Forest
R55	2.8	4.5	CTH-SS	WIS 131 southeast of LaFarge	Vernon	—	—	Paved and unpaved; follows Tunnelville Road
R56	8.6	13.8	WIS 131 south of Ontario	WIS 131 in Ontario	Vernon	—	—	Paved; follows Dutch Hollow, Sand Hill, Hoff Valley and Lower Ridge roads
R57	4.1	6.6	WIS 54	US 10	Waupaca	—	—	Paved; follows Town Line and Foley roads; follows the Ice Age National Scenic Trail
R58	9.6	15.4	WIS 70	US 51	Oneida	—	—	Paved; follows Blue Lake and Mercer Lake roads
R59	4.5	7.2	R-58 (Blue Lake Road)	WIS 70	Oneida	—	—	Unpaved and paved; follows Sutton and Camp Pinemere roads
R60	11.7	18.8	CTH-M	CTH-N	Vilas	—	—	Paved; follows CTH-K
R61	3.3	5.3	CTH-M in Hortonville	WIS 76 near Stephensville	Outagamie	—	—	Paved; follows CTH-MM
R62	2.0	3.2	CHT-C	WIS 86	Price	—	—	Paved; follows CTH-RR
R63	2.4	3.9	WIS 23 south of Glenbeulah	CTH-S in Glenbeulah	Sheboygan	—	—	Paved and unpaved; follows CHT-S
R64	2.7	4.3	US 53/WIS 93	US 53/WIS 93	La Crosse	—	—	Paved; follows Old 93 and Amsterdam Prairie roads
R65	2.0	3.2	Granville Road	WIS 181	Ozaukee	—	—	Paved and unpaved; follows Hawthorne Road
R66	7.5	12.1	Buncombe Road at Grant County line	CTH-W	Lafayette	—	—	Paved; follows sections of Buncombe, Kennedy, Beebe and Ensche roads branching out in different directions to CTH-W and the Illinois state line
R67	4.6	7.4	US 8/US 63 in Turtle Lake	US 63 north of Turtle Lake	Barron, Polk	—	—	Paved and unpaved; follows Pine Street, West Town Line Road, Barron–Polk Street and 16th Avenue
R68	5.7	9.2	US 14	Stebbinsville Road at Dane County line	Rock	—	—	Paved; follows Riley Road
R69	0.75	1.21	East Albert Street	End of Old Agency House Road	Columbia	—	—	Paved; follows Old Agency House Road
R70	10.1	16.3	US 61 southwest of Stitzer	CTH-E in Stitzer	Grant	1995	current	Paved and unpaved; follows Liberty Ridge Road with a branch along Hill, Ridge, Sleepy Hollow and Scenic roads
R71	2.2	3.5	WIS 70 southwest of Stone Lake	CTH-A	Washburn	—	—	Paved; follows Lake and Little Stone roads
R72	3.1	5.0	CTH-M	CTH-M	Winnebago	—	—	Paved and unpaved; follows Mountain Road
R73	2.5	4.0	CTH-P south of Atwood	CTH-N east of Atwood	Clark	—	—	Unpaved; follows Cloverdale Road and Robin Avenue
R74	32.5	52.3	WIS 139	WIS 101 & CTH-C	Florence	—	—	Paved and unpaved; follows Morgan Lake Road with a loop along Twin Rivers, Newald, Newald Tower and Rock Creek roads
R75	3.7	6.0	CTH-G south of Rewey	CTH-A east of Rewey	Iowa	—	—	Paved; follows Turnbull, Bromley and Ogden roads
R76	9.0	14.5	CTH-B in Town of Hewett	US 10 in Twon of Hewett	Clark	—	—	Unpaved; follows Bruce Mound Avenue, Sand Road, Fisher Avenue, Middle Road and Columbia Avenue; branch along Fisher Avenue connects to Poertner Road
R77	3.5	5.6	CTH-TT	CTH-TT	Door	—	—	Paved; follows Lake Forest Park Drive along CTH-TT
R78	4.0	6.4	CTH-E	CTH-E	Lincoln	—	—	Paved and unpaved; follows Tesch Road
R79	1.2	1.9	CTH-F	WIS 35	Burnett	—	—	Paved; follows Glendenning Road
R80	2.1	3.4	CTH-A	Tokash Road	Burnett	—	—	Paved; follows CTH-E
R81	2.9	4.7	WIS 39 near New Glarus	CTH-H near New Glarus	Green	—	—	Paved; follows Marty Road
R82	9.4	15.1	WIS 67 west of Campbellsport	WIS 67 west of Campbellsport	Fond du Lac	—	—	Paved; follows Katzenburg, Cloverland, Rolling, Spring and River drives with branches connecting between WIS 67 and CTH-W
R83	4.6	7.4	CTH-V southwest of Haugen	30th Avenue at Washburn County line	Barron	—	—	Unpaved; follows 13 3/4-16th Street (Narrow Gauge Road)
R84	2.2	3.5	Rock River Road near Fort Atkinson	CTH-N near Fort Atkinson	Jefferson	—	—	Paved; follows Bark River Road
R85	2.5	4.0	CTH-DD near Burlington	CTH-DD near Burlington	Walworth	—	—	Paved; loop route along Potter and Kearney roads
R86	7.3	11.7	WIS 59 in North Prairie	US 18 & R-115 near Dousman	Waukesha	—	—	Paved; follows sections of Piper Road, CTH-ZZ and Waterville Road
R87	6.7	10.8	WIS 26 near Fort Atkinson	US 12 near Fort Atkinson	Jefferson	—	—	Paved; follows Pond, Poeppel, McIntyre and Creamery roads
R88	3.5	5.6	Main Street in Whitewater	Carnes Road	Walworth, Jefferson	—	—	Paved; follows Cold Spring Road
R89	4.7	7.6	370th Avenue	CTH-P in Menomonie	Dunn	—	—	Paved; follows 410th and 420th streets and CTH-D
R90	3.2	5.1	CTH-OK	CTH-G	Green	—	—	Unpaved; follows Preston, Mill, and Kaderly roads
R91	5.0	8.0	WIS 54	WIS 54	Trempealeau	—	—	Paved and unpaved; follows River Drive
R92	4.1	6.6	WIS 29/WIS 35 & CTH-FF south of River Falls	CTH-O	Pierce	—	—	Paved; follows Happy Valley Road
R93	2.8	4.5	145th Street in Luck	CTH-GG east of Luck	Polk	—	—	Unpaved; follows Chippewa Trail
R94	4.6	7.4	WIS 81	CTH-J	Green	—	—	Paved; follows Skinner Hollow Road
R95	16.4	26.4	WIS 77 in Town of Spider Lake	CTH-M in Town of Namakagon	Sawyer, Bayfield	—	—	Unpaved and paved; follows FR-203 and Lake Land Lake Road with a loop on FR-622 and FR-206
R96	3.6	5.8	CTH-N near Cottage Grove	Jargo Road near Cottage Grove	Dane	—	—	Paved; follows Nora Road
R97	5.0	8.0	CTH-X near Middle Inlet	CTH-C	Marinette	—	—	Paved and unpaved; follows Sweetheart City and Creek roads
R98	8.0	12.9	WIS 35 in Town of Oakland	WIS 35 in Town of Oakland	Burnett	—	—	Paved; follows Old 35, CCC, and Hayden Lake roads; crosses into Town of Swiss
R99	3.4	5.5	WIS 133 in Potosi	WIS 33 in Potosi	Grant	—	—	Paved; follows River Lane, Slazing and Brewery Hollow roads along a section of the Mississippi River
R100	13.5	21.7	CTH-J near Mercer	CR 519 at Michigan state line	Iron	—	—	Paved; follows CTH-H and CTH-G
R101	4.3	6.9	WIS 35 in Osceola	WIS 35 in Dresser	Polk	—	—	Paved; follows CTH-S
R102	2.2	3.5	WIS 21 & CTH-GG	WIS 21 & 9th Avenue	Waushara	—	—	Paved and unpaved; follows 7th Drive and Cumberland Avenue
R103	2.8	4.5	40th Street & 230th Avenue	Polk–St. Croix Road & 280th Street	Polk, Sawyer	—	—	Paved and unpaved; follows 230th Avenue, Marine Road, County Line Avenue and Polk–St. Croix Road
R104	2.8	4.5	CTH-CM on Columbia–Marquette county line	CTH-O	Columbia, Marquette	—	—	Paved; follows Barry and 14th roads
R105	13.0	20.9	WIS 70 & FR-148	WIS 70 & FR-144	Price	—	—	Paved and unpaved; follows FR-148 (Smith Rapids Road) and FR-144 (Shady Knoll Road); branches along FR-535 (Lodging Dam Road, Boat Landing Road)
R106	7.2	11.6	CTH-Z in Town of Leroy	Center Line Road in Town of Leroy	Dodge	—	—	Paved and unpaved; follows Ledge, North Point, South Point and West Point roads; several branches all south of WIS 49
R107	6.7	10.8	CTH-M in Town of Peru	CTH-O in Town of Peru	Dunn	—	—	Paved and unpaved; follows 50th Avenue, 650th Street and 160th Avenue
R108	3.4	5.5	CTH-OO in Town of Lenroot	CTH-OO in Town of Lenroot	Sawyer	—	—	Paved and unpaved; follows Northern Lights, Bedecked and Janet roads; crosses into Town of Spider Lake
R109	2.3	3.7	CTH-S in Oconto	Maple Grove School Road	Oconto	—	—	Paved; follows North Park Avenue Road
R110	5.9	9.5	WIS 60 (Lower Wisconsin River Road)	WIS 11 near Lodi	Columbia	—	—	Paved; follows O'Connor, Van Ness and Chrislaw roads
R111	25.5	41.0	WIS 77 & CTH-S	CTH-GG	Sawyer, Ashland	—	—	Paved and unpaved; follows CTH-S, Moose Lake Road and FR-164 with a branch along FR-174
R112	2.8	4.5	CTH-G	Dutch Hollow Road	Sauk	—	—	Paved; follows Bundy Hollow Road
R113	9.4	15.1	CTH-W in Mountain	CTH-F	Oconto	—	—	Paved; follows Old 32 Road
R114	13.1	21.1	CTH-F	CHT-O	Rusk	—	—	Unpaved; follows North Buck's Lake, Perch Lake and Firelane roads with a branch along South Buck's Lake Road
R115	2.9	4.7	US 18 & R-86 in Summit	CTH-DR in Summit	Waukesha	—	—	Paved; follows Waterville Road; CTH-DR connects to R-10; roadway continues south as R-86
R116	2.2	3.5	CTH-A in Boardman	120th St in Town of Richmond	St. Croix	—	—	Paved; follows 140th Avenue
R117	1.8	2.9	CTH-A near Saxeville	CTH-W & R-48 (26th Road) near Saxeville	Waushara	—	—	Paved and unpaved; follows Portage Road, Portage Street and CTH-W plus a spur along Covered Bridge Road
R118	26.3	42.3	WIS 32 in Waubeno	R-118 (CTH-C)	Forest	—	—	Paved and unpaved; follows Indian Market, Kuffner, Camp 1 and Bay Shore roads forming a loop
R119	27.0	43.5	Loop around Washington Island		Door	—	—	Paved; follows CTH-W and shoreline roads on the island
R120	2.0	3.2	CTH-ES in Town of Lafayette	CTH-A in Town of Lafayette	Walworth	—	—	Paved; follows Peck Station Road
R121	2.9	4.7	WIS 80	CTH-S	Juneau	—	—	Paved; follows Lee Road
R122	2.7	4.3	CTH-D in Town of Waubeek	CTH-ZX in Town of Waterville	Pepin	—	—	Paved; follows Semple Road
R123	3.2	5.1	Fairview Road	Fairview Road	Winnebago	2022	current	Paved and unpaved; follows Medina Junction and Pioneer roads
R124	4.8	7.7	WIS 92 northwest of Mount Vernon	CTH-S northeast of Mount Horeb	Dane	2023	current	Paved; follows Town Hall Road
R125	9.4	15.1	CTH-OO and Clear Lake Road	CTH-M	Bayfield, Saywer	2024	current	Paved and unpaved; follows Telemark Road in Sawyer County and Spider Lake Fire Lane in Bayfield County
R126	3.6	5.8	WIS 20 near East Troy	WIS 20	Walworth	2024	current	Paved; follows Hillburn Mill and Bell School roads
