= Forest, Wisconsin =

Forest, Wisconsin is the name of some places in the U.S. state of Wisconsin:

- Forest County, Wisconsin
- Forest, Fond du Lac County, Wisconsin, a town
- Forest, Richland County, Wisconsin, a town
- Forest, St. Croix County, Wisconsin, a town
- Forest, Vernon County, Wisconsin, a town
- Forest (community), Wisconsin, an unincorporated community in St. Croix County
