= Rib Lake =

Rib Lake may refer to:

- Rib Lake, Wisconsin, village in Taylor County, Wisconsin, United States
- Rib Lake (town), Wisconsin, town in Taylor County, Wisconsin, United States
- Rib Lake (Ontario), lake in Northeastern Ontario, Canada
