= Ellsworth Cooperative Creamery =

Wisconsin Creamery

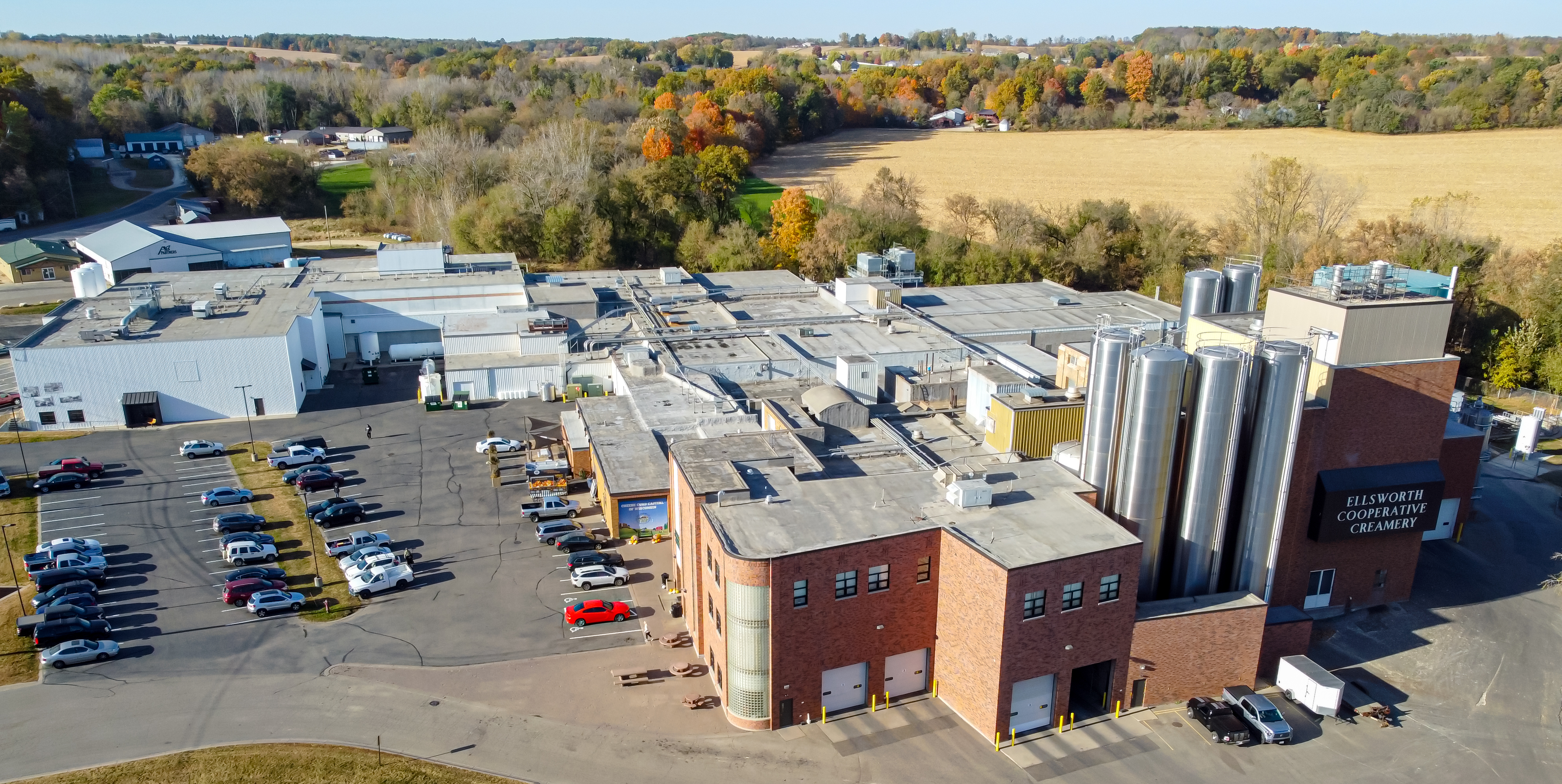
Ellsworth Cooperative Creamery

Ellsworth Cooperative Creamery is a producer of cheese curds located in Ellsworth, Wisconsin. It has retail locations in Ellsworth and Menomonie, Wi. The cooperative ships throughout the United States and Ellsworth Cheese Curds are found in grocery store chains in the upper Midwest. Ellsworth Cooperative Creamery is also a milk processing and whey drying plant.

== History ==
Ellsworth Cooperative Creamery is a farmer-owned dairy cooperative based in Ellsworth, Wisconsin, proudly known as the Cheese Curd Capital of Wisconsin. Its roots date back to 1903 when the Milton Dairy Company built a butter plant in East Ellsworth. In 1910, thirty local farmers formed the Ellsworth Butter and Cheese Company, marking the beginning of a cooperative that would go on to shape Wisconsin’s dairy heritage. Originally focused on butter production, Ellsworth shipped over a million pounds annually to New York by the 1920s. The cooperative officially became Ellsworth Cooperative Creamery in 1938 and expanded through mergers with neighboring creameries in Lawton, Maiden Rock, Pepin, and Prescott. By 1965, it shifted into cheesemaking, launching its first cheese factory and debuting its signature Cheddar Cheese Curds—a product that became an instant favorite and defined the Creamery’s reputation. In 1983, Wisconsin Governor Anthony Earl declared Ellsworth the Cheese Curd Capital of Wisconsin, solidifying its legacy. Over the following decades, the cooperative continued to grow, adding a whey-drying plant, expanding into retail and international markets, and acquiring Comstock Creamery in 2011 and Wohlt Creamery in 2018. In 2022, Ellsworth opened a new, state-of-the-art specialty cheese plant and retail store in Menomonie, marking a major milestone in its continued innovation. Today, with more than 250 patron dairy farm families, Ellsworth Cooperative Creamery remains dedicated to producing high-quality milk and cheese while honoring over a century of dairy pride, craftsmanship, and community commitment.

== See also ==
- List of dairy product companies in the United States
