= Hersey, Wisconsin =

- Unincorporated community
- Location within Wisconsin Location within the United States
- Coordinates: 44°57′46″N 92°12′42″W
- Country: United States
- State: Wisconsin
- County: St. Croix
- Elevation: 1,197 ft (365 m)
- Time zone: UTC-6 (Central (CST))
  - Summer (DST): UTC-5 (CDT)
- Area codes: 715 & 534
- GNIS feature ID: 1581645

Hersey is an unincorporated community located in the town of Springfield, St. Croix County, Wisconsin, United States. Hersey is located along the Union Pacific Railroad, 2 miles (3.2 km) north-northwest of Wilson.

== History ==
A post office called Hersey was established in 1873, and remained in operation until it was discontinued in 1954. The community was named for Samuel F. Hersey, a partner in a logging firm based in Stillwater, Minnesota.
