= Rib Lake (town), Wisconsin =

Rib Lake, Wisconsin
- Town
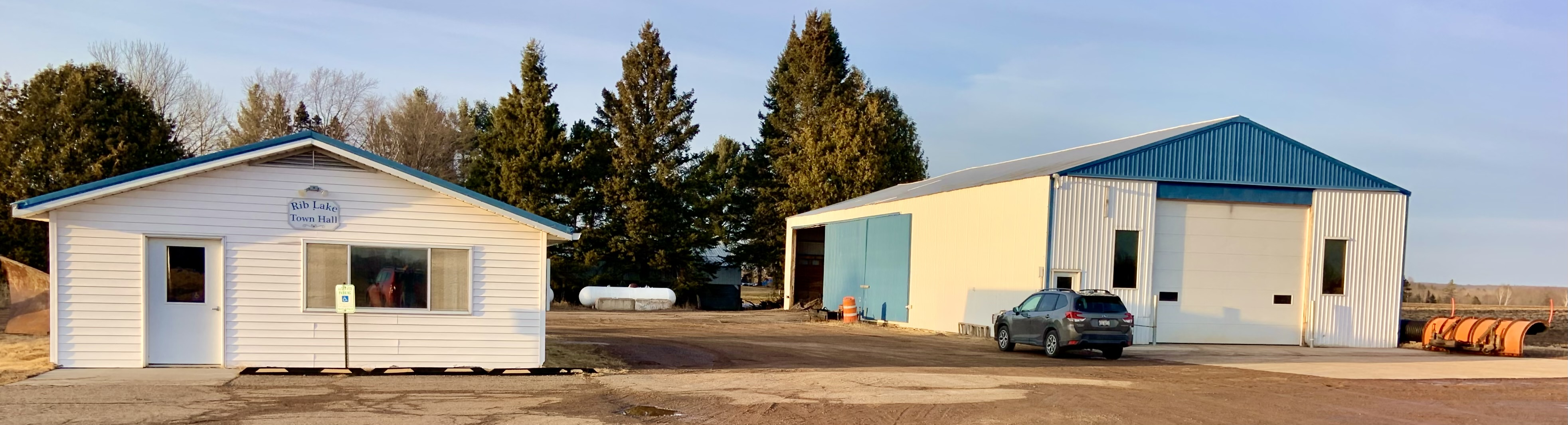
- Town hall

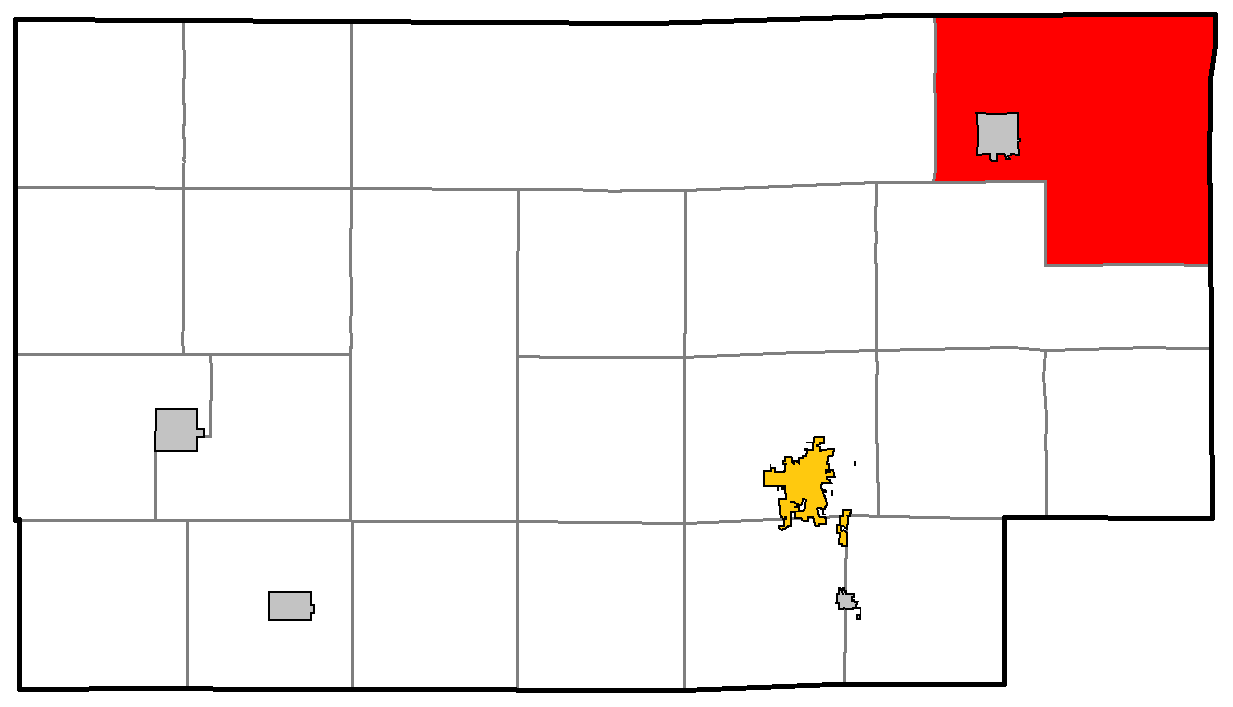
- Location of Rib Lake, within Taylor County

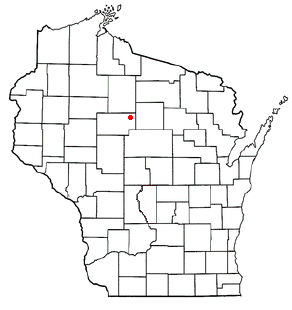
- Location of Rib Lake, Taylor County, Wisconsin
- Coordinates: 45°19′46″N 90°07′55″W
- Country: United States
- State: Wisconsin
- County: Taylor

Area
  - Total: 74.9 sq mi (193.9 km^{2})
  - Land: 74.0 sq mi (191.7 km^{2})
  - Water: 0.85 sq mi (2.2 km^{2})
- Elevation: 1,581 ft (482 m)

Population (2020)
  - Total: 763
  - Density: 10.3/sq mi (3.98/km^{2})
- Time zone: UTC-6 (Central (CST))
  - Summer (DST): UTC-5 (CDT)
- Area codes: 715 & 534
- GNIS ID: 1584017
- PLSS township: T33N R3E, eastern 2/3 of T33N R2E, and northern half of T32N R3E
- Website: https://www.townshipofgreenwood.com/

Rib Lake is a town in Taylor County, Wisconsin, United States. The population was 763 at the 2020 census. The village of Rib Lake is completely surrounded by the town.

== Geography ==
According to the United States Census Bureau, the town has a total area of 74.9 square miles (193.9 km^{2}), of which 74.0 square miles (191.7 km^{2}) is land and 0.9 square miles (2.2 km^{2}) (1.14%) is water.

The northern part of the town of Rib Lake lies within the Perkinstown terminal moraine, a line of hills bulldozed by the last glacier. Interspersed through the choppy land are small glacial lakes and ice-walled lake plains. Most of the south-central part of the town has a soil called Merrill till which was laid down by a much earlier glacier, giving it time to flatten out. Some bottoms along the Big Rib River are filled sandy deposits washed out of the last glacier.

== History ==
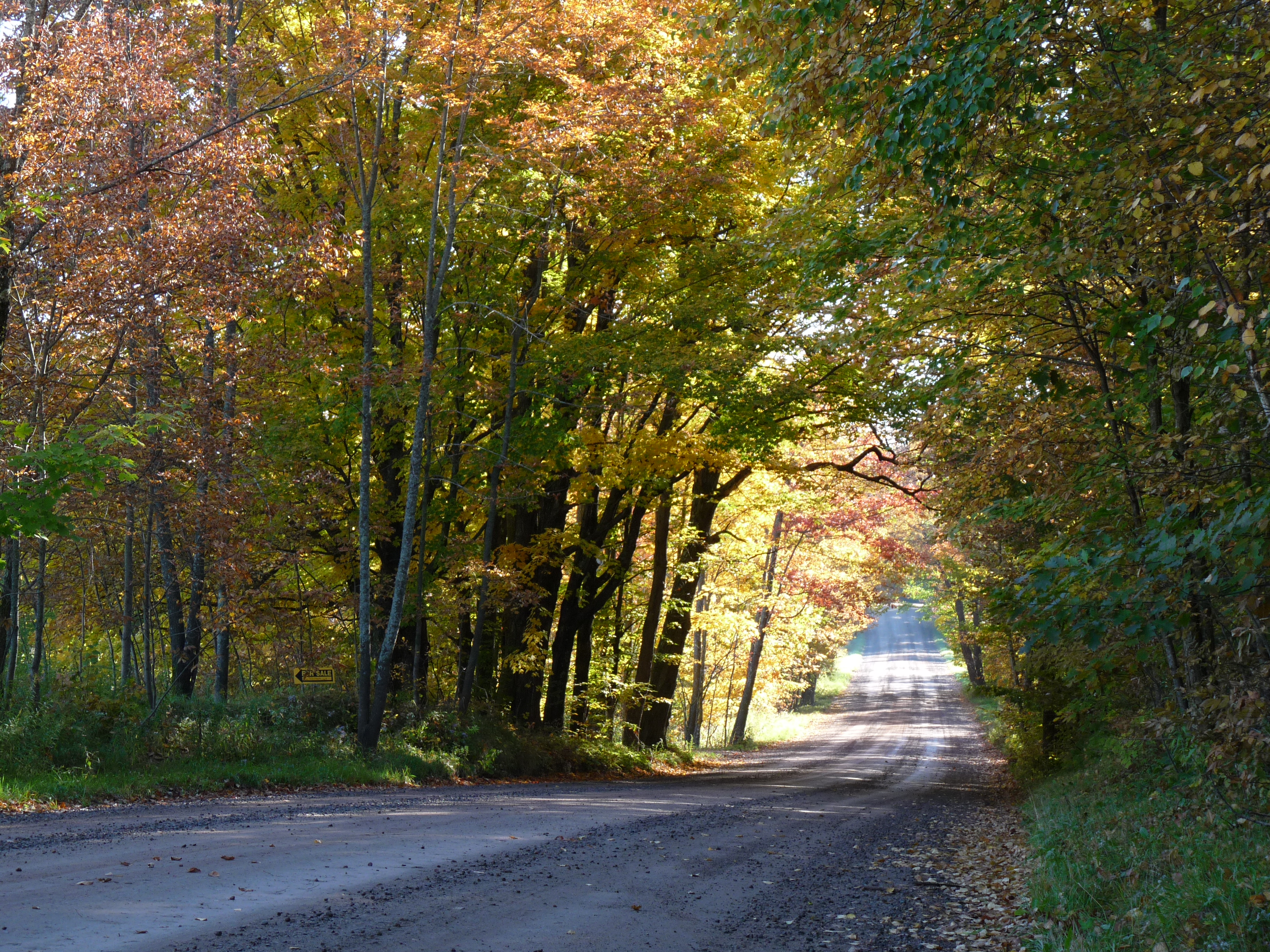
Rustic Road #1, near James Lake

Most of the edges of the six by six squares that would become Rib Lake were surveyed in October 1861 by a crew working for the U.S. government. In early 1862, the same crew marked all the section corners in the township, walking through the woods and swamps, measuring with chain and compass. When done, the deputy surveyor filed this general description for the six by six square that now contains the village of Rib Lake:

The Surface of this Township is generally rolling. Soil Fair 2nd Rate and good for agricultural purposes. Timber Hemlock Birch Sugar and White Pine of good quality. It is well watered by numerous Small Lakes and Streams of pure water.

Around 1873, the Wisconsin Central Railroad built its line just west of what would become Rib Lake, up through the forest that would become Medford and Westboro, heading for Ashland. To finance this undertaking, the railroad was granted half the land for eighteen miles on either side of the track laid - generally the odd-numbered sections.

When Taylor County was formed in 1875, the northern six miles of what would become Rib Lake was part of a larger Town of Westboro which spanned the county east to west. The southern three miles were part of a Town of Chelsea that also spanned the county. In 1885 Rib Lake was split off as its own town.

An 1880 map of the area shows only one road in what would become the town of Rib Lake - some sort of wagon road reaching east from Westboro 3.5 miles along the course of modern Rustic Road 1 to the north side of James Lake.

In 1881 J.J. Kennedy started the sawmill at Rib Lake, which sawed lumber from the surrounding country, and which established the village. Around 1883 the Wisconsin Central built a permanent spur line from north of Chelsea across the north end of Wellington Lake to the village of Rib Lake, to haul out products of the mill. Later, hemlock bark from the surrounding forests was another important early product, supplying the tannery in Rib Lake.

A map from around 1900 shows roads and settlers beginning to fill in parts of the township. By that time roads paralleled the railroad spur from Chelsea to the village of Rib Lake, and the road grid was already pretty complete for three miles west of Rib Lake. A wagon road followed most of the course of modern County C running north and south. A predecessor of modern Wilderness Avenue reached to north of Wood Lake. Another early road anticipated Berry Avenue. Another followed Zuther Avenue for several miles. Another followed the course of modern Rustic Road 1 and Berry Avenue across the north. Settlers' homesteads were sprinkled along all of these - thickest around the village of Rib Lake and none on the east end. Rural schools were marked at the modern intersection of Berry and County C, at Fawn Ave and Peche, and at C and Trout. J.J. Kennedy owned many large blocks wherever there weren't settlers. The Wisconsin Central still owned large parts of some odd-numbered sections. Other large land-holders were Fayette Shaw of the tannery in Rib Lake, C. McCrossen in the northeast corner, and J.O. Frank in the south.

The 1911 plat map showed the roads extended, with more settlers along them. By this time a town hall had appeared at the future intersection of C and Wilderness Avenue, and the northern school had moved to the future corner of Berry and Highway 102. Another school had been added a mile west of Wood Lake. Two sawmills had appeared where Wood Creek crosses the predecessor of Trout Avenue, and the Konz Post Office had appeared where Trout now meets County C. The Wisconsin Central had sold more of its land. Other large landholders by this time were the Rib Lake Lumber Company, U.S. Leather, Medford Manufacturing Co., and Wausau Lumber Co. on the east end.

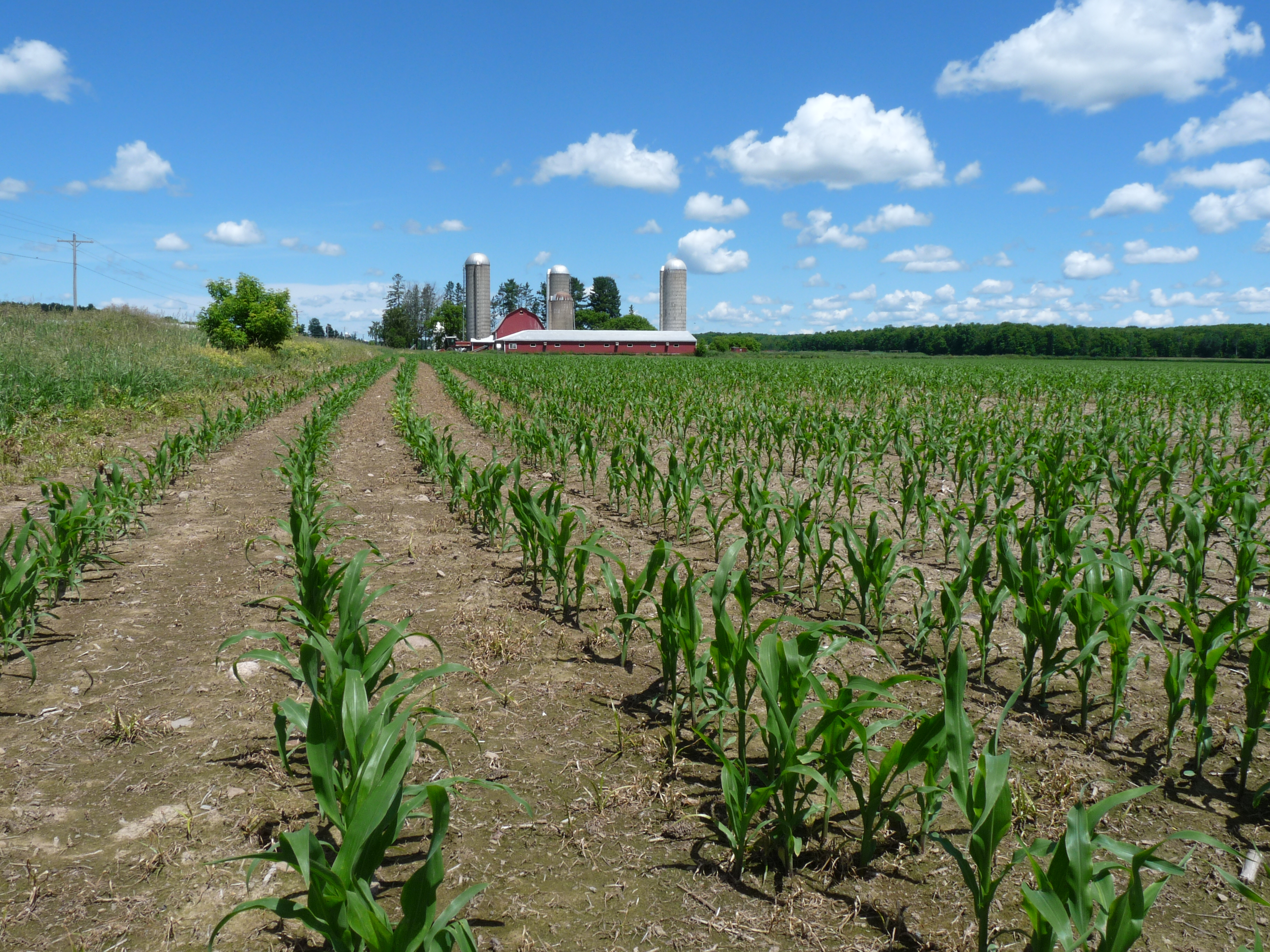
Parts of the south end of the town are fairly flat, including this farm along County C.

These maps also show the Soo Line's extension of the Rib Lake spur, built in 1902 east out of Rib Lake for a few miles, then turning north-northeast, eventually reaching Spirit Falls. There it connected with the Tomahawk, Marinette and Western Railroad out of Tomahawk. Branching east off this permanent spur, the Rib Lake Lumber Company laid temporary spurs to their logging camps around Wood Lake, pulling up the spurs and relaying them to the next camps every few years. This continued until 1948, feeding logs to the sawmill in Rib Lake and hemlock bark to the tannery.

Rustic Road #1, a scenic drive that winds over hills and around lakes and Wisconsin's first official Rustic Road, was dedicated in 1975.

== Demographics ==
At the 2000 census, there were 768 people, 278 households and 212 families residing in the town. The population density was 10.4 per square mile (4.0/km^{2}). There were 466 housing units at an average density of 6.3 per square mile (2.4/km^{2}). The racial makeup of the town was 98.31% White, 0.13% Native American, 1.17% Asian, 0.13% from other races, and 0.26% from two or more races. 0.52% of the population were Hispanic or Latino of any race.

There were 278 households, of which 33.5% had children under the age of 18 living with them, 66.9% were married couples living together, 6.8% had a female householder with no husband present, and 23.4% were non-families. 20.9% of all households were made up of individuals, and 8.3% had someone living alone who was 65 years of age or older. The average household size was 2.66 and the average family size was 3.08.

27.2% of the population were under the age of 18, 5.9% from 18 to 24, 27.3% from 25 to 44, 23.2% from 45 to 64, and 16.4% who were 65 years of age or older. The median age was 39 years. For every 100 females, there were 116.3 males. For every 100 females age 18 and over, there were 110.2 males.

The median household income was $38,393, and the median family income was $43,295. Males had a median income of $29,250 versus $21,103 for females. The per capita income for the town was $15,641. About 4.8% of families and 9.7% of the population were below the poverty line, including 12.4% of those under age 18 and 3.5% of those age 65 or over.

== See also ==
- Big Rib River
- History of Wisconsin, Logging
- Ice Age Trail
