= Spider Lake, Wisconsin =

- Town
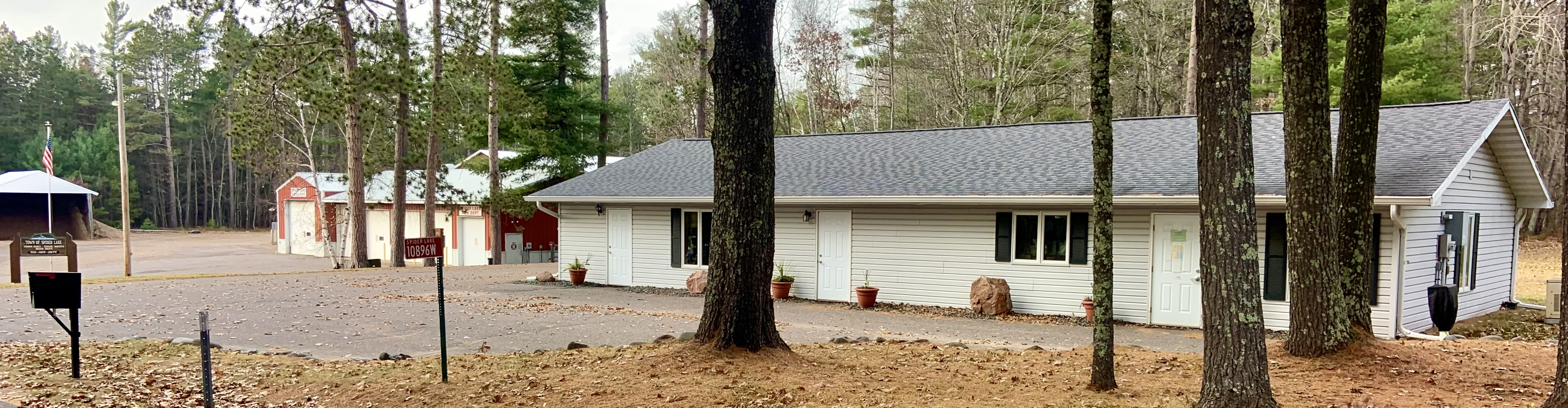
- Town hall

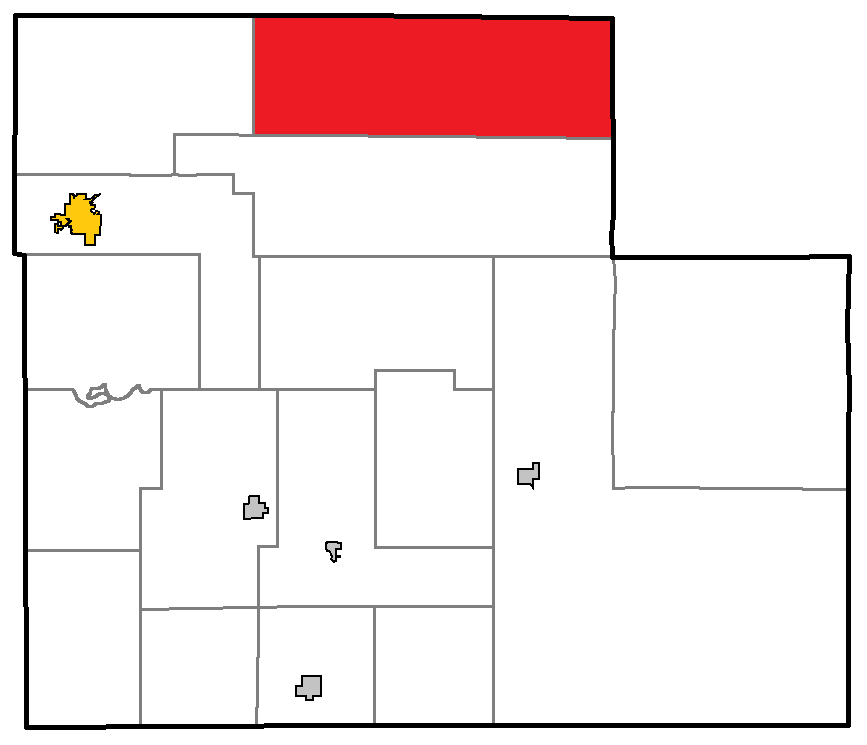
- Location of Spider Lake, within Sawyer County
- Coordinates: 46°5′50″N 91°7′48″W
- Country: United States
- State: Wisconsin
- County: Sawyer

Area
  - Total: 108.9 sq mi (282.0 km^{2})
  - Land: 99.3 sq mi (257.1 km^{2})
  - Water: 9.6 sq mi (24.9 km^{2})
- Elevation: 1,410 ft (430 m)

Population (2020)
  - Total: 487
  - Density: 4.91/sq mi (1.89/km^{2})
- Time zone: UTC-6 (Central (CST))
  - Summer (DST): UTC-5 (CDT)
- Area codes: 715 & 534
- FIPS code: 55-75450
- GNIS feature ID: 1584185
- Website: https://townofspiderlakewi.gov/

Spider Lake is a town in Sawyer County, Wisconsin, United States. The population was 487 at the 2020 census.

== Geography ==
According to the United States Census Bureau, the town has a total area of 108.9 square miles (282.0 km^{2}), of which 99.2 square miles (257.1 km^{2}) is land and 9.6 square mile (24.9 km^{2}) (8.84%) is water.

== Demographics ==
As of the census of 2000, there were 391 people, 186 households, and 137 families residing in the town. The population density was 3.9 people per square mile (1.5/km^{2}). There were 776 housing units at an average density of 7.8 per square mile (3.0/km^{2}). The racial makeup of the town was 96.93% White, 0.26% African American, 1.02% Native American, 0.51% from other races, and 1.28% from two or more races.

There were 186 households, out of which 13.4% had children under the age of 18 living with them, 66.7% were married couples living together, 4.3% had a female householder with no husband present, and 26.3% were non-families. 22.0% of all households were made up of individuals, and 10.2% had someone living alone who was 65 years of age or older. The average household size was 2.07 and the average family size was 2.39.

In the town, the population was spread out, with 12.5% under the age of 18, 1.0% from 18 to 24, 23.8% from 25 to 44, 33.5% from 45 to 64, and 29.2% who were 65 years of age or older. The median age was 53 years. For every 100 females, there were 106.9 males. For every 100 females age 18 and over, there were 112.4 males.

The median income for a household in the town was $37,396, and the median income for a family was $47,813. Males had a median income of $30,156 versus $26,094 for females. The per capita income for the town was $26,461. About 1.9% of families and 4.2% of the population were below the poverty line, including none of those under age 18 and 5.4% of those age 65 or over.
