= Forest, St. Croix County, Wisconsin =

Forest, Wisconsin
- Town
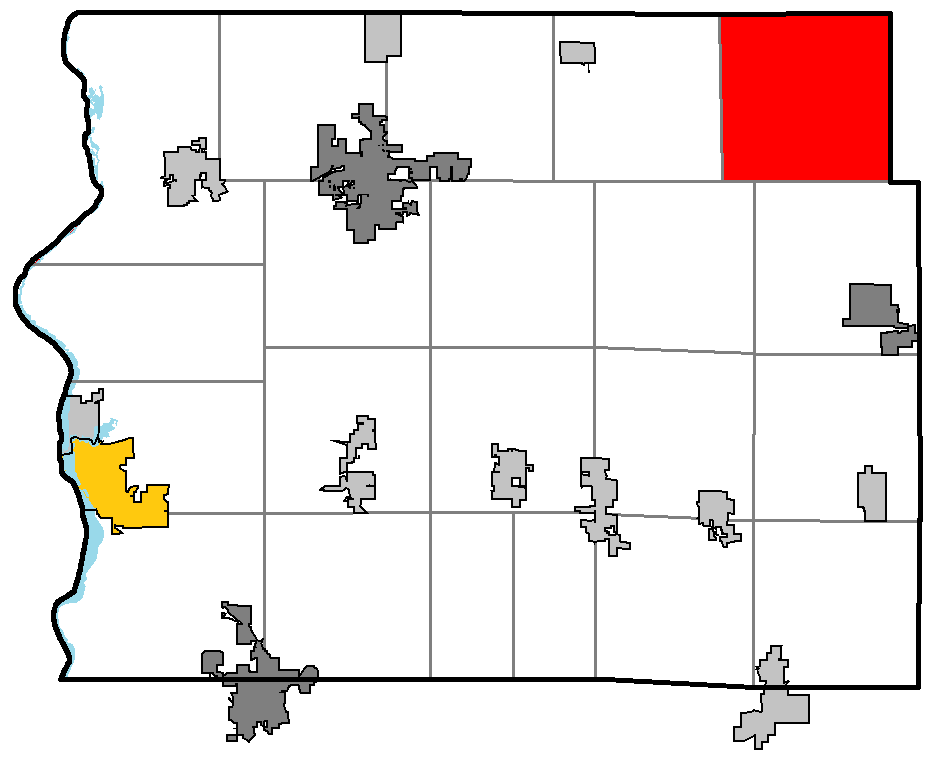
- Location of Forest, within St. Croix County

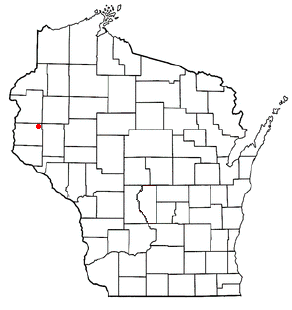
- Location of Forest, St. Croix County, Wisconsin
- Coordinates: 45°9′30″N 92°13′46″W
- Country: United States
- State: Wisconsin
- County: St. Croix

Area
  - Total: 37.2 sq mi (96.4 km^{2})
  - Land: 37.1 sq mi (96.2 km^{2})
  - Water: 0.039 sq mi (0.1 km^{2})
- Elevation: 1,210 ft (370 m)

Population (2020)
  - Total: 638
  - Density: 17.2/sq mi (6.63/km^{2})
- Time zone: UTC-6 (Central (CST))
  - Summer (DST): UTC-5 (CDT)
- Area codes: 715 & 534
- FIPS code: 55-26525
- GNIS feature ID: 1583215
- Website: https://townofforest.org/

Forest is a town in St. Croix County, Wisconsin, United States. The population was 638 at the 2020 census. The unincorporated community of Forest is located in the town.

== Geography ==
According to the United States Census Bureau, the town has a total area of 37.2 square miles (96.4 km^{2}), of which 37.2 square miles (96.2 km^{2}) is land and 0.1 square mile (0.1 km^{2}) (0.13%) is water.

== Demographics ==
Historical population
Census	Pop.	Note	%±
2010	629		—
2020	638		1.4%

As of the census of 2000, there were 590 people, 203 households, and 165 families residing in the town. The population density was 15.9 inhabitants per square mile (6.1/km^{2}). There were 218 housing units at an average density of 5.9 per square mile (2.3/km^{2}). The racial makeup of the town was 99.15% White, 0.17% Native American, 0.34% from other races, and 0.34% from two or more races. Hispanic or Latino of any race were 0.85% of the population.

There were 203 households, out of which 39.9% had children under the age of 18 living with them, 72.4% were married couples living together, 3.9% had a female householder with no husband present, and 18.7% were non-families. 14.3% of all households were made up of individuals, and 4.9% had someone living alone who was 65 years of age or older. The average household size was 2.91 and the average family size was 3.19.

In the town, the population was spread out, with 28.6% under the age of 18, 7.1% from 18 to 24, 28.6% from 25 to 44, 24.2% from 45 to 64, and 11.4% who were 65 years of age or older. The median age was 37 years. For every 100 females, there were 116.9 males. For every 100 females age 18 and over, there were 109.5 males.

The median income for a household in the town was $50,833, and the median income for a family was $60,000. Males had a median income of $36,023 versus $22,014 for females. The per capita income for the town was $21,427. About 4.3% of families and 8.3% of the population were below the poverty line, including 9.8% of those under age 18 and 5.1% of those age 65 or over.
