= Springfield, St. Croix County, Wisconsin =

Springfield, Wisconsin
- Town
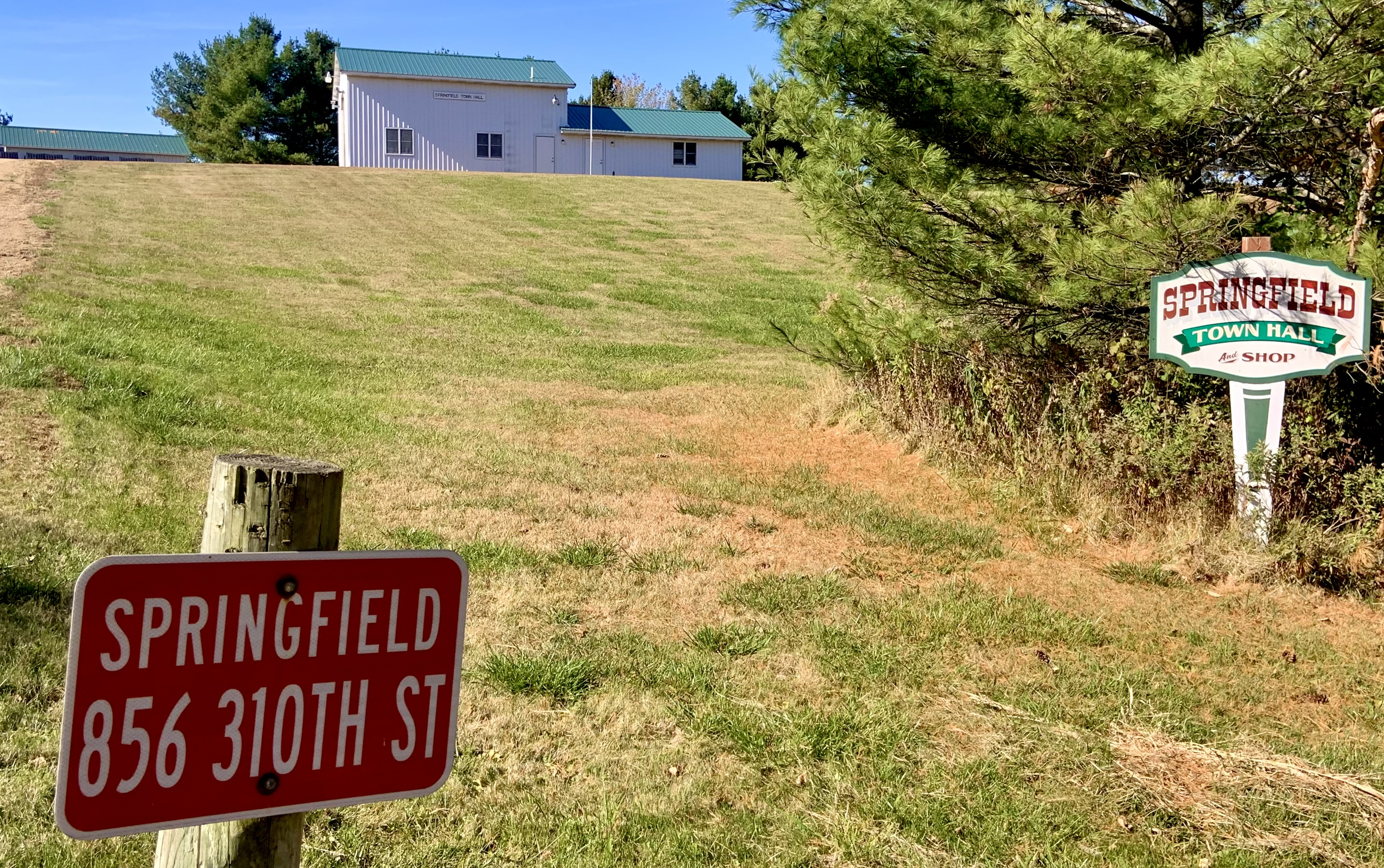
- Town hall

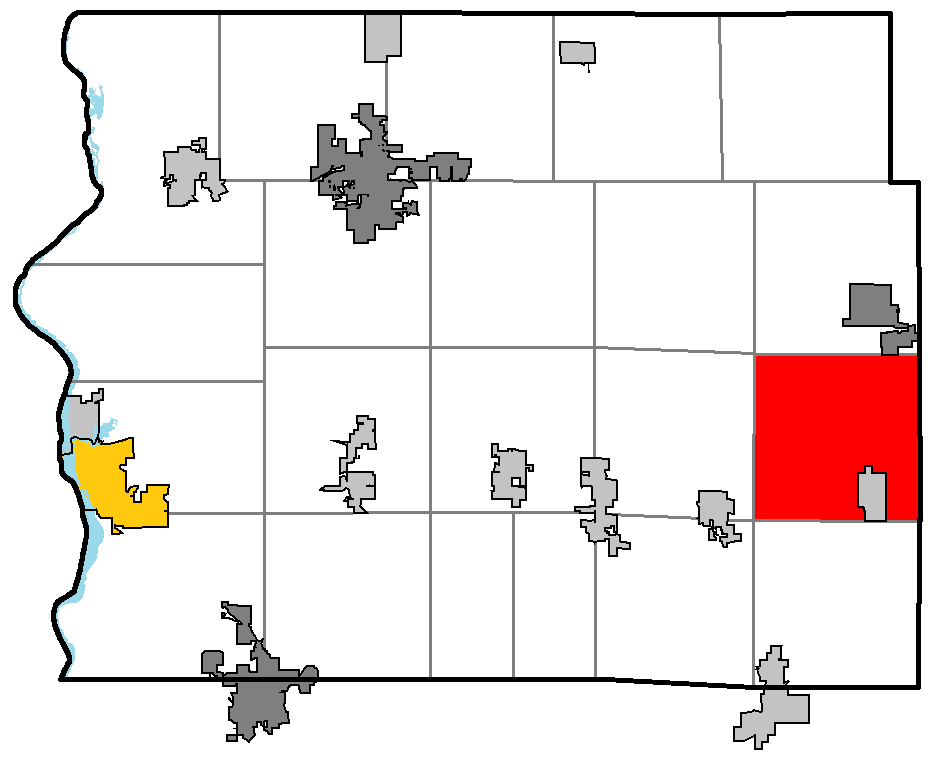
- Location of Springfield, within St. Croix County

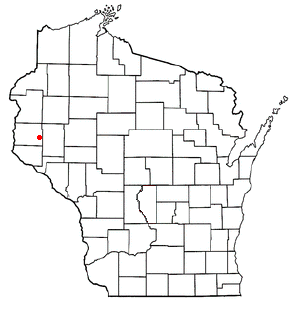
- Location of Springfield, St. Croix County, Wisconsin
- Coordinates: 44°58′51″N 92°11′11″W
- Country: United States
- State: Wisconsin
- County: St. Croix

Area
  - Total: 34.4 sq mi (89.0 km^{2})
  - Land: 34.2 sq mi (88.7 km^{2})
  - Water: 0.15 sq mi (0.4 km^{2})
- Elevation: 1,142 ft (348 m)

Population (2020)
  - Total: 993
  - Density: 29.0/sq mi (11.2/km^{2})
- Time zone: UTC-6 (Central (CST))
  - Summer (DST): UTC-5 (CDT)
- Area codes: 715 & 534
- FIPS code: 55-75950
- GNIS feature ID: 1584195
- Website: townofspringfield.com

Springfield is a town in St. Croix County, Wisconsin, United States. The population was 993 at the 2020 census. The unincorporated community of Hersey is located in the town.

== Geography ==
According to the United States Census Bureau, the town has a total area of 34.4 square miles (89.0 km^{2}), of which 34.2 square miles (88.7 km^{2}) is land and 0.2 square mile (0.4 km^{2}) (0.44%) is water.

== Demographics ==
Historical population
Census	Pop.	Note	%±
2000	808		—
2010	932		15.3%
2020	993		6.5%

As of the census of 2000, there were 808 people, 285 households, and 220 families residing in the town. The population density was 23.6 inhabitants per square mile (9.1/km^{2}). There were 299 housing units at an average density of 8.7 per square mile (3.4/km^{2}). The racial makeup of the town was 95.17% White, 0.12% African American, 0.12% Native American, 2.97% Asian, 0.37% from other races, and 1.24% from two or more races. Hispanic or Latino of any race were 0.50% of the population.

There were 285 households, out of which 34.4% had children under the age of 18 living with them, 67.0% were married couples living together, 6.0% had a female householder with no husband present, and 22.5% were non-families. 16.1% of all households were made up of individuals, and 3.9% had someone living alone who was 65 years of age or older. The average household size was 2.84 and the average family size was 3.20.

In the town, the population was spread out, with 27.2% under the age of 18, 8.3% from 18 to 24, 29.2% from 25 to 44, 24.8% from 45 to 64, and 10.5% who were 65 years of age or older. The median age was 38 years. For every 100 females, there were 109.3 males. For every 100 females age 18 and over, there were 110.8 males.

The median income for a household in the town was $54,886, and the median income for a family was $56,154. Males had a median income of $36,932 versus $22,241 for females. The per capita income for the town was $21,303. About 0.9% of families and 2.4% of the population were below the poverty line, including none of those under age 18 and 3.4% of those age 65 or over.
