= Wilson, St. Croix County, Wisconsin =

Wilson
- Village
- Location of Wilson in St. Croix County, Wisconsin.

- Location within the state of Wisconsin
- Coordinates: 44°57′15″N 92°10′31″W
- Country: United States
- State: Wisconsin
- County: St. Croix

Area
  - Total: 1.71 sq mi (4.42 km^{2})
  - Land: 1.71 sq mi (4.42 km^{2})
  - Water: 0 sq mi (0.00 km^{2})

Population (2020)
  - Total: 209
  - Density: 122/sq mi (47.3/km^{2})
- Time zone: UTC-6 (Central (CST))
  - Summer (DST): UTC-5 (CDT)
- Area codes: 715 & 534
- FIPS code: 55-87475
- GNIS feature ID: 1584447

Wilson is a village in St. Croix County, Wisconsin, United States. The population was 209 at the 2020 census.

== History ==
Wilson was founded in 1870. It was named for Captain William Wilson, a businessperson in the lumber industry. A post office has been in operation in Wilson since 1873.

== Geography ==
Wilson is located at 44°57′15″N 92°10′31″W (44.954167, -92.175180).

According to the United States Census Bureau, the village has a total area of 1.63 square miles (4.22 km^{2}), all land.

== Demographics ==
Historical population
Census	Pop.	Note	%±
1880	442		—
1890	393		−11.1%
1920	222		—
1930	200		−9.9%
1940	188		−6.0%
1950	174		−7.4%
1960	140		−19.5%
1970	130		−7.1%
1980	155		19.2%
1990	163		5.2%
2000	176		8.0%
2010	184		4.5%
2020	209		13.6%
U.S. Decennial Census

=== 2010 census ===
As of the census of 2010, there were 184 people, 72 households, and 54 families living in the village. The population density was 112.9 inhabitants per square mile (43.6/km^{2}). There were 78 housing units at an average density of 47.9 per square mile (18.5/km^{2}). The racial makeup of the village was 97.8% White, 0.5% Native American, and 1.6% from two or more races. Hispanic or Latino of any race were 0.5% of the population.

There were 72 households, of which 34.7% had children under the age of 18 living with them, 65.3% were married couples living together, 6.9% had a female householder with no husband present, 2.8% had a male householder with no wife present, and 25.0% were non-families. 18.1% of all households were made up of individuals, and 11.1% had someone living alone who was 65 years of age or older. The average household size was 2.56 and the average family size was 2.91.

The median age in the village was 39.5 years. 24.5% of residents were under the age of 18; 4.4% were between the ages of 18 and 24; 28.8% were from 25 to 44; 32.1% were from 45 to 64; and 10.3% were 65 years of age or older. The gender makeup of the village was 50.5% male and 49.5% female.

=== 2000 census ===
As of the census of 2000, there were 176 people, 66 households, and 52 families living in the village. The population density was 113.5 inhabitants per square mile (43.8/km^{2}). There were 69 housing units at an average density of 44.5 per square mile (17.2/km^{2}). The racial makeup of the village was 95.45% White, 3.98% Asian, and 0.57% from two or more races. Hispanic or Latino of any race were 1.14% of the population.

There were 66 households, out of which 34.8% had children under the age of 18 living with them, 71.2% were married couples living together, 3.0% had a female householder with no husband present, and 21.2% were non-families. 18.2% of all households were made up of individuals, and 10.6% had someone living alone who was 65 years of age or older. The average household size was 2.67 and the average family size was 3.02.

In the village, the population was spread out, with 25.0% under the age of 18, 6.3% from 18 to 24, 32.4% from 25 to 44, 19.3% from 45 to 64, and 17.0% who were 65 years of age or older. The median age was 36 years. For every 100 females, there were 112.0 males. For every 100 females age 18 and over, there were 91.3 males.

The median income for a household in the village was $35,893, and the median income for a family was $43,438. Males had a median income of $33,125 versus $30,417 for females. The per capita income for the village was $17,389. None of the families and 6.4% of the population were living below the poverty line, including no under eighteens and 29.0% of those over 64.

== Notable people ==
- Kenneth H. Dahlberg, World War II fighter ace and businessman
