= Ellsworth, Wisconsin =

- Village
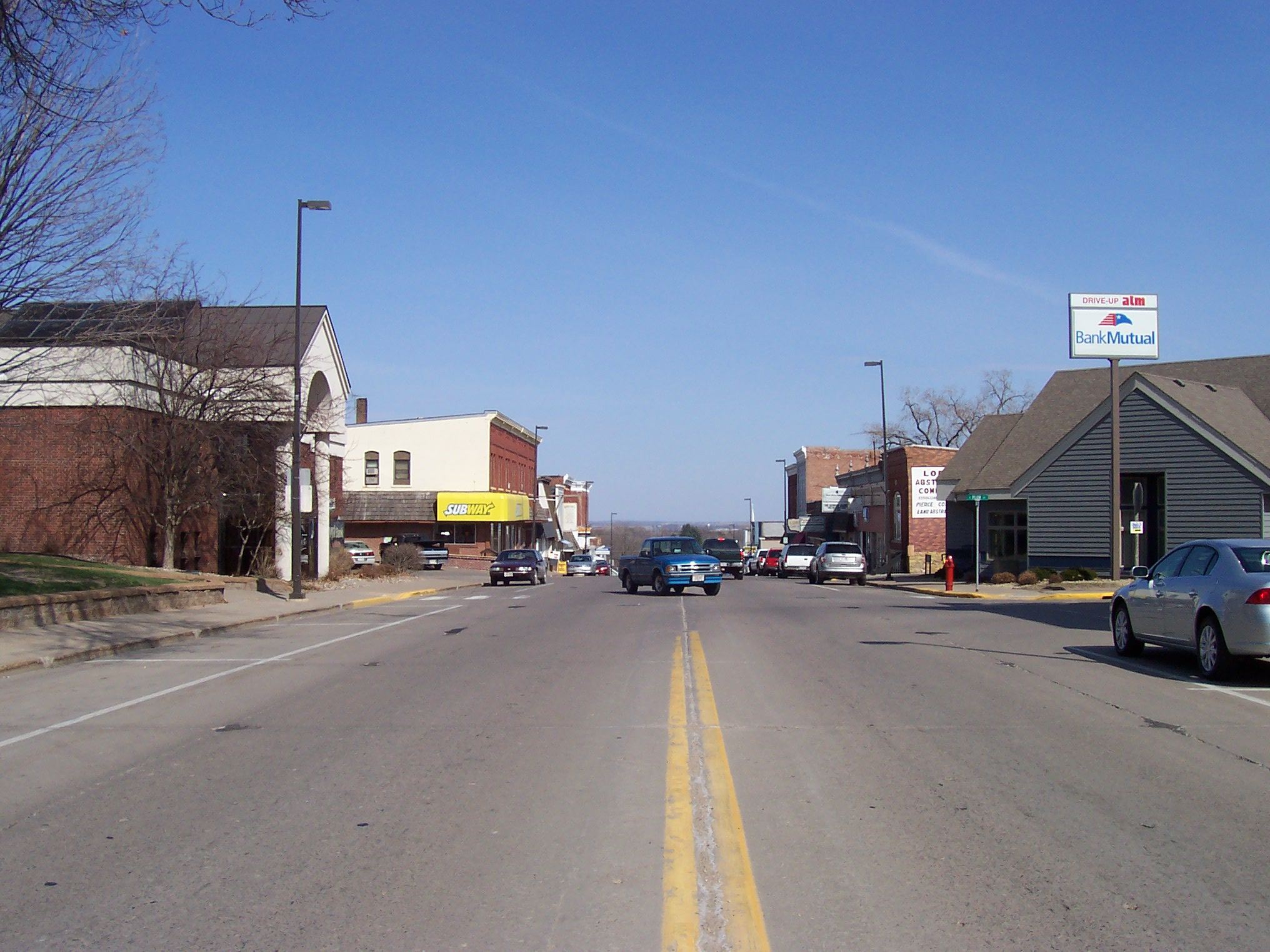
- Downtown Ellsworth

- Location of Ellsworth in Pierce County, Wisconsin
- Coordinates: 44°43′57″N 92°28′48″W
- Country: United States
- State: Wisconsin
- County: Pierce
- Established: 1887

Government
  - Village Board President: Becky Beissel

Area
  - Total: 3.80 sq mi (9.84 km^{2})
  - Land: 3.80 sq mi (9.83 km^{2})
  - Water: 0 sq mi (0.00 km^{2})
- Elevation: 1,033 ft (315 m)

Population (2020)
  - Total: 3,348
  - Density: 881.7/sq mi (340.4/km^{2})
- Time zone: UTC-6 (CST)
  - Summer (DST): UTC-5 (CDT)
- Zipcode: 54011, 54010
- Area codes: 715 & 534
- FIPS code: 55-23525
- GNIS feature ID: 1564550
- Website: www.villageofellsworth.org

Ellsworth is a village in and the county seat of Pierce County, Wisconsin, United States. The population was 3,348 at the 2020 census. The village is adjacent to the Town of Ellsworth and incorporates the former community of East Ellsworth. Ellsworth is home to the Ellsworth Cooperative Creamery, a farmer-owned dairy cooperative established in 1910, and hosts the annual Cheese Curd Festival, celebrating the community's dairy heritage.

== History ==
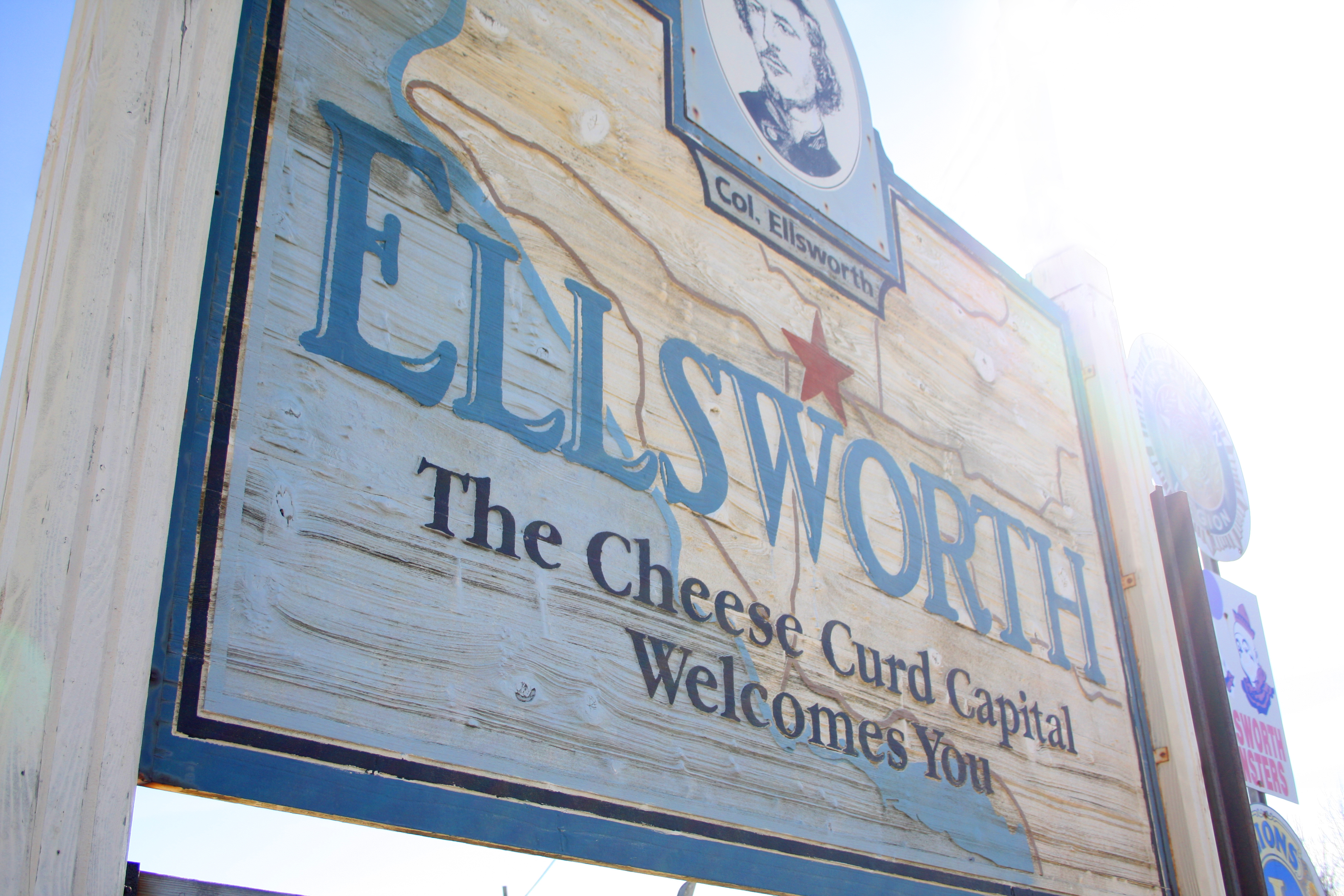
Welcome sign at the entrance to Ellsworth, Wisconsin

Settlement in the area that now comprises the village of Ellsworth began with the arrival of several families in 1857. The village was officially platted in 1862, then incorporated in 1887. The village was initially called Perry, in honor of the War of 1812 hero, Oliver Hazard Perry, but was renamed in 1866 in honor of Col. Elmer E. Ellsworth, the first Union officer to die in the Civil War. A close friend of Pres. Abraham Lincoln, Ellsworth died while removing a highly visible Confederate flag from the roof of a hotel overlooking the Potomac River in Alexandria, Virginia. The incident received national attention, and at least one other town, Ellsworth, Michigan, was named in his honor.

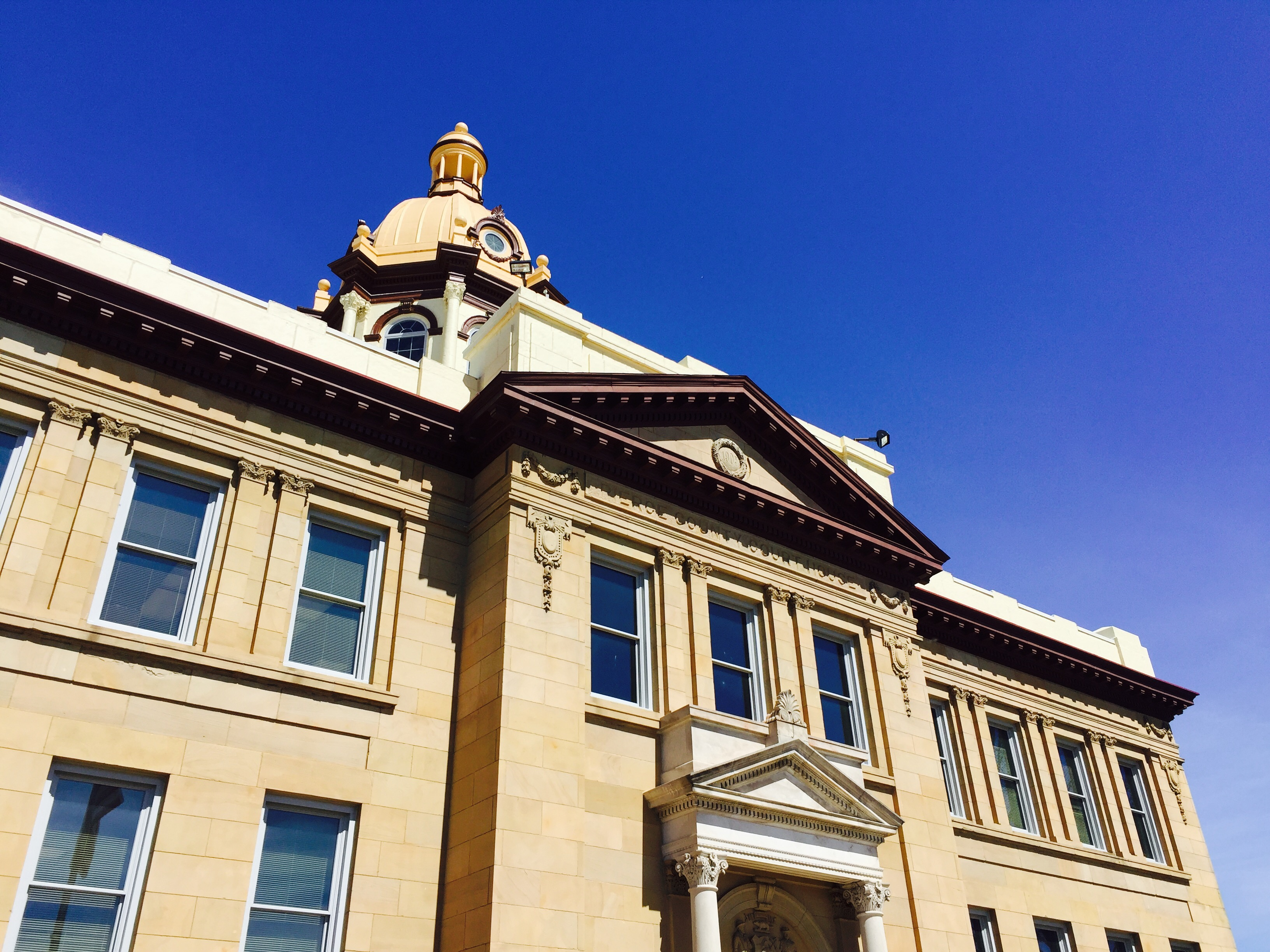
Pierce County Courthouse in Ellsworth

Downtown Ellsworth's location atop a steep hill is the result of an 1861 dispute between Pierce County's two major towns, Prescott and River Falls, over which should be county seat. The compromise reached was to draw lines on a map connecting the corners of the county, northwest to southeast and northeast to southwest. The intersection of these lines at a densely forested site at the top of a ridge determined the placement of the new town. A log building was hastily erected to serve as a courthouse, then replaced by a wood-frame structure about two years later. The current Pierce County Courthouse, built 1905, was designed by the noted St. Paul firm of Buechner & Orth. The structure exhibits characteristics of both the neoclassical and Beaux-Arts styles, topped by a large dome above a five-story hexagonal rotunda.

== Geography ==
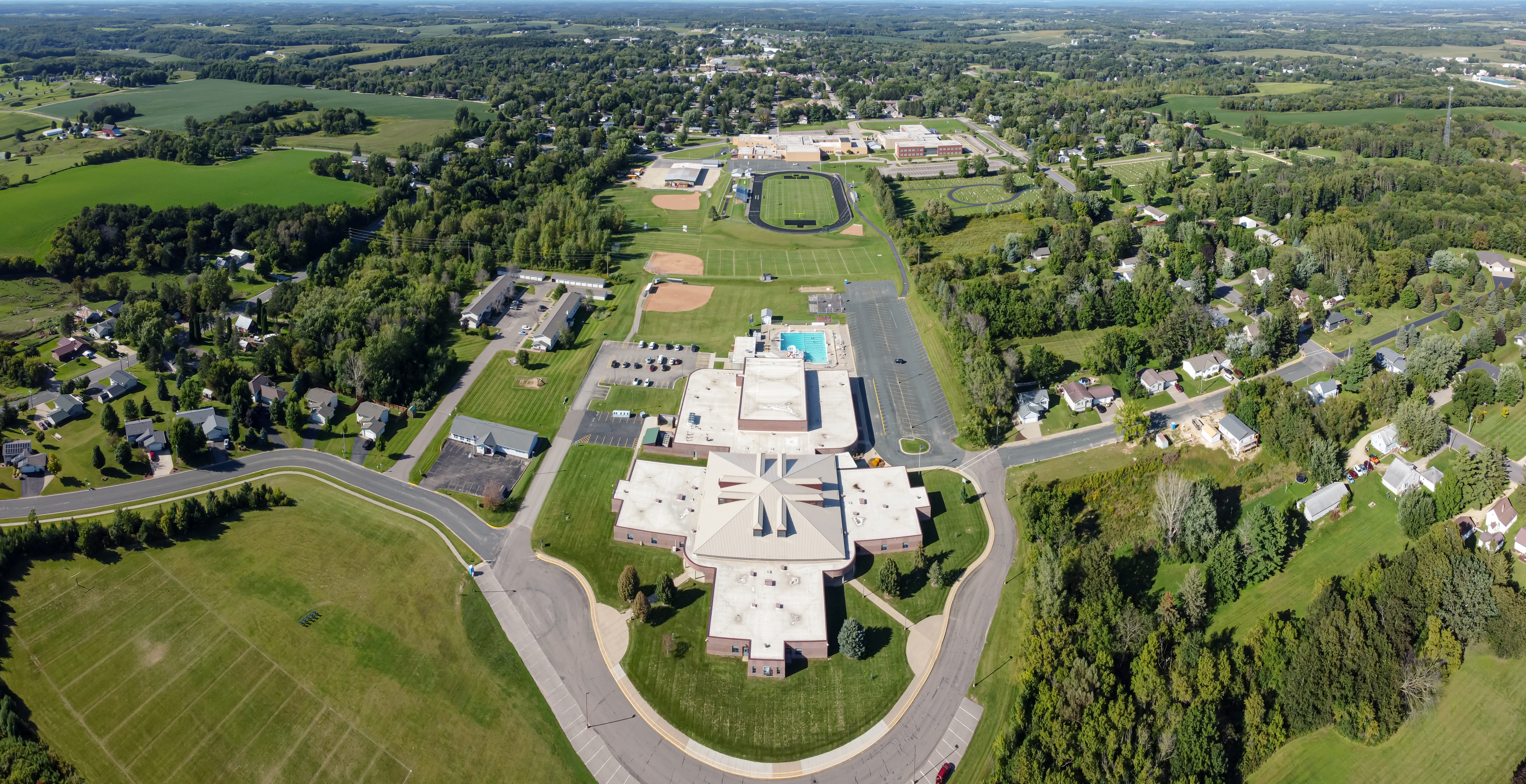

According to the United States Census Bureau, the village has a total area of 3.75 square miles (9.71 km^{2}), all land.

Ellsworth is located at 44°43′57″N 92°28′48″W (44.73261, -92.480177).

Ellsworth is along U.S. Highways 10 and 63, and Wisconsin Highways 65 and 72.

=== Climate ===
Climate data for Ellsworth, Wisconsin (1991–2020 normals, extremes 1908–1909, 1944–present)
Month	Jan	Feb	Mar	Apr	May	Jun	Jul	Aug	Sep	Oct	Nov	Dec	Year
Record high °F (°C)	53 (12)	64 (18)	80 (27)	88 (31)	94 (34)	98 (37)	105 (41)	99 (37)	96 (36)	90 (32)	77 (25)	63 (17)	105 (41)
Mean daily maximum °F (°C)	21.3 (−5.9)	26.6 (−3.0)	39.2 (4.0)	54.2 (12.3)	66.4 (19.1)	75.6 (24.2)	79.5 (26.4)	77.5 (25.3)	70.6 (21.4)	57.0 (13.9)	40.4 (4.7)	26.6 (−3.0)	52.9 (11.6)
Daily mean °F (°C)	11.9 (−11.2)	16.4 (−8.7)	28.9 (−1.7)	42.5 (5.8)	54.8 (12.7)	64.5 (18.1)	68.4 (20.2)	66.2 (19.0)	58.9 (14.9)	45.8 (7.7)	31.1 (−0.5)	18.3 (−7.6)	42.3 (5.7)
Mean daily minimum °F (°C)	2.4 (−16.4)	6.1 (−14.4)	18.6 (−7.4)	30.8 (−0.7)	43.1 (6.2)	53.4 (11.9)	57.3 (14.1)	55.0 (12.8)	47.3 (8.5)	34.6 (1.4)	21.8 (−5.7)	10.0 (−12.2)	31.7 (−0.2)
Record low °F (°C)	−37 (−38)	−37 (−38)	−29 (−34)	1 (−17)	19 (−7)	31 (−1)	38 (3)	35 (2)	22 (−6)	8 (−13)	−15 (−26)	−40 (−40)	−40 (−40)
Average precipitation inches (mm)	1.01 (26)	1.00 (25)	1.99 (51)	2.99 (76)	4.51 (115)	5.25 (133)	4.11 (104)	5.04 (128)	3.87 (98)	2.84 (72)	1.97 (50)	1.36 (35)	35.94 (913)
Average precipitation days (≥ 0.01 in)	7.4	5.7	7.5	10.2	12.8	12.9	10.2	9.7	9.6	9.7	7.3	7.7	110.7
Source: NOAA

== Demographics ==
Historical population
Census	Pop.	Note	%±
1880	432		—
1890	670		55.1%
1900	1,052		57.0%
1910	1,005		−4.5%
1920	1,043		3.8%
1930	1,124		7.8%
1940	1,340		19.2%
1950	1,475		10.1%
1960	1,701		15.3%
1970	1,983		16.6%
1980	2,143		8.1%
1990	2,706		26.3%
2000	2,909		7.5%
2010	3,284		12.9%
2020	3,348		1.9%
U.S. Decennial Census 2020

=== 2020 census ===
As of the census of 2020, the population was 3,348. The population density was 881.7 inhabitants per square mile (340.4/km^{2}). There were 1,467 housing units at an average density of 386.4 per square mile (149.2/km^{2}). The racial makeup of the village was 93.2% White, 0.7% Black or African American, 0.4% Native American, 0.1% Asian, 1.1% from other races, and 4.5% from two or more races. Ethnically, the population was 3.0% Hispanic or Latino of any race.

=== 2010 census ===
As of the census of 2010, there were 3,284 people, 1,331 households, and 827 families residing in the village. The population density was 875.7 inhabitants per square mile (338.1/km^{2}). There were 1,434 housing units at an average density of 382.4 per square mile (147.6/km^{2}). The racial makeup of the village was 96.6% White, 0.3% African American, 0.3% Native American, 0.4% Asian, 0.8% from other races, and 1.6% from two or more races. Hispanic or Latino of any race were 1.5% of the population.

There were 1,331 households, of which 34.5% had children under the age of 18 living with them, 44.9% were married couples living together, 12.1% had a female householder with no husband present, 5.1% had a male householder with no wife present, and 37.9% were non-families. 31.6% of all households were made up of individuals, and 13.2% had someone living alone who was 65 years of age or older. The average household size was 2.39 and the average family size was 2.98.

The median age in the village was 35.7 years. 26.2% of residents were under the age of 18; 7.9% were between the ages of 18 and 24; 27.8% were from 25 to 44; 23.7% were from 45 to 64; and 14.5% were 65 years of age or older. The gender makeup of the village was 49.0% male and 51.0% female.

=== 2000 income statistics ===
As of 2000 the median income for a household in the village was $42,604, and the median income for a family was $51,286. Males had a median income of $36,069 versus $25,000 for females. The per capita income for the village was $18,661. About 2.6% of families and 5.4% of the population were below the poverty line, including 4.4% of those under age 18 and 7.9% of those age 65 or over.

== East Ellsworth ==
The steep grades approaching Ellsworth's hilltop location proved an insurmountable challenge to railroad construction. When the Chicago, St. Paul, Minneapolis and Omaha Railway ("Omaha Road") surveyed a branch line to the locale in 1885, it bypassed the village and constructed a depot about one mile away at the foot of the grade. The businesses that grew up by the station coalesced into the independent village of East Ellsworth. The Isabelle Creek runs through East Ellsworth.

== Economy ==
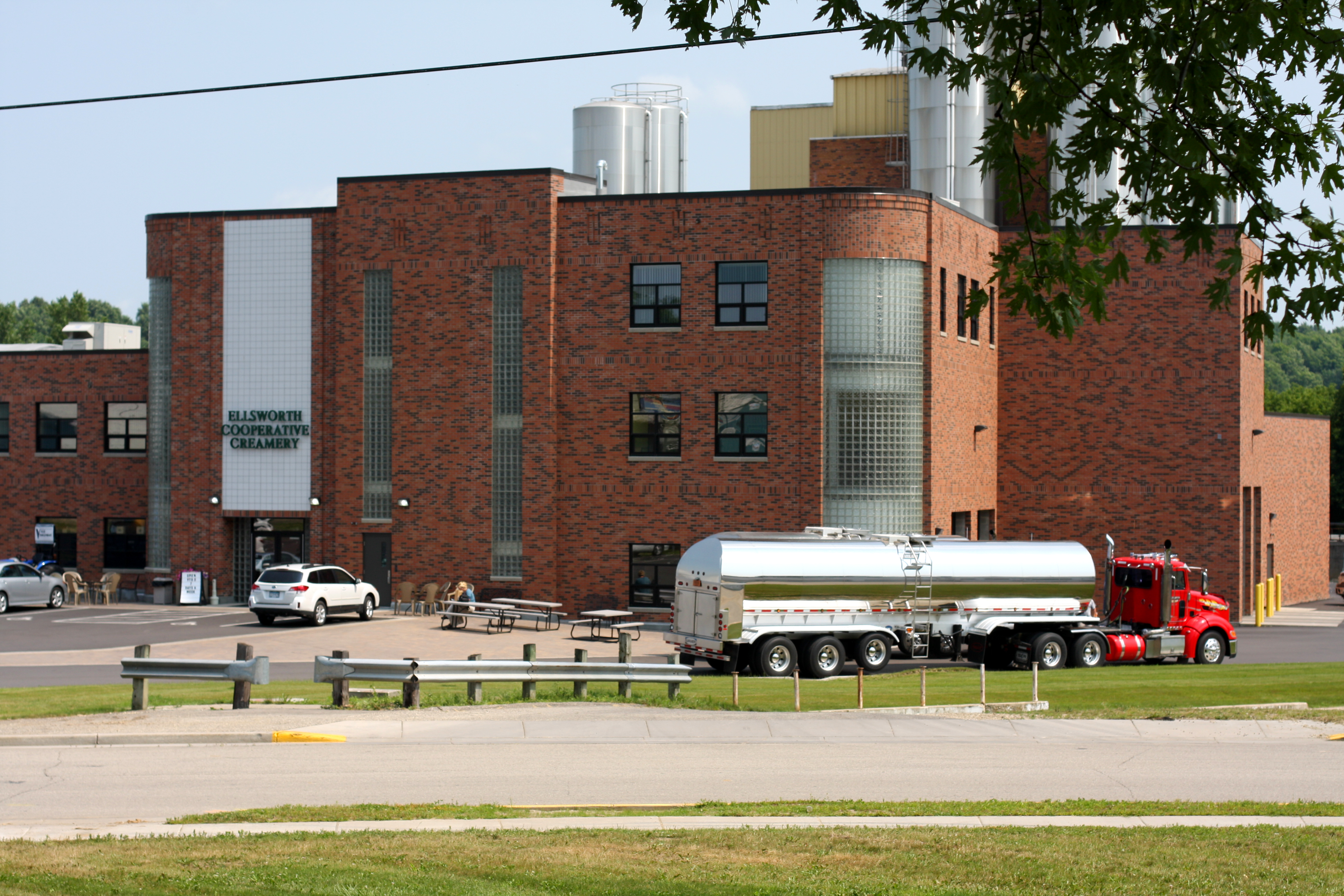
Ellsworth Cooperative Creamery in Ellsworth

The economy of Ellsworth has long been tied to agriculture and dairy production. The village is home to the Ellsworth Cooperative Creamery, a farmer-owned dairy cooperative established in 1910. The creamery produces a variety of cheese and dairy products and has become nationally recognized for its fresh cheese curds, contributing to Ellsworth's identity as the "Cheese Curd Capital of Wisconsin."

== Cheese Curd Festival ==
The Cheese Curd Festival is held annually in Ellsworth during the last weekend of June. The festival celebrates Ellsworth's reputation as the "Cheese Curd Capital of Wisconsin" and features cheese curd cuisine, live entertainment, tasting experiences, and family activities. In 2026, the festival was ranked No. 4 among specialty food festivals in the nation in the USA TODAY 10Best Readers' Choice Awards, marking its fourth consecutive appearance in the rankings.

== Notable people ==
- Leon D. Case, former Michigan Secretary of State, was born in Ellsworth.
- William Walter Clark, former member of the Wisconsin State Assembly and Wisconsin State Senate, attended school in Ellsworth.
- Charles H. Crownhart, former Justice of the Wisconsin Supreme Court, practiced law in Ellsworth.
- Franklin L. Gilson, Wisconsin State Assembly and jurist, practiced law in Ellsworth.
- George Thompson, former Attorney General of Wisconsin, was born in Ellsworth.
- Hans Warner, Wisconsin Secretary of State and Wisconsin State Senator, lived in Ellsworth.
- Dempster Woodworth, Wisconsin State Senator and physician, lived in Ellsworth.
