= Tornadoes of 1958 =

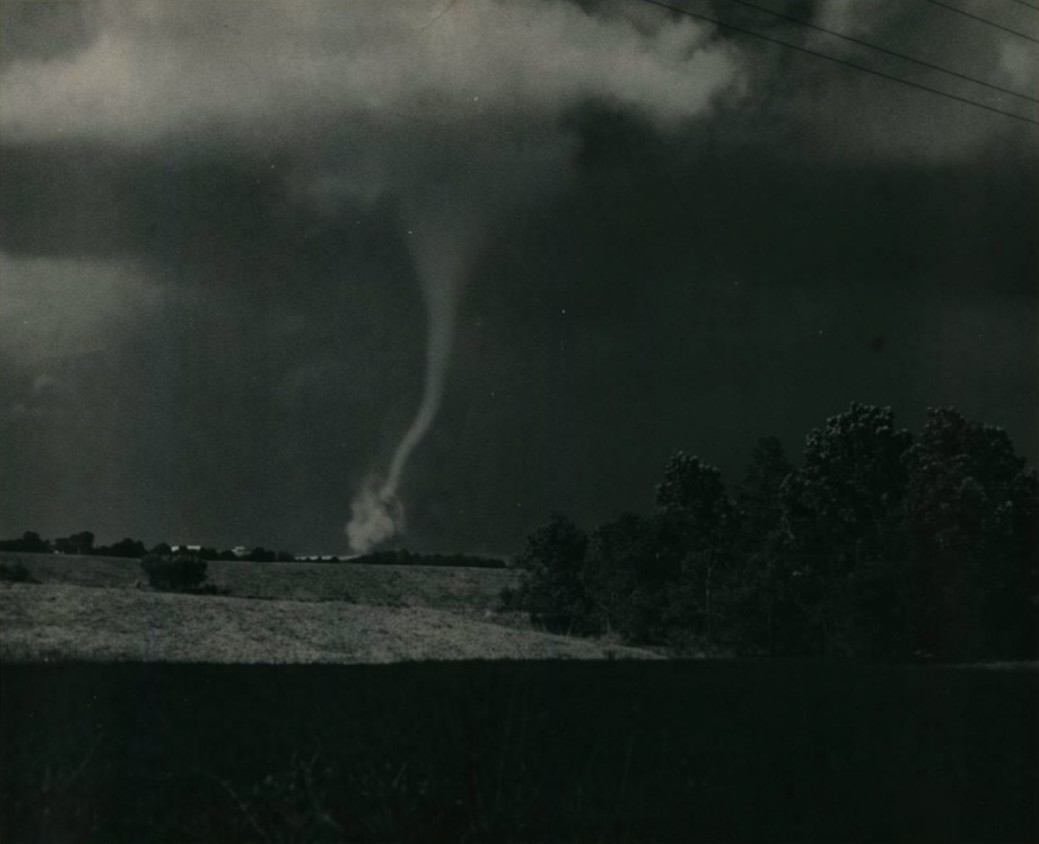
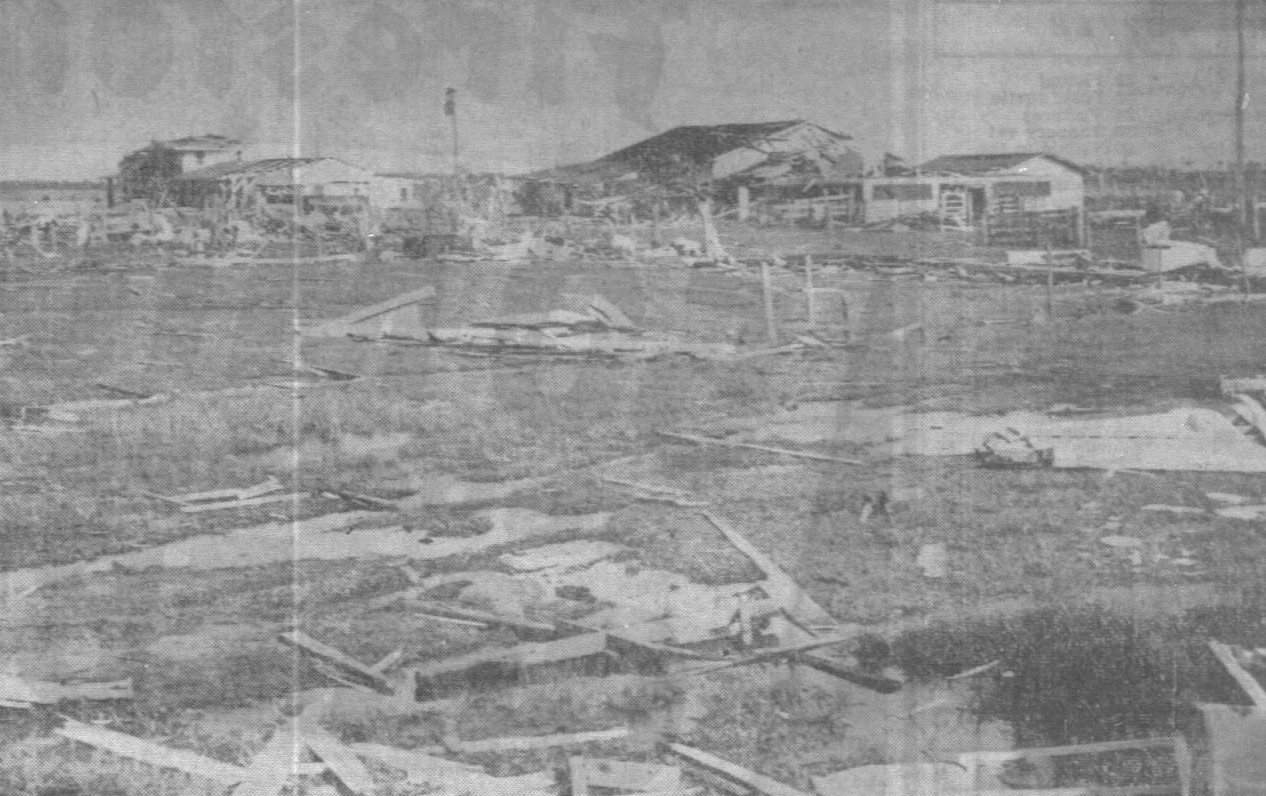
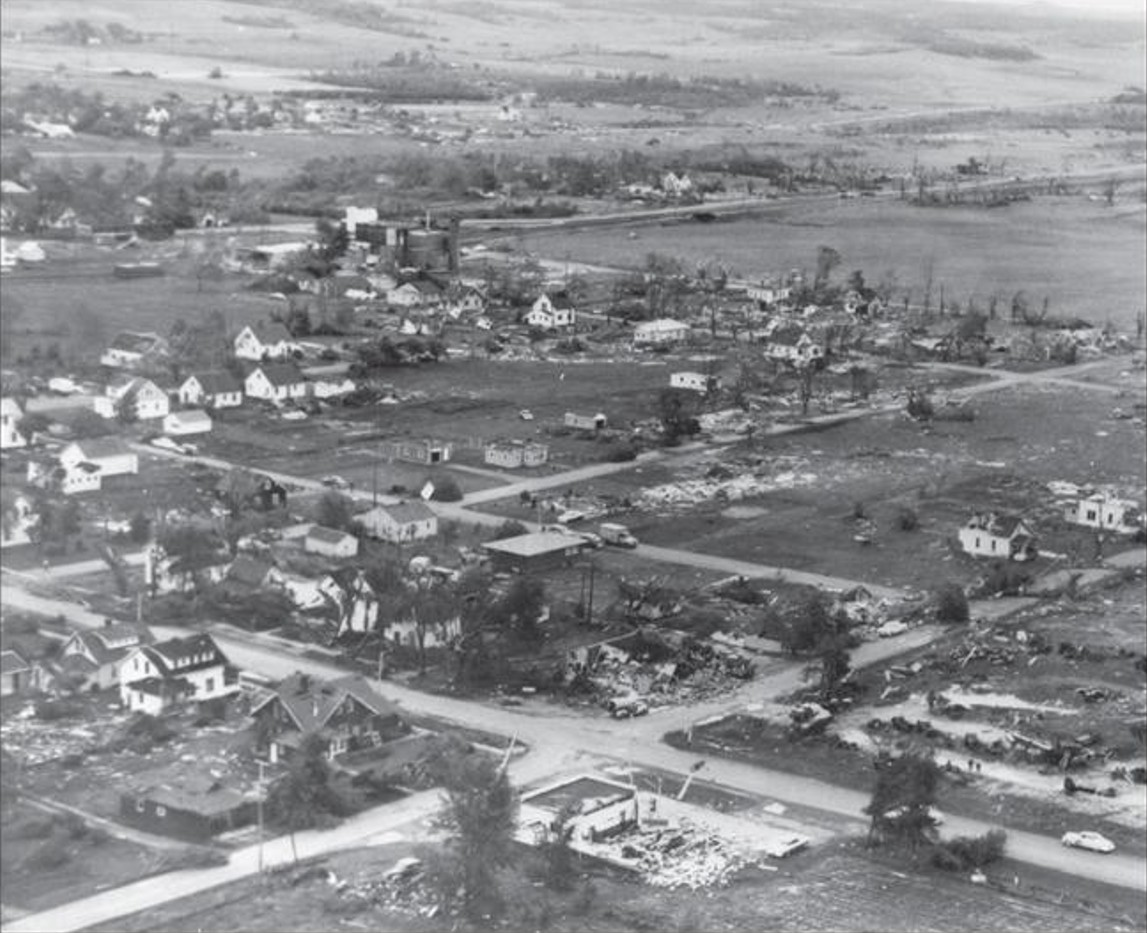
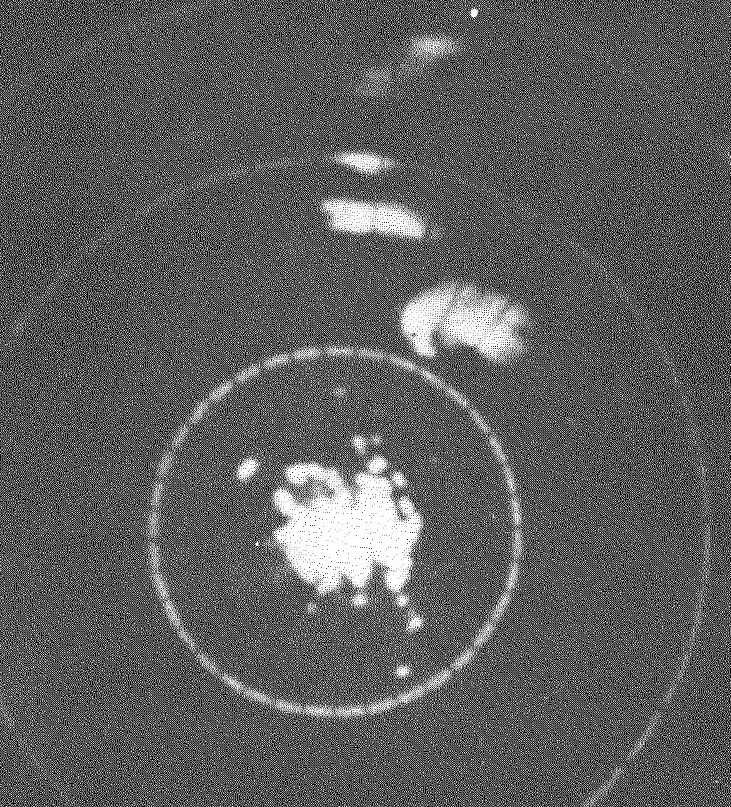
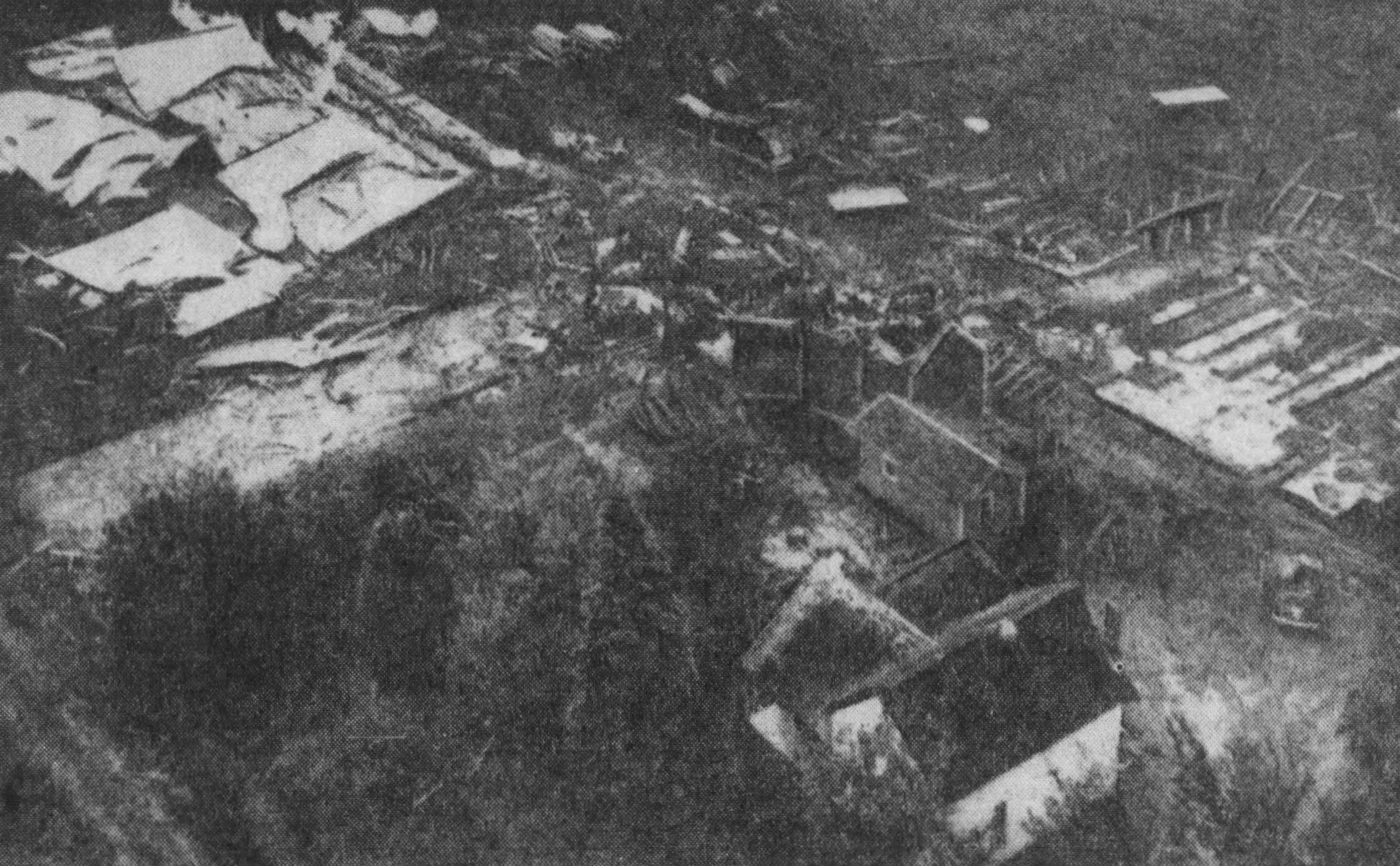
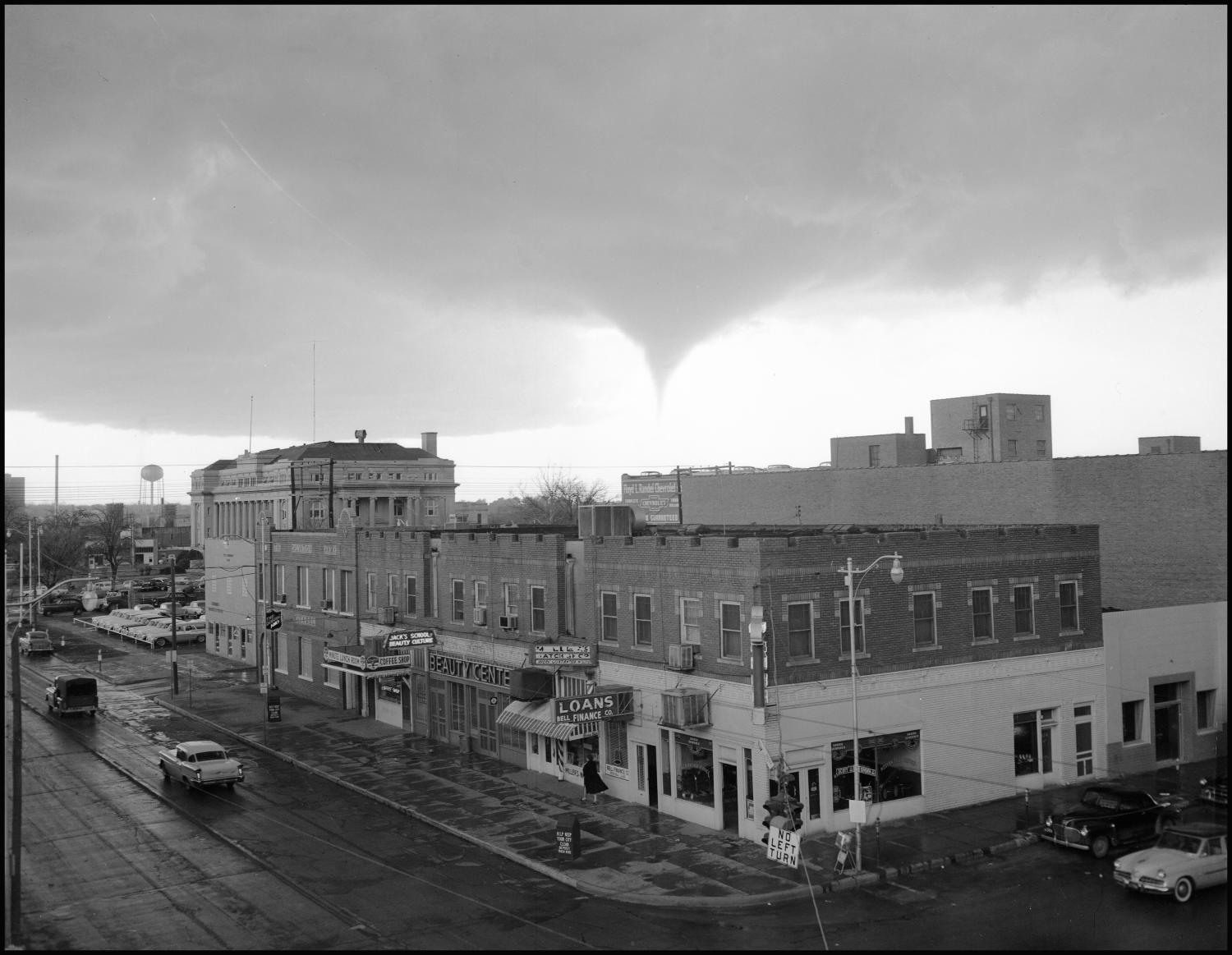
- Clockwise from top: A drill-bit tornado just west of Plum City, Wisconsin as it destroyed a farm on May 24; An aerial photo of Colfax, Wisconsin after an F5 tornado on June 4; An aerial photo of a farm near Chippewa Falls, Wisconsin after an F4 tornado on June 4; An F3 tornado in Wichita Falls, Texas on April 2; A radar scan showing a supercell with a hook-echo near El Dorado, Kansas on June 10; A farmstead in Bareah, Florida after an F4 tornado on April 15.
- Timespan: January 1 - December 11
- Maximum rated tornado: F5 tornado: Colfax, Wisconsin on June 4
- Tornadoes in U.S.: 564
- Damage (U.S.): Unknown
- Fatalities (U.S.): 66
- Fatalities (worldwide): >202

This page documents the notable tornadoes and tornado outbreaks of 1958 worldwide, but primarily in the United States. Strong and destructive tornadoes form most frequently in the United States, China, the Pampas, the European Plain, South Africa, and Bengal, but they can occur almost anywhere under the right conditions. Tornadoes also develop occasionally in southern Canada during the Northern Hemisphere's summer and somewhat regularly at other times of the year across Europe, Asia, and Australia. Tornadic events are often accompanied by other forms of severe weather, including strong thunderstorms, winds, and hail.

== Events ==
Fatal United States tornadoes in 1958
- Approximate touchdown location of killer tornadoes in 1958 Summary of tornadoes: February 26 – Mississippi (8 deaths); February 26 – Mississippi (1 death); February 26 – Mississippi (4 deaths); April 2 – Texas (1 death); April 5 – Illinois (1 death); April 5 – Alabama (1 death); April 22 – South Carolina (1 death); June 4 – Wisconsin (19 deaths); June 4 – Wisconsin (4 deaths); June 4 – Wisconsin (4 deaths); June 10 – Kansas (15 deaths); July 1 – Minnesota (1 death); August 4 – Minnesota (1 death); September 7 – Massachusetts (1 death); October 8 – Missouri (2 deaths); October 8 – Illinois (1 death); October 19 – Florida (1 death); Total fatalities: 66

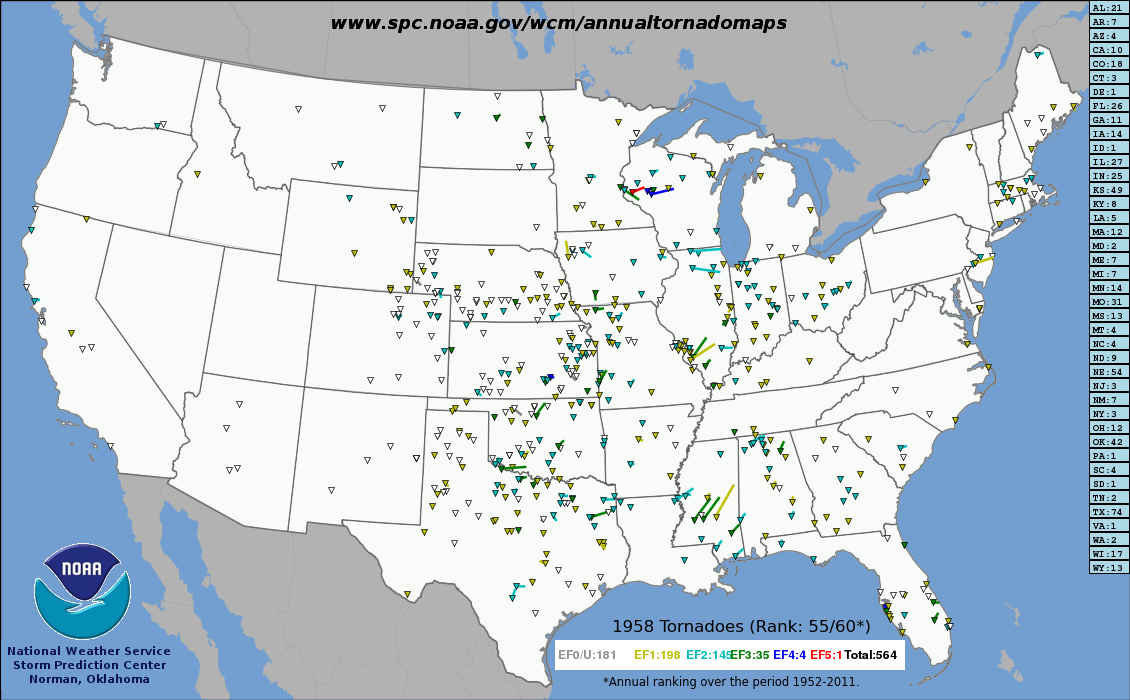
A map showing the tracks of all documented tornadoes across the United States in 1958.

1958 featured widespread tornado activity across the entire United States, with at least 564 tornadoes recorded. States like California, Florida, and Wisconsin were unusually active, with Florida and Wisconsin both having 5 intense to violent tornadoes each. Several strong tornadoes impacted California, causing significant damage, but no casualties.

The most active and deadliest month was June, which featured several violent tornadoes and 43 fatalities, primarily on two days, June 4, and June 10. The year's strongest and deadliest tornado in the United States was an F5 that struck the town of Colfax, Wisconsin on June 4, claiming the lives of 19 and injuring 110 others.

Other notable tornadoes include an F3 tornado that struck Jackson, Mississippi on February 26, claiming 8 lives, an F4 tornado that struck Bareah, Florida on April 15, F4 tornadoes near Chippewa Falls, Wisconsin and Thorp, Wisconsin on June 4, both claiming 4 lives each, and a violent F4 that struck El Dorado, Kansas on June 10, which claimed 15 lives.

The deadliest tornado internationally was an F3+ that struck Hanchuan, China on April 22, which claimed at least 133 lives.

=== United States yearly total ===
Confirmed tornadoes by Fujita rating
FU	F0	F1	F2	F3	F4	F5	Total
0	145	233	145	36	4	1	564

== January ==
There were 11 tornadoes confirmed in the US in January.

=== January 1 (Manitoba) ===
A tornado was confirmed in Amaranth, Manitoba. Damage information is unknown.

=== January 1 ===
A short lived but damaging F1 tornado struck the Buena Vista Trailer village just south of New Port Richey, Florida. The tornado heavily damaged 3 of the 115 trailers, resulting in one woman being injured and needing to be treated for three broken ribs.

=== January 10 ===
A rare F0 tornado hit Crescent City, California. There was only minor damage with no casualties being reported.

=== January 24 ===
An isolated, but strong F2 tornado tore through Cochran, Georgia, injuring 16.

== February ==
There were 20 tornadoes confirmed in the US in February.

=== February 3 ===
A brief, but rare F0 tornado struck Gualala Point Island south of Gualala, California. There were no casualties.

=== February 26–27 ===
FU	F0	F1	F2	F3	F4	F5
0	3	4	5	4	0	0

A destructive and deadly outbreak of 16 tornadoes hit the Southeast. The first tornado to cause casualties on February 26 was a short-lived, but strong F2 tornado that injured two on the south side of Hosston, Louisiana. Three destructive tornadoes then struck Mississippi. The first one was a long-tracked F3 tornado that moved directly through Downtown Jackson, killing eight and 26 injuries on its 69.7 mile path. Just 10 minutes after that tornado touched down, an even longer-tracked F3 tornado touched down further to the east, striking Harrisville, Piney Woods, Walnut Grove, and Madden, killing one and injuring 34 on its 71-mile-path. Further to the south, an F2 tornado pummeled the towns of White Sand, Hillsdale, and Eastern Lumberton, injuring nine.

Later that evening, another F2 tornado tracked through Gulf Hills, Vancleave, and Hurley, Mississippi, injuring one. A catastrophic F3 tornado then tore through the rural Mississippi counties of Perry, Greene, and Wayne, killing four and injuring 20. The final strong tornado of the event took place just before midnight when a brief, but destructive F3 tornado hit Savannah, Tennessee, although there were no casualties. Two weak tornadoes touched down the next day before the outbreak came to an end. In the end, the tornadoes killed 13 and injured 92.

=== February 28 ===
A rare F0 tornado moved through O'Neals, California. There were no casualties.

== March ==
There were 15 tornadoes confirmed in the US in March.

=== March 12 ===
A rare F0 tornado touched down in Madera, California. There were no casualties, but some minor damage did occur.

=== March 28 ===
A rare, strong 200-yard-wide F2 tornado touched down in McKinleyville, California. While there were no casualties, major damage was reported along the 2.0-mile-path.

== April ==
There were 76 tornadoes confirmed in the US in April.

=== April 1–6 ===
FU	F0	F1	F2	F3	F4	F5
0	3	18	6	5	0	0

A tornado outbreak sequence of 32 tornadoes hit areas from California to Virginia. It started with four tornadoes on April 1, including three rare early to late-morning F1 tornadoes that touched down in California. The first one caused considerable damage to the San Francisco International Airport. The second one struck the town of Cortez. the final one struck the southeastern side of Laguna Beach. There were no casualties from the tornadoes. Four tornadoes touched down the next day, all of which caused casualties. A brief, but damaging F1 tornado injured one north of South Union, Kentucky. A large, half-mile wide F1 tornado then hit Fletcher and Cement, Oklahoma, injuring one as well. In Texas, a deadly F3 tornado struck Wichita Falls, killing one and injuring 14. Another F3 tornado hit Stoneburg, injuring one.

After minimal tornado activity from April 3–4, a deadly outbreak of 17 tornadoes struck the Midwest and Alabama on April 5. It started with a long-tracked late-morning F1 tornado that struck Remsen, Eastern Alton, and Western Newkirk, Iowa, injuring one on its 37-mile path. That afternoon, a deadly, long-tracked F3 tornado tore through New Athens, Fayetteville, New Memphis Station, Damiansville, Breese, Hagarstown, and Western Vandalia, Illinois, killing one and injuring eight on its 60.5 mile path. An F1 tornado then injured one in rural Perry County, Missouri. Back in Illinois, another F3 tornado struck Vergennes, the DuQuoin State Fairgrounds in Southern Du Quoin, and Sesser, injuring 11.

As tornado activity wound down in the Midwest that evening, it quickly began to pick up in Alabama. An F2 tornado struck Leighton, Wheeler Darn Village, and Rogersville, killing one and injuring another. Later, another F2 tornado passed through areas just east of the killer tornado, causing mostly heavy tree damage in rural Lawrence and Limestone Counties. Just after midnight on April 6, the final strong F3 tornado of the outbreak sequence tore through Albertville, the west sides of Hustleville, Asbury, and Grove Oak, and Section, injuring one. The outbreak ended later that afternoon when a weak, but damaging F1 tornado moved through Hampton, Virginia, although it caused no casualties.

Overall, the tornadoes killed three and injured 40.

=== April 15 ===
FU	F0	F1	F2	F3	F4	F5
0	0	2	0	2	1	0

An intense, localized outbreak of five tornadoes hit Florida and Georgia. It started with a brief, but violent F4 tornado striking Bereah, Florida (although some experts rated it as an F3 tornado due to poor construction of the structures), injuring seven. Later, an F3 tornado (some experts rate it as an F2 tornado) tore through Northern Anastasia Island, Florida, injuring nine. Another F3 storm then became the most damaging tornado of the day when it moved directly through Anglevillas and Fort Pierce, Florida, injuring 20. Overall, the outbreak injured 36.

=== April 21–22 ===
FU	F0	F1	F2	F3	F4	F5
0	2	7	2	0	0	0

An outbreak of 11 tornadoes impacted the Southern Plains and the Southeast. On April 21, a disastrous, .25-mile-wide F2 tornado hit the Southern Dallas suburbs of Midlothian and Forreston, injuring 18.The next day, an F2 tornado struck Southern Lone Star and Northern Summerton, South Carolina, killing one and injuring another. A brief but destructive F1 tornado then caused major damage just southwest of Downtown West Palm Beach, Florida, injuring three. Further to the south, another brief F1 tornado then struck Downtown Delray Beach, although there were no casualties. In the end, the outbreak killed one and injured 22.

=== April 23–24 ===
FU	F0	F1	F2	F3	F4	F5
0	1	2	3	0	0	0

A small outbreak of five tornadoes hit the Mississippi Valley while a rare tornado struck Washington. Just before midnight on April 23, an isolated F1 tornado damaged the Northwestern St. Louis suburb of Bridgeton, Missouri. The next day, a highly unusual long-tracked F0 tornado tracked 45 miles through rural Walla Walla County, Washington, causing little to no damage. Thousands of miles away, a stronger, long-tracked F2 tornado hit Arlington Plantation, Louisiana, before crossing the Mississippi River into Mississippi and striking the towns of Mayersville and Belzoni, causing major damage on its 58.7-mile-path. Despite the destruction, none of the tornadoes caused any casualties.

== May ==
There were 68 tornadoes confirmed in the US in May. This was also the first time that May produced no tornado-related fatalities in the US since modern records began in 1950.

=== May 15–16 (Poland) ===
FU	F0	F1	F2	F3	F4	F5
2	0	0	0	0	0	0

Two destructive tornadoes hit Rawa Mazowiecka and Nowe Miasto in Poland. There were three fatalities and over 100 injuries.

=== May 22 ===
FU	F0	F1	F2	F3	F4	F5
0	0	1	1	0	0	0

An F2 tornado struck Logan Elm Village, Circleville, and Stoutsville, Ohio, injuring three. Thousands of miles away, an unusual F1 tornado passed over Tule Lake west of Homestead, California with no casualties.

=== May 24–25 ===
FU	F0	F1	F2	F3	F4	F5
0	0	0	2	1	0	0

A farm just west of Plum City, Wisconsin as seen on May 25 after being struck by a tornado.

Three destructive tornadoes struck four states over two days. On May 24, a long-tracked F3 tornado first touched down northeast of Minneapolis in Eastern Hugo, Minnesota. It then tracked 15.1 miles southeastward through the eastern suburbs of Withrow, the west sides of Stillwater, Oak Park Heights, and Bayport, and Northern Lakeland, injuring six. It then crossed the St. Croix River into Wisconsin, where it tracked 44.3 miles, striking the towns of Southern Hudson, Northern River Falls, Lawton, El Paso, Waverly, Exile, and Arkansaw, injuring an additional six before dissipating. In total, the tornado traveled 59.4 miles and injured 12.

April 25 saw two stray, but strong F2 tornadoes. The first one caused heavy damage to Will Rogers World Airport in Southwest Oklahoma City. The second one was brief, but it struck Decatur, Alabama, injuring one. Overall, the three tornadoes injured 13.

=== May 27 – June 2 ===
FU	F0	F1	F2	F3	F4	F5
0	3	7	11	2	0	0

A modest outbreak sequence of 23 tornadoes hit areas from California and Illinois. The first major tornado occurred on May 30 when an F3 tornado tore through rural Benson County, North Dakota. Right at midnight on May 31, an F1 tornado injured one in Kampville, Missouri north of St. Louis. Later, an F2 tornado injured two in Rolling Prairie, Indiana. In Kansas, an F3 tornado hit areas northwest of Labette. June 1 saw a rare F2 tornado track 15 miles through Valley Ford and Fredericks, California, causing major damage, but no casualties before dissipating southwest of Roseland and Santa Rosa. The final tornado of the outbreak was an F1 tornado in Columbia, Alabama. In the end, the outbreak sequence injured three.

== June ==
There were 128 tornadoes confirmed in the US in June.

=== June 3–4 ===
FU	F0	F1	F2	F3	F4	F5
0	2	4	3	1	2	1

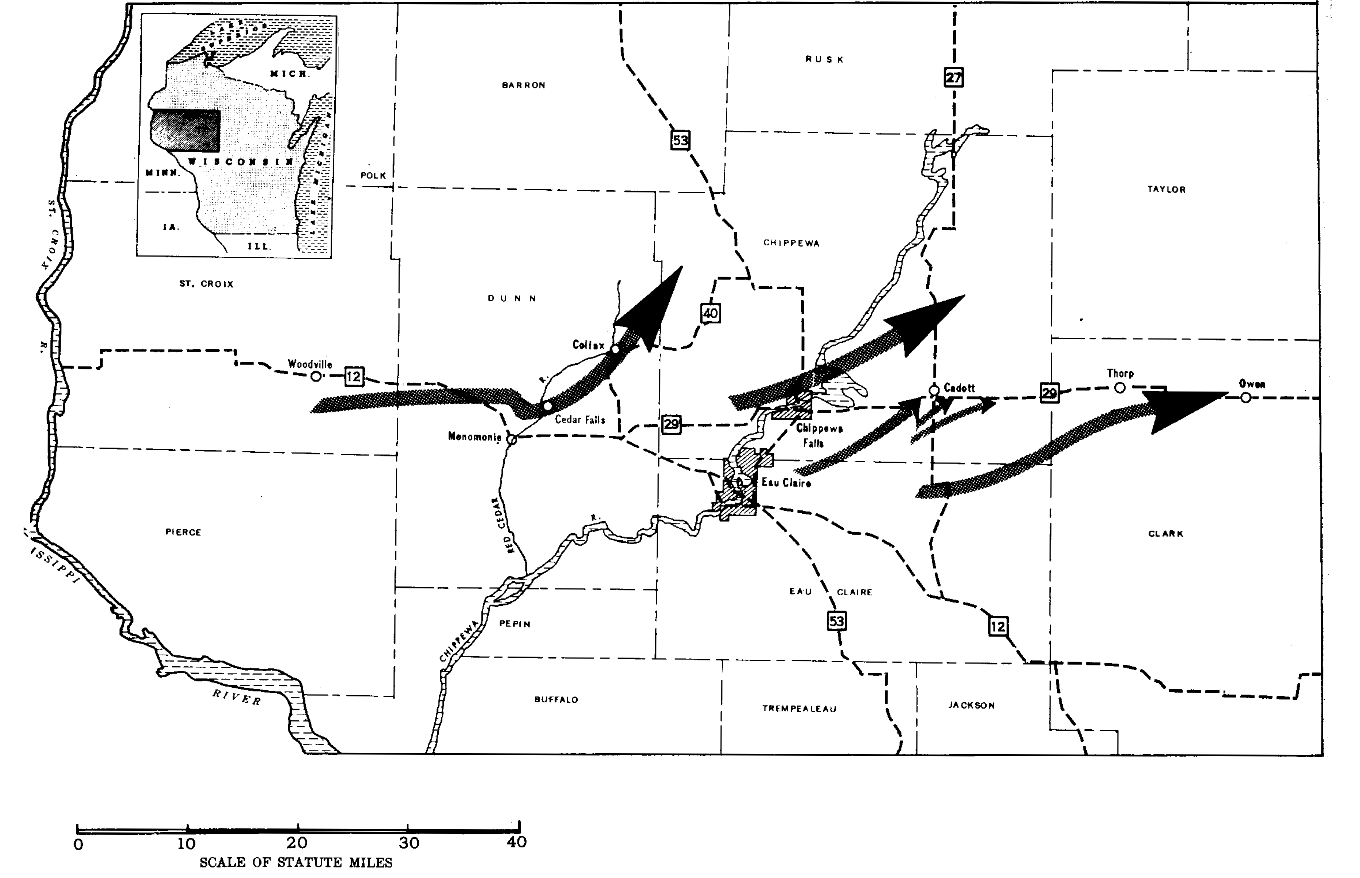
A map showing significant tornadoes across Wisconsin's Lower Chippewa Valley on June 4th.

A violent outbreak of 13 tornadoes struck the Upper Midwest. On June 4, large F2 tornado passed through Avon and Collegeville, Minnesota just west of St. Cloud, injuring two. At the same time, a brief F1 tornado injured one west of St. Martin, Minnesota. The worst tornadoes later occurred in Wisconsin. A large, violent, and long-tracked F5 tornado which would rip a path through St Croix, and Dunn Counties in Wisconsin, primarily striking the town of Colfax, killing 19 and injuring 110+. Another large, violent, 600 yd (550 m) wide F4 tornado then hit Chippewa Falls northeast of Eau Claire, killing four and injuring 50. After that, an F3 tornado injured three in Cadott. An F2 tornado then touched down and caused mostly tree damage, although some barns were destroyed, in rural Rusk and Sawyer Counties. The final tornado, another violent, long tracked, half-mile wide F4 tornado, struck Fall Creek before moving through rural Eau Claire, Clark, and Marathon Counties, killing four and injuring three.

In the end, the outbreak killed 28, all in Northwestern Wisconsin, injured 133, and caused $83.275 million (1957 USD) in damage.

=== June 10 ===
FU	F0	F1	F2	F3	F4	F5
0	2	1	1	0	1	0

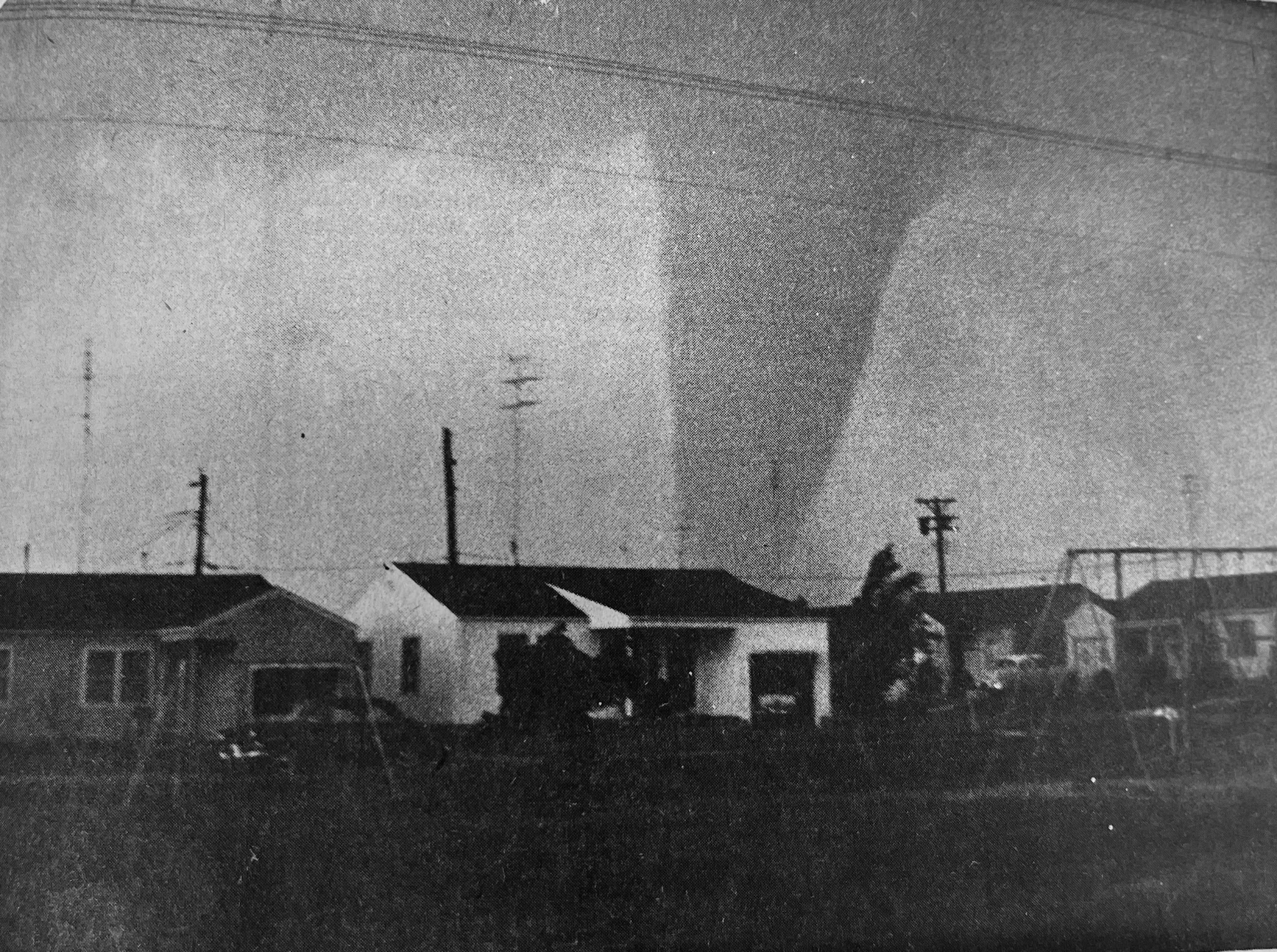
A large F4 tornado approaching El Dorado, Kansas.

A small, but destructive outbreak of five tornadoes impacted Iowa, Missouri, and Kansas. The only tornado to cause casualties was a violent F4 tornado (which may have reached F5 intensity) that struck El Dorado, Kansas, damaging or destroying numerous brand new homes, including some that were leveled and completely swept away, leaving only a bare slab. A total of 15 people were killed and five (Grazulis says 50) others were injured. An F2 tornado also caused heavy damage in the Northwestern St. Louis suburb of O'Fallon, Missouri.

== July ==
There were 121 confirmed tornadoes in the US in July.

=== July 1–2 ===
FU	F0	F1	F2	F3	F4	F5
0	6	6	2	0	0	0

A deadly F1 tornado struck Leander Lake, Minnesota, killing one and injuring two. Five other tornadoes touched down in Oklahoma, Colorado, and Nebraska, including an F2 tornado that hit Lodgepole and Western Sedgwick, Nebraska. The next day saw eight more tornadoes with the worst being an F2 tornado that caused major damage and injured two in Billings, Montana. Four F0 tornadoes touched down in Nebraska as well along with three F1 tornadoes in Maine.

=== July 10–11 ===
FU	F0	F1	F2	F3	F4	F5
0	4	12	6	1	0	0

A damaging outbreak of 22 tornadoes struck the Great Plains, Great Lakes, and New England. The first tornado of the outbreak was a weak F1 tornado that hit Panama, Nebraska. Another F1 tornado caused major damage in Oakwood, Illinois. The next day, the first F2 tornado of the outbreak briefly touched down northwest of Watson, Kansas. Later, a long-tracked F2 tornado struck Bennington, Maple Grove, and West Salem, Illinois, injuring two. Later in Massachusetts, an F2 tornado hit Millers Falls. Another F2 tornado hit areas northwest of Bedford. The worst tornado, which was also rated F2, then touched down in Western Cincinnati before crossing the Ohio River and striking Ludlow, Kentucky, injuring eight. The final strong tornado, which was also the strongest as it was rated F3, of the outbreak then struck areas southeast of Charleston, Illinois while moving in an odd southwest direction, injuring three. In the end, the outbreak injured 12.

== August ==
There were 46 tornadoes confirmed in the US in August.

=== August 4 ===
FU	F0	F1	F2	F3	F4	F5
0	0	2	0	0	0	0

An F1 tornado killed one and injured two in Lucan, Minnesota. A brief F1 tornado also touched down east of Madison, Nebraska, causing no casualties, but still doing considerable damage.

=== August 7 ===
An isolated, but strong F2 tornado moved through Northwestern Milwaukee, injuring four.

== September ==
There were 24 tornadoes confirmed in the US in September.

=== September 6–7 ===
FU	F0	F1	F2	F3	F4	F5
0	2	1	1	1	0	0

Five scattered tornadoes touched down across the Great Plains and New England. On September 6, an isolated, but strong F3 tornado caused considerable damage south of Valley City, North Dakota. The next day, an F2 tornado injured two northwest of Willington, Connecticut. Later, a brief, weak, but surprisingly deadly F0 tornado killed one and injured another in Northwestern Duxbury, Massachusetts. Overall, the tornadoes killed one and injured three.

== October ==
There were 9 tornadoes confirmed in the US in October.

=== October 8–9 ===
FU	F0	F1	F2	F3	F4	F5
0	1	0	2	1	0	0

Four tornadoes struck the Midwest over a two-day period. On October 8, an F3 tornado struck Oxford, Missouri, killing two and injuring seven. A long-tracked F2 tornado then tore an 81-mile path of destruction through Davis, Harrison, Roscoe, Hunter, Chemung, Harvard, Greenwood, Ringwood, Pistakke Highlands, Fox Lake, Ingleside Shore, Round Lake Heights, Round Lake Beach, Venetian Village, Grandwood Park, Gurnee and Northwestern Waukegan, Illinois, killing one. The next day in Wisconsin, a brief, but strong F2 tornado caused mainly tree damage west of Burkhardt. The final tornado was a weak F0 tornado over the Yahara River southwest of Lake Windsor, causing little to no damage. In the end, the small outbreak killed three and injured seven.

=== October 19 ===
FU	F0	F1	F2	F3	F4	F5
0	0	1	0	1	0	0

Two damaging early-morning tornadoes touched down in Florida. The first tornado was an F1 tornado that caused considerable damage in Southern Osprey. Just over five hours later, a large, .25 miles (0.40 km) wide F3 tornado caused major damage in Pahokee, Canal Point, and Indiantown, killing one and injuring 24.

=== October 31 ===
An isolated, but strong F3 tornado struck Snead Island as well as the Palmetto Historic District in Palmetto, Florida, causing major damage and injuring four.

== November ==
There were 45 tornadoes confirmed in the US in November.

=== November 13–17 ===
FU	F0	F1	F2	F3	F4	F5
0	7	11	20	5	0	0

A large tornado outbreak sequence struck the Great Plains and the Mississippi Valley with 34 of the 43 tornadoes from the outbreak occurring on November 17, although the first tornado to cause casualties happened on November 14. An F2 tornado injured one northwest of Pace, Louisiana on that day.

Tornado activity on November 17 began early that morning when a brief, but strong F2 tornado touched down northwest of Curranville, Kansas. Later in Texas, another F2 tornado struck Weinert, injuring seven. An F1 tornado impacted Throckmorton, injuring four. An F2 tornado then injured one in Olney.

Stronger tornadoes then began to impact Oklahoma. A long-tracked F3 tornado impacted Loveland and Walters, injuring four on its 65.8 mile path. Another long-tracked F3 tornado then struck the towns of Fairmont, Garber, Western Billings, and Blackwell, causing major damage. Later, an F1 tornado injured four in Dickson. A destructive F3 tornado struck Bowlegs and Sportsman Lake, injuring 15.

More tornado activity then occurred in Kansas. A .5 mi (0.80 km) wide F3 tornado passed through Grenola, Kansas, causing major damage. Later, an F2 tornado caused major damage in rural Leavenworth County. Another damaging F2 tornado occurred just northeast of Pomona.

Just before noon, tornadoes began to touch down in Missouri. A large, long-tracked F3 tornado caused major destruction in Moundville and Nevada, injuring one. That afternoon, an F2 tornado caused heavy damage in Galt. Another F2 tornado then damaged Blue Ridge.

The final tornado of the outbreak was an F2 tornado that caused heavy damage in Marcus, Lambert, and Bismarck, Arkansas. In the end, the outbreak caused no fatalities, but there were 37 injuries.

=== November 28 ===
FU	F0	F1	F2	F3	F4	F5
0	0	0	2	0	0	0

Two short-lived, but destructive F2 tornadoes (possibly from the same storm) hit Georgia that afternoon. The first one caused heavy damage in the town of Listonia. The second one was even more destructive as it moved directly through Chauncey, injuring one.

== December ==
There was 1 tornado confirmed in the US in December.

=== December 11 ===
The only tornado in the United States, during the month, occurred on this day, when a brief, but damaging F1 tornado injured one north of South Sarasota, Florida.

=== December 28 (United Kingdom) ===
A tornado, rated F1/T2 by the European Severe Storms Laboratory struck Colyford, England. It was noted that a damage survey was conducted by a “severe weather expert” with no further information given.

== See also ==
- Tornado
  - Tornadoes by year
  - Tornado records
  - Tornado climatology
  - Tornado myths
- List of tornado outbreaks
  - List of F5 and EF5 tornadoes
  - List of North American tornadoes and tornado outbreaks
  - List of 21st-century Canadian tornadoes and tornado outbreaks
  - List of European tornadoes and tornado outbreaks
  - List of tornadoes and tornado outbreaks in Asia
  - List of Southern Hemisphere tornadoes and tornado outbreaks
  - List of tornadoes striking downtown areas
  - List of tornadoes with confirmed satellite tornadoes
- Tornado intensity
  - Fujita scale
  - Enhanced Fujita scale
