= Edwards County Community Unit School District 1 =

School district in Edwards County, Illinois, United States

Location
- Edwards County, Illinois United States

District information
- Type: unified school district
- Grades: PK-12
- Superintendent: David Cowger

Students and staff
- Students: 1,019
- District mascot: Lion
- Colors: ECHS Red & Black AGS Purple & Gold WSGS Maroon & White

Other information
- Website: http://edwardscountyschools.org

Edwards County Community Unit School District 1 is a unified school district headquartered and almost completely located within the city lines in Albion, the county seat of the county the district chiefly serves, Edwards County. The district also serves small portions of several adjacent counties, such as Richland County Wayne County, Wabash County, and White County, Illinois. Albion is located in the state of Illinois. Serving a student body of approximately 1,000, the district is associated with three schools: two are grade schools, and one is a senior high school.

Albion Grade School is one of those two grade schools, located in the city for which it is named and serving approximately two-thirds of the district's students ranging from prekindergarten though grade eight under two principals: Carrie Wells (K-5) and Kris Duncan (6-8) A second grade school is located in the northern reaches of the county, and is known as West Salem Grade School, the smaller of the two grade schools. As its name suggests, it is located in the village of West Salem. Likewise, West Salem Grade School tutors students from prekindergarten to grade eight under supervision of principal Mark Beckel.

Graduates of both grade schools move towards Edwards County High School for the last branch of their education; as implied, the high school educates those in grades nine though twelve. The high school is governed by principal Dale Schmittler; the district superintendent is also David Cowger.

As for clubs, both grade schools have a student council. Albion Grade School, however, also sports a club centered on Christianity. In the high school, there is a much broader variety of clubs to choose from: member clubs include various clubs centered on creative arts, career advancement, and academic classes, although there is also a National Honor Society, a local chapter of the FFA, a student council, and a weight lifting club.

As of the 2006–07 school year results of ISAT testing, the grade average of students in grades three though eight and grade eleven generally hovered around the state average.
