= 2010 Billings tornado =

EF2 tornado in Billings, Montana, United States

Coordinates: 45.800°N 108.478°W

2010 Billings, Montana tornado
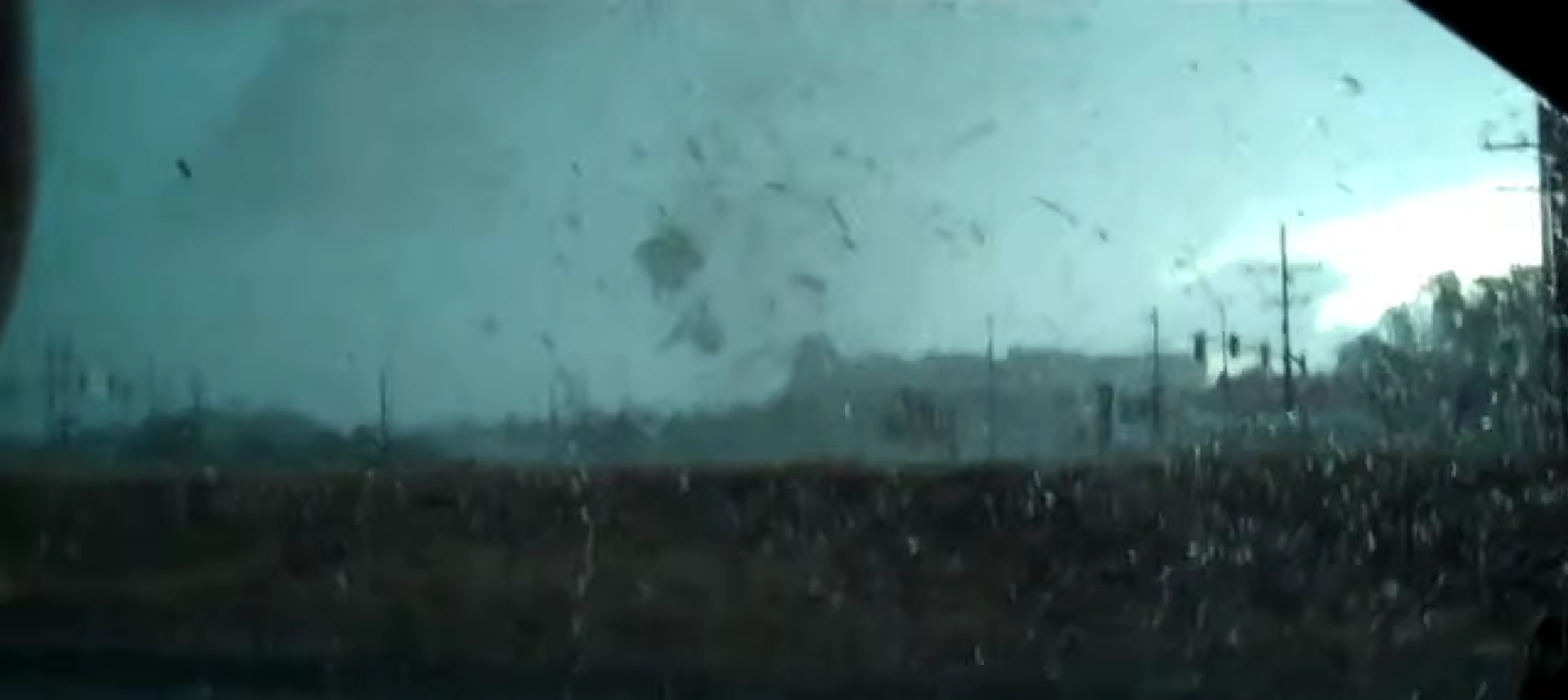
- The tornado shortly after formation

Meteorological history
- Formed: June 20, 2010 3:24 p.m. MST (UTC−07:00)
- Dissipated: June 20, 2010 3:36 p.m. MST (UTC−07:00)
- Duration: 12 minutes

EF2 tornado
- on the Enhanced Fujita scale
- Highest winds: 120–135 mph (193–217 km/h)

Overall effects
- Damage: $30 million (2010 USD)
- Areas affected: Yellowstone County, Montana (part of a larger outbreak)
- Part of the tornado outbreaks of 2010

On Sunday, June 20, 2010 (Father's Day), a destructive EF2 tornado struck the city of Billings, Montana. The tornado, known as the 2010 Father's Day tornado, was on the ground for about 12 minutes and took the roof off the Rimrock Auto Arena at MetraPark (then named the First Interstate Arena Metra Park), a 10,000 seat arena, and heavily damaged numerous businesses. The storm was accompanied by high winds and a major hail storm that caused severe damage and flash flooding in the Heights and surrounding areas of the city. It was the first time since 1958 that a significant tornado struck the Downtown Billings area.

== Meteorological synopsis ==
An unsettled pattern continued across a large part of the US, with widespread isolated tornadoes across various parts of the Plains states.

The Storm Prediction Center in Norman, Oklahoma had issued a severe thunderstorm watch for south-central Montana, including Yellowstone County, at 1:55 pm CDT on June 20, in anticipation of active severe weather throughout the region. Strong southwesterly flow aloft combined with a moderately unstable air mass created conditions favorable for producing severe thunderstorms, and potentially tornadoes.

A supercell thunderstorm moved through the Billings area in the late afternoon.

== Tornado summary ==
At approximately 4:24 pm MDT, a tornado touched down near the intersection of Lake Elmo drive and Main Street. It damaged several buildings, including tearing roofs off of multiple structures. It also downed several power poles and billboards, and uprooted multiple trees. The tornado moved south, where it struck the Rimrock Auto Arena at MetraPark, tearing off a large portion of the roof and doing nearly $27 million worth of damage to the arena. The tornado lofted debris and deposited it as far as one mile from the damage path. After approximately 12 minutes on the ground, the tornado dissipated over the arena. The storm then moved northeast, producing numerous funnel clouds, but no further touchdowns.

== Aftermath ==
The damage survey revealed damage from the tornado consistent with wind speeds of 120–135 mph (193–217 km/h), garnering a rating of EF2. It was the strongest tornado to strike the Billings area in over 50 years. Despite the major damage in the urban area, only some minor injuries were reported.

== See also ==
- List of North American tornadoes and tornado outbreaks
