= Samsville, Illinois =

- Unincorporated community
- Location within Illinois Location within the United States
- Coordinates: 38°29′23″N 88°03′27″W
- Country: United States
- State: Illinois
- County: Edwards
- Elevation: 476 ft (145 m)
- Time zone: UTC-6 (Central (CST))
  - Summer (DST): UTC-5 (CDT)
- Area code: 618
- GNIS feature ID: 417919

Samsville is an unincorporated community in northern Edwards County, Illinois, United States. Samsville is located on Illinois Route 130.

== History ==
One of the first families to make a permanent home in Edwards County was Lot Sams. He along with Thomas Carney, John Bell and Isaac Greathouse came in 1815. In 1821, Lot Sams settled in section 25.

Lot had been a resident of Kentucky and Tennessee before coming to the state of Illinois with his family. Pack horses carried their belongings all the way to this state.

By thrift, energy, and endurance, Lot Sams had accumulated a considerable amount of property, and the little hamlet of six or seven families (at the time) in Samsville, in Shelby precinct, has the honor of bearing his name.

In 1864 a post office was established there. The old Shiloh Church was established east about one-quarter of a mile with a cemetery. Two other cemeteries, Samsville (or Potter), and Ebenezer are located near Samsville.

In June 2006, strong straight-line winds destroyed the Ebenezer United Methodist Church that was located by the Cemetery. The church was rebuilt in 2007 on the same location as the old church.

In the early 1960s Curma Hoeszle purchased the Samsville store in Samsville. He also entered into business with Glen Taylor operating the Southern Illinois Tractor & Machine Salvage Company. This was located across the road from the Samsville store. These businesses continued till his death in the 1980s.
