= Bennington, Illinois =

- Unincorporated community
- Location within Illinois Location within the United States
- Coordinates: 38°31′27″N 88°07′53″W
- Country: United States
- State: Illinois
- County: Edwards
- Elevation: 417 ft (127 m)
- Time zone: UTC-6 (Central (CST))
  - Summer (DST): UTC-5 (CDT)
- Area code: 618
- GNIS feature ID: 404178

Bennington is an unincorporated community in Edwards County, Illinois, United States. Bennington is 6.5 miles (10.5 km) west of West Salem.

== Geography ==
Bennington's coordinates are 38°31′27″N 88°07′53″W, and the average elevation of the place is 127 meters (417 feet).
