= Maple Grove, Illinois =

- Unincorporated community
- Location within Illinois Location within the United States
- Coordinates: 38°32′00″N 88°05′38″W
- Country: United States
- State: Illinois
- County: Edwards
- Elevation: 443 ft (135 m)
- Time zone: UTC-6 (Central (CST))
  - Summer (DST): UTC-5 (CDT)
- Area code: 618
- GNIS feature ID: 422935

Maple Grove is an unincorporated community in Edwards County, Illinois, United States. Maple Grove is 4.5 miles (7.2 km) west-northwest of West Salem.
