= Edwards County, Illinois =

County in Illinois, United States

- County
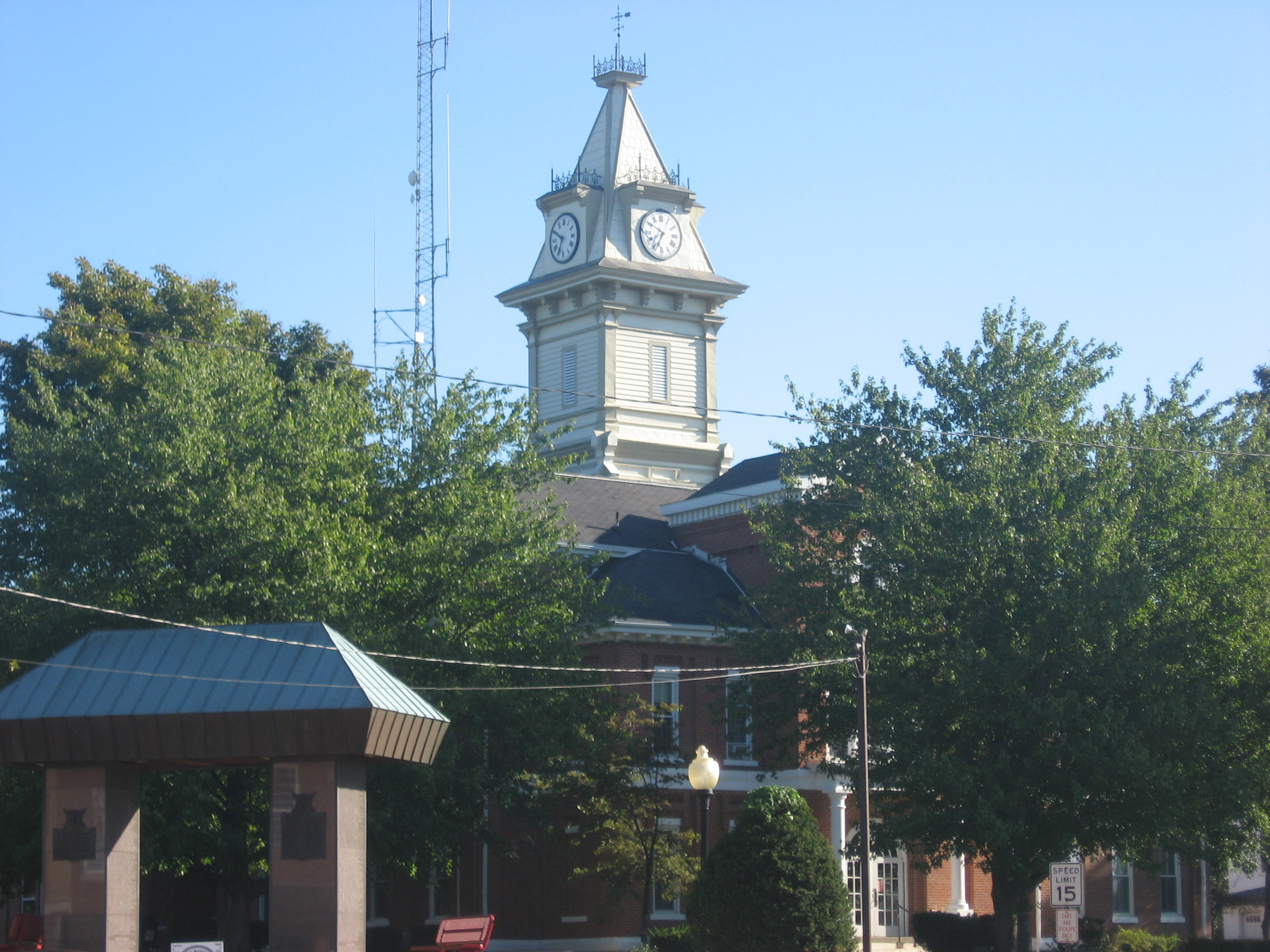
- Edwards County Courthouse in Albion

- Location within the U.S. state of Illinois
- Coordinates: 38°25′N 88°04′W
- Country: United States
- State: Illinois
- Founded: 1814
- Named for: Ninian Edwards
- Seat: Albion
- Largest city: Albion

Area
  - Total: 223 sq mi (580 km^{2})
  - Land: 222 sq mi (570 km^{2})
  - Water: 0.3 sq mi (0.78 km^{2}) 0.1%

Population (2020)
  - Total: 6,245
  - Estimate (2025): 5,898 ▼
  - Density: 28.1/sq mi (10.9/km^{2})
- Time zone: UTC−6 (Central)
  - Summer (DST): UTC−5 (CDT)
- Congressional district: 12th

Edwards County is a county located in the U.S. state of Illinois. As of the 2020 census, the population was 6,245. Its county seat is Albion.

== History ==
Edwards County was named for Ninian Edwards, the governor of the Illinois Territory, and, later, governor of Illinois.

Edwards County is subdivided into "Road Districts", rather than "Townships" as in most Illinois counties. Pursuant to the Land Ordinance of 1785, the Northwest Territory (including Illinois) was surveyed and mostly organized into townships that are six miles square; but Edwards County was settled prior to that survey, and its pre-existing Road Districts do not generally correspond with the survey's townships.

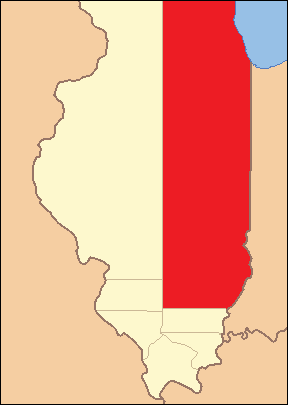
Edwards County, when it was created in 1815 from Gallatin and Madison Counties, extended north to Lake Michigan.

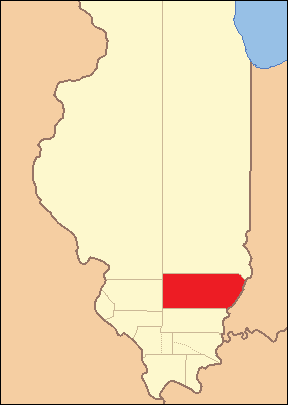
The county between 1816 and 1819. Clark and White Counties were created from Edwards and Gallatin Counties.

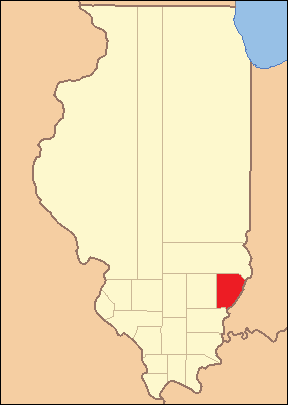
The county between 1819 and 1821. At this point Crawford County was split off from Edwards, and Wayne Counties.

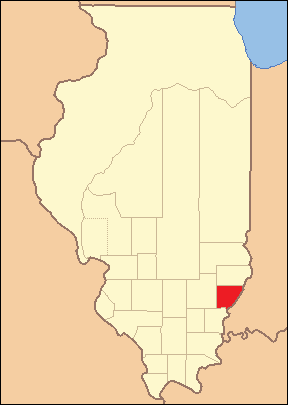
Edwards between 1821 and 1824

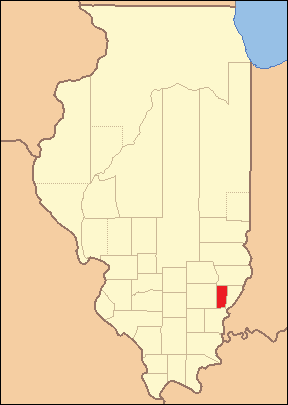
Edwards in 1824, reduced to its current size by the creation of Wabash County

== Geography ==
According to the U.S. Census Bureau, the county has a total area of 223 square miles (580 km^{2}), of which 222 square miles (570 km^{2}) is land and 0.3 square miles (0.78 km^{2}) (0.1%) is water. It is the fourth-smallest county in Illinois by area.

When Edwards County was formed in 1814, it comprised nearly half of the State of Illinois. New counties were formed from it until, in 1824, it assumed its present form from the creation of Wabash County. The two are the fourth and fifth smallest counties in Illinois.

Edwards County is separated from Wabash County by the Bonpas Creek.

=== Climate and weather ===
Albion, Illinois

Climate chart (precipitation, max. and min. temperature)
J	F	M	A	M	J	J	A	S	O	N	D
2.6 37 21	2.7 44 25	4.3 55 35	5.1 66 45	4.6 76 55	4.2 86 64	3.9 89 68	3.4 88 66	2.9 81 58	3.4 70 47	4.3 54 36	3.5 42 26
- █ Average max. and min. temperatures in °F
- █ Precipitation totals in inches
- Source: The Weather Channel
Metric conversion
J	F	M	A	M	J	J	A	S	O	N	D
65 3 −6	69 7 −4	109 13 2	130 19 7	117 24 13	106 30 18	98 32 20	87 31 19	73 27 14	85 21 8	109 12 2	89 6 −3
- █ Average max. and min. temperatures in °C
- █ Precipitation totals in mm

In recent years, average temperatures in the county seat of Albion have ranged from a low of 21 °F (−6 °C) in January to a high of 89 °F (32 °C) in July, although a record low of −20 °F (−29 °C) was recorded in January 1982 and a record high of 109 °F (43 °C) was recorded in July 1954. Average monthly precipitation ranged from 2.57 inches (65 mm) in January to 5.13 inches (130 mm) in April.

=== Major highways ===
- Illinois Route 1
- Illinois Route 15
- Illinois Route 130

=== Adjacent counties ===
- Richland County (north)
- Wabash County (east)
- White County (south)
- Wayne County (west)

== Demographics ==
Historical population
Census	Pop.	Note	%±
1820	3,444		—
1830	1,649		−52.1%
1840	3,070		86.2%
1850	3,524		14.8%
1860	5,454		54.8%
1870	7,565		38.7%
1880	8,597		13.6%
1890	9,444		9.9%
1900	10,345		9.5%
1910	10,049		−2.9%
1920	9,431		−6.1%
1930	8,303		−12.0%
1940	8,974		8.1%
1950	9,056		0.9%
1960	7,940		−12.3%
1970	7,090		−10.7%
1980	7,961		12.3%
1990	7,440		−6.5%
2000	6,971		−6.3%
2010	6,721		−3.6%
2020	6,245		−7.1%
2025 (est.)	5,898	▼	−5.6%
U.S. Decennial Census; 1790-1960 1900-1990; 1990-2000 2010-2017

2000 census age pyramid for Edwards County

=== 2020 census ===
As of the 2020 census, the county had a population of 6,245, and the median age was 43.6 years; 22.9% of residents were under the age of 18 and 21.8% were 65 years of age or older, and for every 100 females there were 95.0 males, while for every 100 females age 18 and over there were 95.3 males age 18 and over.

The racial makeup of the county was 96.4% White, 0.4% Black or African American, 0.1% American Indian and Alaska Native, 0.3% Asian, 0.1% Native Hawaiian and Pacific Islander, 0.3% from some other race, and 2.3% from two or more races, and Hispanic or Latino residents of any race comprised 1.0% of the population.

Less than 0.1% of residents lived in urban areas, while 100.0% lived in rural areas.

There were 2,694 households in the county, of which 27.8% had children under the age of 18 living in them; 50.2% were married-couple households, 19.3% were households with a male householder and no spouse or partner present, and 23.6% were households with a female householder and no spouse or partner present; about 31.1% of all households were made up of individuals and 15.9% had someone living alone who was 65 years of age or older.

There were 3,041 housing units, of which 11.4% were vacant; among occupied housing units, 80.0% were owner-occupied and 20.0% were renter-occupied; the homeowner vacancy rate was 1.4% and the rental vacancy rate was 7.2%.

=== Racial and ethnic composition ===
Edwards County, Illinois – Racial and ethnic composition Note: the US Census treats Hispanic/Latino as an ethnic category. This table excludes Latinos from the racial categories and assigns them to a separate category. Hispanics/Latinos may be of any race.
Race / Ethnicity (NH = Non-Hispanic)	Pop 1980	Pop 1990	Pop 2000	Pop 2010	Pop 2020	% 1980	% 1990	% 2000	% 2010	% 2020
White alone (NH)	7,919	7,381	6,869	6,555	5,994	99.47%	99.21%	98.54%	97.53%	95.98%
Black or African American alone (NH)	2	6	10	30	16	0.03%	0.08%	0.14%	0.45%	0.26%
Native American or Alaska Native alone (NH)	7	8	6	8	8	0.09%	0.11%	0.09%	0.12%	0.13%
Asian alone (NH)	8	14	25	21	21	0.10%	0.19%	0.36%	0.31%	0.34%
Native Hawaiian or Pacific Islander alone (NH)	x	x	3	0	4	x	x	0.04%	0.00%	0.06%
Other race alone (NH)	0	1	3	1	11	0.00%	0.01%	0.04%	0.01%	0.18%
Mixed race or Multiracial (NH)	x	x	23	47	128	x	x	0.33%	0.70%	2.05%
Hispanic or Latino (any race)	25	30	32	59	63	0.31%	0.40%	0.46%	0.88%	1.01%
Total	7,961	7,440	6,971	6,721	6,245	100.00%	100.00%	100.00%	100.00%	100.00%

=== 2010 census ===
As of the 2010 United States census, there were 6,721 people, 2,840 households, and 1,926 families residing in the county. The population density was 30.2 inhabitants per square mile (11.7/km^{2}). There were 3,187 housing units at an average density of 14.3 per square mile (5.5/km^{2}). The racial makeup of the county was 98.0% white, 0.4% black or African American, 0.3% Asian, 0.1% American Indian, 0.3% from other races, and 0.8% from two or more races. Those of Hispanic or Latino origin made up 0.9% of the population. In terms of ancestry, 26.8% were German, 22.4% were English, 13.3% were American, and 8.4% were Irish.

Of the 2,840 households, 28.9% had children under the age of 18 living with them, 54.8% were married couples living together, 8.3% had a female householder with no husband present, 32.2% were non-families, and 28.5% of all households were made up of individuals. The average household size was 2.35 and the average family size was 2.86. The median age was 42.7 years.

The median income for a household in the county was $40,430 and the median income for a family was $51,337. Males had a median income of $40,183 versus $27,295 for females. The per capita income for the county was $21,113. About 10.6% of families and 12.2% of the population were below the poverty line, including 17.1% of those under age 18 and 12.3% of those age 65 or over.

== Communities ==
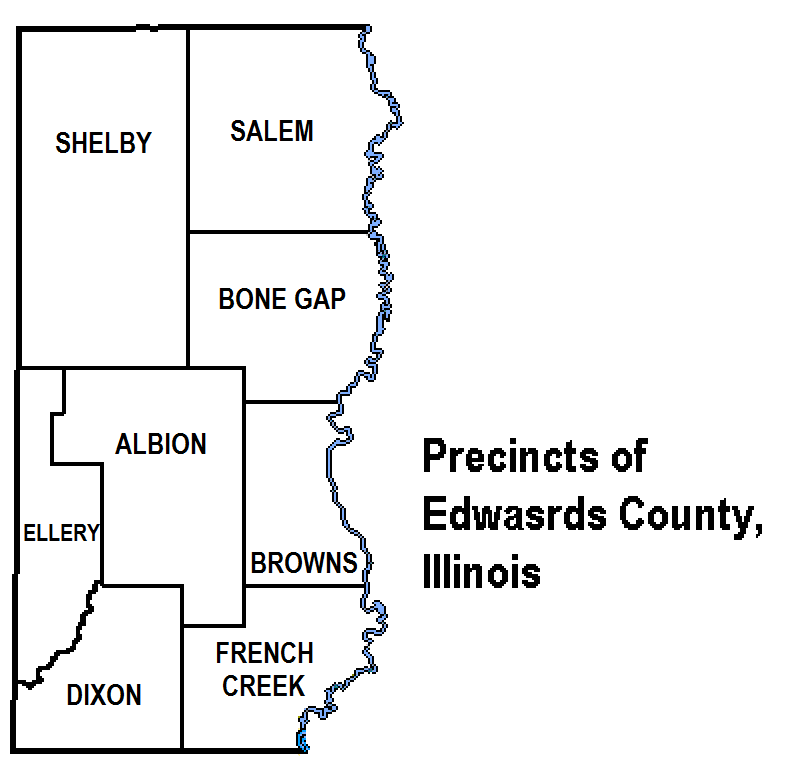
Precincts of Edwards County

=== Cities ===
- Albion (seat)
- Grayville (Partially in White County)

=== Villages ===
- Bone Gap
- Browns
- West Salem

=== Unincorporated communities ===
- Bennington
- Black
- Ellery
- Maple Grove
- Samsville

=== Precincts ===
Edwards County is divided into 12 election precincts:

- Albion No. 1
- Albion No. 2
- Albion No. 3
- Bone Gap
- Browns
- Dixon
- Ellery
- French Creek
- Salem No. 1
- Salem No. 2
- Shelby No. 1
- Shelby No. 2

== Politics ==
Edwards County is one of the most consistently Republican counties in the nation. It has voted for the Republican candidate in all Presidential elections from 1856 to present, except in 1912 when the party was divided and Theodore Roosevelt won the county as the “Bull Moose” Progressive candidate. In the last five Presidential elections no Democratic candidate has reached 34 percent of the county's vote. Edwards County also holds the distinction of having the lowest percentage of any Illinois county of votes for governor Pat Quinn, a Democrat, in his failed 2014 reelection bid. Quinn lost 101 of the 102 counties in Illinois, capturing only 13.7% of the vote in Edwards County. In his three latest runs for president, Donald Trump has won the county decisively with a near 70 point margin of victory each time. The last Democrat to win the county was Andrew Jackson in 1832.

United States presidential election results for Edwards County, Illinois
Year	Republican		Democratic		Third party(ies)	
Year	No.	%	No.	%	No.	%
1892	1,350	62.59%	677	31.39%	130	6.03%
1896	1,572	63.95%	852	34.66%	34	1.38%
1900	1,577	64.18%	823	33.50%	57	2.32%
1904	1,610	67.28%	595	24.86%	188	7.86%
1908	1,614	64.48%	747	29.84%	142	5.67%
1912	817	34.00%	650	27.05%	936	38.95%
1916	2,885	65.39%	1,389	31.48%	138	3.13%
1920	3,002	79.21%	742	19.58%	46	1.21%
1924	2,750	69.59%	1,047	26.49%	155	3.92%
1928	2,861	74.78%	950	24.83%	15	0.39%
1932	2,203	52.25%	1,956	46.39%	57	1.35%
1936	2,813	55.16%	2,211	43.35%	76	1.49%
1940	3,361	64.86%	1,770	34.16%	51	0.98%
1944	3,016	70.96%	1,197	28.16%	37	0.87%
1948	2,491	66.07%	1,206	31.99%	73	1.94%
1952	3,502	75.01%	1,162	24.89%	5	0.11%
1956	3,339	73.38%	1,210	26.59%	1	0.02%
1960	3,291	69.36%	1,446	30.47%	8	0.17%
1964	2,262	53.19%	1,991	46.81%	0	0.00%
1968	2,633	63.68%	1,095	26.48%	407	9.84%
1972	3,017	73.93%	1,055	25.85%	9	0.22%
1976	2,379	58.51%	1,648	40.53%	39	0.96%
1980	2,556	68.14%	1,041	27.75%	154	4.11%
1984	2,778	72.25%	1,057	27.49%	10	0.26%
1988	2,212	64.12%	1,218	35.30%	20	0.58%
1992	1,601	45.07%	1,299	36.57%	652	18.36%
1996	1,613	51.98%	1,089	35.10%	401	12.92%
2000	2,212	67.85%	978	30.00%	70	2.15%
2004	2,412	71.70%	930	27.65%	22	0.65%
2008	2,137	63.56%	1,140	33.91%	85	2.53%
2012	2,405	74.50%	754	23.36%	69	2.14%
2016	2,778	83.57%	434	13.06%	112	3.37%
2020	2,833	84.12%	488	14.49%	47	1.40%
2024	2,794	84.80%	457	13.87%	44	1.34%

In other positions the county has been not been consistently Republican for as long, but nevertheless has been so for many years. The last Democratic Senatorial candidate it backed was Alan J. Dixon in 1986 and the last Democratic gubernatorial candidate it supported was Glenn Poshard, who carried all of Southern Illinois in his failed 1998 bid. Edwards County lies in Illinois's 15th congressional district, which has Cook Partisan Voting Index of R+21 and has been represented by Republican Mike Bost since 2023.

Edwards County is a dry county, with multiple referendums to allow alcohol sales failing in the mid-1990s. The portion of Grayville, Illinois that lies within Edwards County does allow alcohol sales per Grayville city ordinance.

== See also ==
- National Register of Historic Places listings in Edwards County, Illinois
