= Bareah, Florida =

Coordinates: 27°39′20″N 81°37′25″W

Bereah was a town in Polk County, Florida, United States. The town was situated 10 kilometres (6.2 mi) north-west of Avon Park. Remains include the cemetery of the Corinth Primitive Baptist Church.

== See also ==
- List of ghost towns in Florida
