= West Salem, Illinois =

- Village
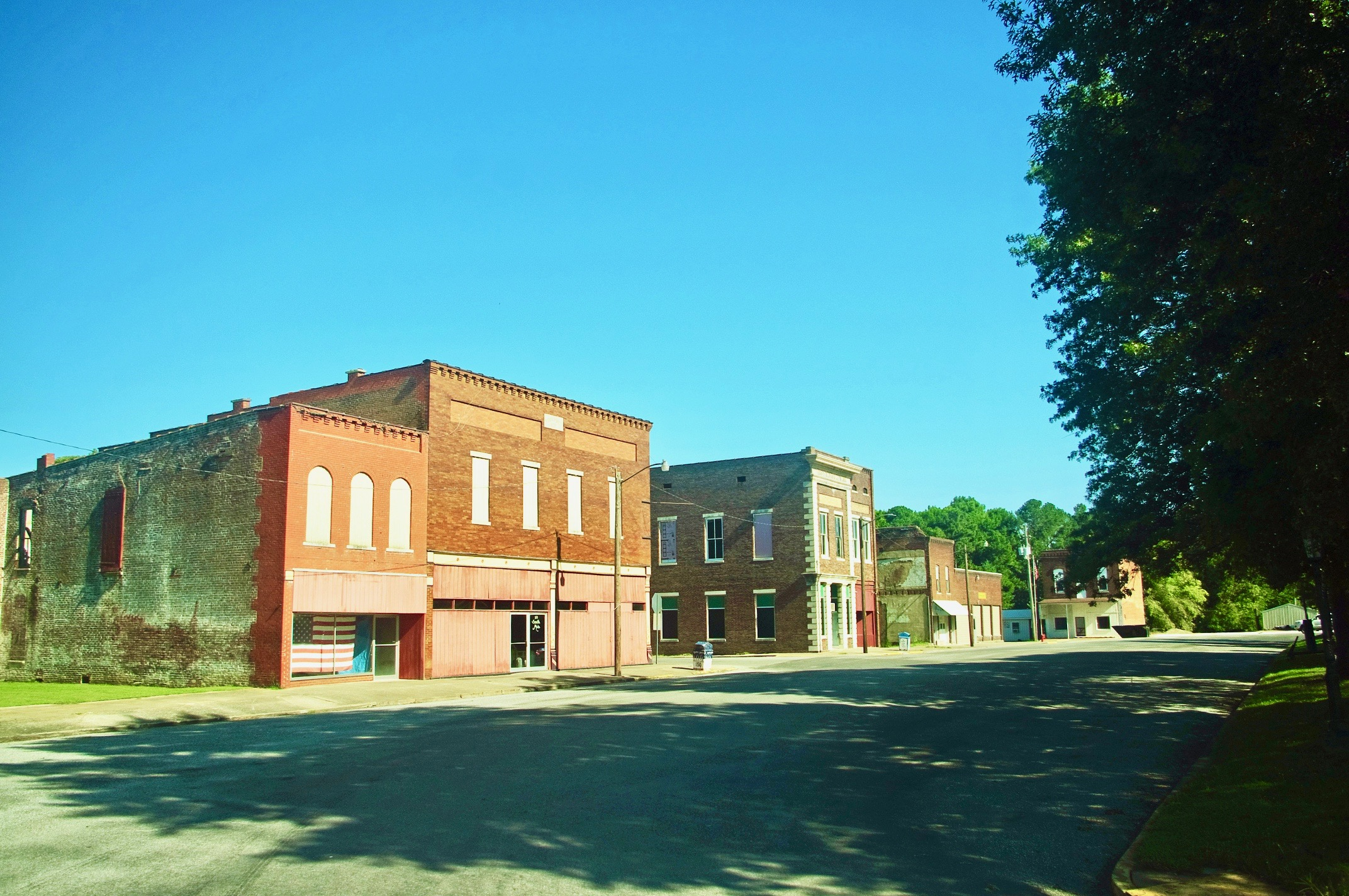
- Businesses in West Salem

- Location of West Salem in Edwards County, Illinois.
- Coordinates: 38°31′11″N 88°0′33″W
- Country: United States
- State: Illinois
- County: Edwards
- Established: February 8, 1857

Area
  - Total: 1.56 sq mi (4.04 km^{2})
  - Land: 1.56 sq mi (4.04 km^{2})
  - Water: 0 sq mi (0.00 km^{2})
- Elevation: 518 ft (158 m)

Population (2020)
  - Total: 786
  - Density: 503.9/sq mi (194.57/km^{2})
- Time zone: UTC-6 (CST)
  - Summer (DST): UTC-5 (CDT)
- ZIP code: 62476
- Area code: 618
- FIPS code: 17-80853
- GNIS ID: 2400144
- Website: westsalemil.com

West Salem is a village in Edwards County, Illinois, United States. The population was 786 at the 2020 census, down from 897 at the 2010 census.

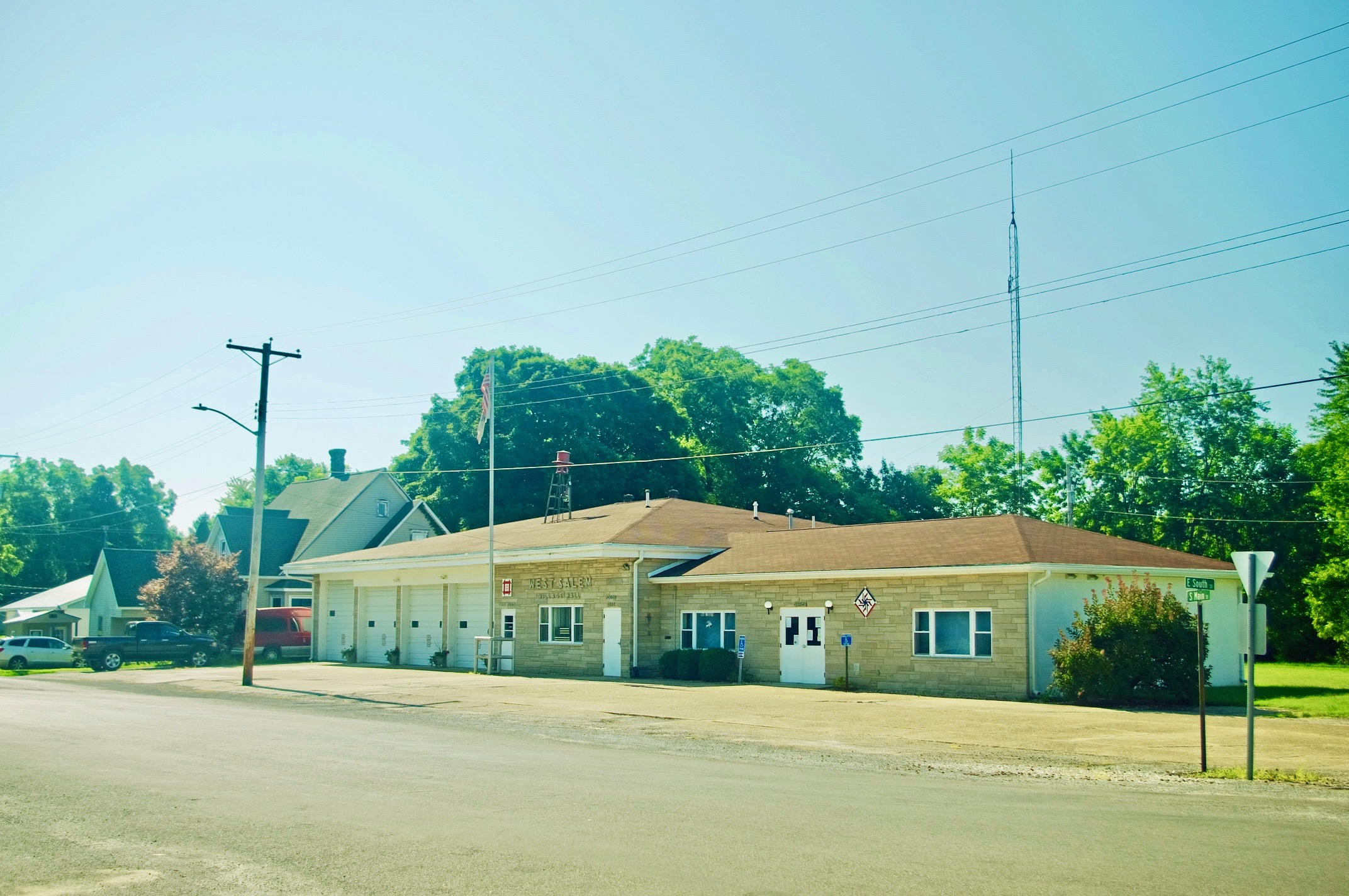
West Salem Village Hall

== History ==
The West Salem area was settled in the 1830s and early 1840s by Moravians primarily from Salem, North Carolina, and Hope, Indiana. Among the early settlers were Adam Hedrick and Peter Hinkle.

From 1841 to 1846 the new Moravian settlers were working with the headquarters of the southern province of the Moravian Church in Salem (Old Salem), North Carolina, in establishing a congregation. William Eberman, the Moravian pastor at Hope, Indiana, was sent to visit and preach for them in the fall of 1841. Many other settlers followed, until by 1843, more than 80 families lived within a 3-mile (4.8 km) radius of what was to become West Salem, most of them Moravians. But in 1843, it was Martin Hauser, a Moravian home missionary also from Hope, Indiana, who would be instrumental not only in starting a Moravian Church, but also in helping to establish the town. On Saturday, May 25, 1844, a meeting was held in Peter Hinkle's barn, where heads of 15 families came forward and signed the Brotherly Agreement and Constitution that formed the new Moravian congregation. On his way home to Hope, in 1845, Hauser stopped at the federal land Office in Palestine, Illinois, to buy, in the name of the church, 120 acres (0.49 km^{2}) of land on which West Salem is presently located. He was acting as attorney-in-fact for Rev. Charles Kluge, President of the Synod of the Southern Provincial Conference of the Moravian Church of North America.

In the years that followed, the new community of West Salem began to thrive but also to experience challenges as well. In 1849, more than 60 immigrants from Germany arrived, hoping to build homes and gravitating towards the Moravian Church. They were warmly received, but before long trouble developed between the Germans and the original English-speaking settlers. Language differences caused part of the difficulty, but the old German ideas and customs added to it. The congregations separated into "divisions", one English and one German, each with its own official board and its own pastor, but sharing the use of the church building and cemetery. After nine years of this arrangement, they became two separate congregations on February 7, 1858. The Germans retained the old church, and the English built a new church on the south side of the public square. This building was dedicated on August 14, 1859. The English retained the old cemetery, while the Germans laid out a cemetery adjacent to it. On April 10, 1892, the German congregation dedicated a new building, the present Moravian Church. Eventually the German American group began using the English language and gradually came to accept American ways. On June 13, 1925, the two congregations were reunited. The two cemeteries, which were gradually growing together, also were united at that time.

West Salem was not incorporated until 1857. When the Moravians first began arriving in the area, and Martin Hauser realized there was potential for a settlement, the group chose the name "New Salem", since they had traveled to Illinois from Salem, North Carolina. However, when it came time to establish a post office, it was discovered that Illinois already had a New Salem located near Springfield, where Abraham Lincoln had lived and operated a store. Accordingly, the settlers had to choose a new name and decided to call their village "West Salem", because it lay west of Salem, North Carolina, where they had come from. To the confusion of travelers ever since, this left West Salem east of Salem, Illinois, incorporated two years earlier. Records of the Illinois Secretary of State show that the official incorporation of West Salem took place on February 8, 1857.

The settlement was organized as a village on February 5, 1898, with 69 voting for organization and two voting against. Its first recorded Board of Trustees was William Foster Sr. (president), J.H. McDowell, J.B. Michael, E.G. Altner, George Pixley (clerk), A.L. Hammaker (treasurer), and J.B. Michel.

The first recorded organized board meeting of the village of West Salem took place on August 24, 1914. Those taking office were President Charles Pixley and Trustees James Fry, Leona Voigt, Dow Harrison, Arthur Clodfelter, E. Greathouse, and Charles Couch. Stuart Walser was clerk. Records in Village Hall do not show how these persons became the first officers, but they do not show an election of April 1915. At that time, those elected drew lots for one- or two-year terms. At the August 1914 meeting an attorney, John A. McNeil, was hired for $50 to draft a complete set of ordinances. These ordinances set boundaries and territories, set the fiscal year and meeting times, approve a corporate seal, set rules for committees and village officers, street labor, concerning peace, special elections, tax levies, annual appropriations, gaming, local improvements, establishing a prison, fines, traffic laws, etc. Thirty-one ordinances were approved by the end of 1915.

In 1951 a much needed water system was put into operation. Water was supplied from the shale pit and a lake. In 1962 a sewer system was completed, and outhouses finally went away for good. In March 2002 the village of West Salem signed a 40-year water purchase contract with RE Water Corporation. A 150,000 water storage tank was erected at the water plant.

In 1957 the West Salem Centennial Committee used funds to purchase land to be used as a park and baseball recreation area since the prior area was now being used for industrial development. The new park was called Centennial Park. The area has been used for youth baseball, as well as for circuses and other community events. One of the most popular events is the annual fireworks display held around the 4th of July every year and sponsored by the West Salem Volunteer Fire Department.

In 1965 property was bought for a village hall at 106 East South Street. A building was erected housing the volunteer fire department and the office for the clerk and treasurer, as well as a meeting room and the police department. In 1998 property just east of the village hall was purchased and the building was extended. In 1967, the West Salem Public Library opened their doors.

West Salem celebrated its centennial in 1957 and its sesquicentennial on June 29 – July 1, 2007.

== Geography ==
West Salem is located in northeastern Edwards County, 12 miles (19 km) northeast of Albion, the county seat. Illinois State Route 130 passes just west of the village.

According to the 2010 census, West Salem has a total area of 1.56 square miles (4.04 km^{2}), all land.

=== Earthquakes ===
West Salem is within the Wabash Valley seismic zone. On April 3, 1974, an earthquake of magnitude 4.3 struck at coordinates 38.549N 88.072W, just to the northwest of town, and caused minor damage such as toppling chimneys and tombstones.

On April 18, 2008, at 09:36:56 UTC (04:36:56 Central) a moderate earthquake of 5.2 magnitude was centered near the village. It was felt across southern Illinois, central Indiana and eastern portions of Missouri including St. Louis, 123 miles (198 km) away.

On November 20, 2012, a magnitude 3.6 earthquake shook the village and was felt in Evansville, Indiana.

== Demographics ==
Historical population
Census	Pop.	Note	%±
1880	315		—
1890	476		51.1%
1900	700		47.1%
1910	725		3.6%
1920	946		30.5%
1930	825		−12.8%
1940	909		10.2%
1950	902		−0.8%
1960	956		6.0%
1970	979		2.4%
1980	1,145		17.0%
1990	1,042		−9.0%
2000	1,001		−3.9%
2010	897		−10.4%
2020	786		−12.4%
U.S. Decennial Census

As of the 2020 census there were 786 people, 332 households, and 218 families residing in the village. The population density was 503.85 inhabitants per square mile (194.54/km^{2}). There were 396 housing units at an average density of 253.85 per square mile (98.01/km^{2}). The racial makeup of the village was 96.44% White, 0.25% African American, 0.76% Native American, 0.00% Asian, 0.00% Pacific Islander, 0.38% from other races, and 2.16% from two or more races. Hispanic or Latino of any race were 0.64% of the population.

There were 332 households, out of which 30.4% had children under the age of 18 living with them, 47.59% were married couples living together, 9.64% had a female householder with no husband present, and 34.34% were non-families. 33.13% of all households were made up of individuals, and 17.17% had someone living alone who was 65 years of age or older. The average household size was 3.19 and the average family size was 2.56.

The village's age distribution consisted of 27.2% under the age of 18, 7.9% from 18 to 24, 25.4% from 25 to 44, 19% from 45 to 64, and 20.5% who were 65 years of age or older. The median age was 37.8 years. For every 100 females, there were 99.5 males. For every 100 females age 18 and over, there were 108.9 males.

The median income for a household in the village was $47,024, and the median income for a family was $56,667. Males had a median income of $43,500 versus $22,679 for females. The per capita income for the village was $20,515. About 9.2% of families and 15.4% of the population were below the poverty line, including 11.2% of those under age 18 and 14.5% of those age 65 or over.

== Economy ==
=== Early industry ===
While West Salem is located in a rural area, it has had several types of industries.

As early as the 1850s a cooper's shop was in operation to supply barrels for packing fruits. A three-story frame building was built by Frederick Luther in 1878. It was used as a flour mill and was operated by a stationary steam engine. A saw mill was also operated in conjunction with the mill. In later years the Mallison Brothers also operated a flour mill and grain elevator.

By June 4, 1891, the West Salem Gazette was painting a rosy picture of the fruit industry here. Blackberries, strawberries, gooseberries, raspberries, and other fruits were raised very successfully. West Salem also once boasted a pure ice and power plant located south of the present Baker Seed Elevator.

=== Brick industry ===
The industry that probably did most for the early development of West Salem was its brick plant. A letterhead of 1918 states that the plant had a capacity of 22,000 bricks a day. At its peak it employed 50 men, who earned an average wage of $18 per week. The First Christian Church was built with bricks produced by this plant.

=== Champion Laboratories ===
It was the brick industry that gave West Salem local renown, but it has been Champion Laboratories that gave West Salem national recognition as a major supplier of automotive filters.

In the 1950s, the West Salem Industrial Foundation, which later became known as the West Salem Development Association, began a drive to attract new industry to the West Salem-Bone Gap area. A sum of $12,000 was reached initially. The plan was to pay $10,000 to an agency to find a tenant for an as yet unbuilt industrial building. Howard Gaither, Arthur McDowell, and John Beehn were instrumental in the process of seeking a manufacturing business for the community. Late in 1954 an oral agreement was reached with the firm Potter and Brumfield. Under it Gaither, McDowell, and Beehn would invest cash and Harry Clemmons would invest his machinery (he owned Kleen Pak Manufacturing) in a new company known as Kleen-Pak Corporation. Howard Gaither, one of the founding fathers of Kleen-Pak/Champion, served as company president from 1955 to 1981 and Harry Clemmons served as vice president before selling his stake in the company.

Construction of the original building began in February 1955 after the company was founded and with more community leaders coming on board for support. In 1958 Kleen-Pak merged with the Pyroil Company of La Crosse, Wisconsin. In 1956 Pyroil had purchased Champion Laboratories of Meriden, Connecticut, a filter assembly operation. Champion moved to West Salem and merged with Kleen-Pak. The merged companies continue to prosper. In 1966 an Albion plant was constructed and new buildings and additions have been made since.

In September 2007, all production operations at the West Salem facility were moved to the Albion facility.

=== Oil industry ===
In the early 1980s West Salem experienced an oil boom. At one time as many as 32 wells were pumping oil. Coming at a time when most town and county budgets were seeing red ink, the West Salem village audit of the fiscal year ending in April 1981 revealed a surplus of just over $3,500, due to the oil boom.

== Education ==
The first school house located within the limits of West Salem was a frame building about 20 by 22 feet (6.1 by 6.7 m), erected in 1850-51 and taught by Martin Hauser. On November 8, 1853, Stephen Gunn sold a tract four rods (20.1 m) square (an area of 0.10 acre) out of Lot 43 lying just across the street south of the present site to the trustees for school purposes for $2.00. A two-story four-room brick building was erected on the present site in 1880 at a cost of about $4,000. This building was later enlarged by the addition of four more rooms. The district was greatly enlarged in 1947 by the annexation of Hedrick, Gates, Burton, and Armstrong schools. A modern addition was erected in 1952 at a cost of $135,000. The old building was razed and the new part was completed in 1960 at a cost of $119,000. Kindergarten was added in 1951–52.

West Salem is currently part of Edwards County Community Unit School District 1.
