= List of Taraxacum species =

The following is a list of all 2487 species in the plant genus Taraxacum which are accepted by Plants of the World Online as of 19 June 2024.

== A ==
- Taraxacum abalienatum Kirschner & Štěpánek
- Taraxacum abax Kirschner & Štěpánek
- Taraxacum abbreviatulum Kirschner & Štěpánek
- Taraxacum abbreviatum Rail.
- Taraxacum aberrans Hagend., Soest & Zevenb.
- Taraxacum abietifolium Saarsoo
- Taraxacum abnorme Štěpánek & Kirschner
- Taraxacum abruptilobum Štěpánek & Kirschner
- Taraxacum absurdum Soest
- Taraxacum abundans Rail.
- Taraxacum accedens G.E.Haglund
- Taraxacum acervans Rail.
- Taraxacum acervatulum Rail.
- Taraxacum acidotum M.P.Christ.
- Taraxacum aclidiforme Rail.
- Taraxacum acre H.Øllg.
- Taraxacum acricorne Dahlst.
- Taraxacum acriculum Rail.
- Taraxacum acrifolium Dahlst.
- Taraxacum acrocuspidatum Sonck
- Taraxacum acroglossum Dahlst.
- Taraxacum acrolobum Dahlst.
- Taraxacum acromaurum Dahlst.
- Taraxacum acrophilum Kirschner & Štěpánek
- Taraxacum acrophorum G.E.Haglund
- Taraxacum acutangulum Markl.
- Taraxacum acutatum M.P.Christ.
- Taraxacum acutidens H.Lindb.
- Taraxacum acutifidum M.P.Christ.
- Taraxacum acutiformatum Rail.
- Taraxacum acutifrons Markl.
- Taraxacum acutilimbatum H.Øllg.
- Taraxacum acutisectum Markl.
- Taraxacum acutiusculum Sonck
- Taraxacum acutum A.J.Richards
- Taraxacum adamifolium Sahlin
- Taraxacum adamii C.Claire
- Taraxacum adamovicii Štěpánek & Kirschner
- Taraxacum adglabrum Kirschner & Štěpánek
- Taraxacum adhaerens Kirschner & Štěpánek
- Taraxacum admordum Sonck
- Taraxacum adpressiforme G.E.Haglund
- Taraxacum adpressum Dahlst.
- Taraxacum adunans G.E.Haglund
- Taraxacum aduncum Soest
- Taraxacum adustum Kirschner & Štěpánek
- Taraxacum aellenii Soest
- Taraxacum aemilianum Foggi & Ricceri
- Taraxacum aemulans Štěpánek & Kirschner
- Taraxacum aeneum Kirschner & Štěpánek
- Taraxacum aequabile G.E.Haglund
- Taraxacum aequilibratum Kirschner & Štěpánek
- Taraxacum aequilobiforme Soest
- Taraxacum aequilobum Dahlst.
- Taraxacum aequisectum M.P.Christ.
- Taraxacum aereum Soest
- Taraxacum aeruginiceps G.E.Haglund ex Sahlin
- Taraxacum aesculosum A.J.Richards
- Taraxacum aestivum Soest
- Taraxacum aetheocranum G.E.Haglund
- Taraxacum aethiopiforme H.Øllg.
- Taraxacum aethiops G.E.Haglund
- Taraxacum aganophytum Soest
- Taraxacum agaurum Soest
- Taraxacum aginnense Hofstra
- Taraxacum agrarium Sonck
- Taraxacum ahlneri Rail.
- Taraxacum ajanense Vorosch.
- Taraxacum ajano-majense Tzvelev
- Taraxacum akranesense M.P.Christ.
- Taraxacum akteum Hagend., Soest & Zevenb.
- Taraxacum alacre Soest
- Taraxacum alaskanum Rydb.
- Taraxacum alatiforme Rail.
- Taraxacum alatopetiolum D.T.Zhai & C.H.An
- Taraxacum alatum H.Lindb.
- Taraxacum albertshoferi Sahlin
- Taraxacum albescens Dahlst.
- Taraxacum albidum Dahlst.
- Taraxacum albiflos Kirschner & Štěpánek
- Taraxacum albulense Soest
- Taraxacum album Kirschner & Štěpánek
- Taraxacum aleppicum Dahlst.
- Taraxacum aleurodes G.E.Haglund
- Taraxacum algarbiense Soest
- Taraxacum almaatense Schischk.
- Taraxacum alpicola Kitam.
- Taraxacum alsaticum Soest
- Taraxacum altipotens Rail.
- Taraxacum altissimum H.Lindb.
- Taraxacum amabile Soest
- Taraxacum amansii Hofstra
- Taraxacum amarellum Kirschner & Štěpánek
- Taraxacum amaurolepis Markl.
- Taraxacum ambitiosum Kirschner & Štěpánek
- Taraxacum amblylepidocarpum Soest
- Taraxacum amborum G.E.Haglund
- Taraxacum ambrosium Kirschner & Štěpánek
- Taraxacum amgense Kuvaev
- Taraxacum amicorum A.J.Richards
- Taraxacum amoenulum Štěpánek & Kirschner
- Taraxacum amphilobum M.P.Christ.
- Taraxacum amphiphron Böcher
- Taraxacum amphoraefrons Sahlin
- Taraxacum amplexum Sonck
- Taraxacum ampliusculum Rail.
- Taraxacum amplum Markl.
- Taraxacum ampullaceum Saarsoo
- Taraxacum anadyrense Nakai & Koidz.
- Taraxacum anadyricum Tzvelev
- Taraxacum anatolicum Soest
- Taraxacum ancistratum H.Øllg.
- Taraxacum ancistrolobum Dahlst.
- Taraxacum ancoriferum Hudziok
- Taraxacum andersonii G.E.Haglund
- Taraxacum andorriense Sahlin
- Taraxacum androssovii Schischk.
- Taraxacum anemoomum Soest
- Taraxacum anfractum M.P.Christ.
- Taraxacum angarense Kirschner & Štěpánek
- Taraxacum anglicum Dahlst.
- Taraxacum angulare Hagend., Soest & Zevenb.
- Taraxacum anguliferum Rail.
- Taraxacum angusticeps G.E.Haglund ex Soest
- Taraxacum angustisectum H.Lindb.
- Taraxacum angustisquameum Dahlst. ex H.Lindb.
- Taraxacum annae Vainberg
- Taraxacum annalisae Carlesi & Peruzzi
- Taraxacum annetteae Uhlemann
- Taraxacum anomalum Kirschner & Štěpánek
- Taraxacum anomum G.E.Haglund
- Taraxacum anzobicum Schischk. ex Vainberg
- Taraxacum apargia Kirschner & Štěpánek
- Taraxacum apargiiforme Dahlst.
- Taraxacum apenninum (Ten.) DC.
- Taraxacum aperavtum Soest
- Taraxacum aphanochroum Hagend., Soest & Zevenb.
- Taraxacum aphrogenes Meikle
- Taraxacum apicatum Brenner
- Taraxacum apiculatiforme Soest
- Taraxacum apollinis Dahlst.
- Taraxacum aposeris Soest
- Taraxacum appositum M.P.Christ.
- Taraxacum apulicum Soest
- Taraxacum aquilinum Štěpánek & Kirschner
- Taraxacum aquilonare Hand.-Mazz.
- Taraxacum aquitanum Hofstra
- Taraxacum arachnoideum Kirschner & Štěpánek
- Taraxacum arachnotrichum Markl.
- Taraxacum aragonicum Sahlin
- Taraxacum araneosum Dahlst.
- Taraxacum arasanum R.Doll
- Taraxacum arcticum (Trautv.) Dahlst.
- Taraxacum arcuatum (Tausch) Dumort.
- Taraxacum ardlense A.J.Richards
- Taraxacum arenastrum A.J.Richards
- Taraxacum arenicola Lindb. ex R.Doll
- Taraxacum argillicola Soest
- Taraxacum argilliticola Björk
- Taraxacum argoviense Soest
- Taraxacum argutifrons A.J.Richards
- Taraxacum argutisectum Kirschner & Štěpánek
- Taraxacum argutulum G.E.Haglund
- Taraxacum argutum Dahlst.
- Taraxacum aridicola Rail.
- Taraxacum aristum G.E.Haglund & Markl.
- Taraxacum armatifrons Hagend., Soest & Zevenb.
- Taraxacum armatum M.P.Christ.
- Taraxacum armeniacum Schischk.
- Taraxacum arquitenens Rail.
- Taraxacum arrectipes G.E.Haglund
- Taraxacum arrectum Rail.
- Taraxacum arrhenii Palmgr.
- Taraxacum arrigens M.P.Christ.
- Taraxacum artificis Sonck
- Taraxacum artutum Rail.
- Taraxacum arvernum De Langhe & Soest
- Taraxacum ascensum Rail.
- Taraxacum aschabadense Schischk.
- Taraxacum ascitum Rail.
- Taraxacum asconense Dahlst.
- Taraxacum aspectabile Štěpánek, Kirschner, Vašut & Trávn.
- Taraxacum asperatilobum H.Øllg.
- Taraxacum assemanii C.I.Blanche ex Boiss.
- Taraxacum assimulans G.E.Haglund
- Taraxacum assurgens Markl.
- Taraxacum asturiense Soest
- Taraxacum atactum Sahlin & Soest
- Taraxacum atlanticola H.Lindb.
- Taraxacum atlanticum Pomel
- Taraxacum atlantis-majoris H.Lindb.
- Taraxacum atomatum Štěpánek & Kirschner
- Taraxacum atonolobum Hagend., Soest & Zevenb.
- Taraxacum atrans Schischk.
- Taraxacum atratum G.E.Haglund
- Taraxacum atricapillum Sonck
- Taraxacum atriceps G.E.Haglund
- Taraxacum atrimarginatum H.Lindb.
- Taraxacum atrocarpum Kirschner & Štěpánek
- Taraxacum atrocephalum Soest
- Taraxacum atrochlorinum Kirschner & Štěpánek
- Taraxacum atrocollinum A.J.Richards
- Taraxacum atrolivaceum Štěpánek & Kirschner
- Taraxacum atroparadoxum Kirschner & Štěpánek
- Taraxacum atroplumbeum Dahlst.
- Taraxacum atropurpureum Kirschner, Štěpánek, Buryy, Cherny. & Efimov
- Taraxacum atrosquamatum Soest
- Taraxacum atrosubtile Kirschner & Štěpánek
- Taraxacum atroviride Štěpánek & Trávn.
- Taraxacum atrox Kirschner & Štěpánek
- Taraxacum attenuens Rail.
- Taraxacum aurantellum Soest
- Taraxacum aurantiacum Dahlst.
- Taraxacum aureocucullatum Soest
- Taraxacum auriapex Rail.
- Taraxacum auricula Štěpánek & Kirschner
- Taraxacum aurorum Soest
- Taraxacum aurosuloides Soest
- Taraxacum aurosulum H.Lindb.
- Taraxacum austrinum G.E.Haglund
- Taraxacum austrotibetanum Kirschner & Štěpánek
- Taraxacum austrouralense Muldashev & Tzvelev
- Taraxacum authionense Soest
- Taraxacum autumnale Castagne
- Taraxacum autumnaliforme Soest
- Taraxacum ayllonense A.Galán & Vicente Orell.
- Taraxacum azerbaijanicum Soest
- Taraxacum aznavourii Soest
- Taraxacum azureum M.P.Christ.
- Taraxacum azzizii Soest

== B ==
- Taraxacum babcockii Kirschner & Štěpánek
- Taraxacum bachczisaraicum Tzvelev
- Taraxacum badiocinnamomeum Kirschner & Štěpánek
- Taraxacum badzhalense Vorosch. & Schlothg.
- Taraxacum baeckii Rail.
- Taraxacum baeckiiforme Sahlin
- Taraxacum bakuense R.Doll
- Taraxacum balcanicum Rech.f.
- Taraxacum balticiforme Dahlst.
- Taraxacum balticum Dahlst.
- Taraxacum baltistanicum Soest
- Taraxacum baluchistanicum Soest
- Taraxacum banhyhalense Soest
- Taraxacum barbaricinum Arrigoni
- Taraxacum barbatulum H.Øllg.
- Taraxacum bargusicum Sahlin
- Taraxacum barycephalum G.E.Haglund
- Taraxacum basalticum Soest
- Taraxacum bashkiricum Muldashev & Tzvelev
- Taraxacum basilicum Štěpánek & Kirschner
- Taraxacum bavaricum Soest
- Taraxacum beeftinkii Hagend., Soest & Zevenb.
- Taraxacum behzudicum Soest
- Taraxacum bellicum Sonck
- Taraxacum bellidiforme Soest
- Taraxacum bellum H.Øllg.
- Taraxacum belonodens Soest
- Taraxacum belorussicum Val.N.Tikhom.
- Taraxacum benevolens Štěpánek & Kirschner
- Taraxacum bernhardi Rail.
- Taraxacum berthae C.C.Haw.
- Taraxacum besarabicum (Hornem.) Hand.-Mazz.
- Taraxacum bezidum R.Doll
- Taraxacum bhutanicum Soest
- Taraxacum bibulum Kirschner & Štěpánek
- Taraxacum bicorne Dahlst.
- Taraxacum bidentilobum Sonck
- Taraxacum bifalcatum Sonck
- Taraxacum biformatum H.Lindb.
- Taraxacum biforme Dahlst.
- Taraxacum binilobatum Sahlin
- Taraxacum bipinnatifidum Dahlst.
- Taraxacum bisectum Malmio
- Taraxacum bithynicum DC.
- Taraxacum blanditum Sahlin
- Taraxacum blandum Štěpánek & Kirschner
- Taraxacum blomgrenii G.E.Haglund
- Taraxacum boekmanii Borgv.
- Taraxacum bohemicum Kirschner & Štěpánek
- Taraxacum boldtii H.Lindb.
- Taraxacum bonae-spei Kirschner & Štěpánek
- Taraxacum boreicedens Rail.
- Taraxacum boreicola Rail.
- Taraxacum boreiforme Sonck
- Taraxacum boreophilum H.Lindb.
- Taraxacum boreum Dahlst.
- Taraxacum borgvallii Dahlst. ex G.E.Haglund
- Taraxacum botanicorum Sonck
- Taraxacum botschantzevii Schischk.
- Taraxacum brabanticum Hagend., Soest & Zevenb.
- Taraxacum brachycephalum Dahlst.
- Taraxacum brachyceras Dahlst.
- Taraxacum brachyeces G.E.Haglund
- Taraxacum brachyglossoides Soest
- Taraxacum brachyglossum (Dahlst.) Raunk.
- Taraxacum brachylepis Markl. ex Puol.
- Taraxacum brachyoncum G.E.Haglund
- Taraxacum brachyphyllum H.Koidz.
- Taraxacum brachypodon G.E.Haglund ex Soest
- Taraxacum brachyrhynchum G.E.Haglund
- Taraxacum bracteatum Dahlst.
- Taraxacum bracteolatum Soest
- Taraxacum brakelii Soest
- Taraxacum brandenburgicum Hudziok
- Taraxacum brassicifolium Kitag.
- Taraxacum braun-blanquetii Soest
- Taraxacum breconense C.C.Haw.
- Taraxacum breitfeldii Uhlemann
- Taraxacum brevialatum G.E.Haglund
- Taraxacum brevidentatum Rail.
- Taraxacum brevifloroides Soest
- Taraxacum breviflorum Dahlst.
- Taraxacum brevihastatum M.P.Christ.
- Taraxacum brevipapposum Sonck
- Taraxacum brevipyramidale Rail.
- Taraxacum brevirostre Hand.-Mazz.
- Taraxacum breviscapum A.J.Richards
- Taraxacum brevisectoides Soest
- Taraxacum brevisectum Palmgr.
- Taraxacum brevum R.Doll
- Taraxacum britannicum Dahlst.
- Taraxacum broddesonii Lundev. & H.Øllg.
- Taraxacum brunneum Soest
- Taraxacum bufonium Kirschner & Štěpánek
- Taraxacum bulgaricum Soest
- Taraxacum bulkovii Kovalevsk.
- Taraxacum buttleri Soest
- Taraxacum byrrangicum Kozhevn.

== C ==
- Taraxacum cabannaeforme J.Räsänen
- Taraxacum cachkadzorum R.Doll
- Taraxacum cacuminatifrons Rail.
- Taraxacum cacuminatum G.E.Haglund
- Taraxacum caespitans Dahlst.
- Taraxacum caespitosum Soest
- Taraxacum calabricum Aquaro, Caparelli & Peruzzi
- Taraxacum calamistratum G.E.Haglund
- Taraxacum calanthodium Dahlst.
- Taraxacum calanthum Dahlst.
- Taraxacum calcareum Korol.
- Taraxacum calciphilum A.J.Richards & Soest
- Taraxacum caledonicum A.J.Richards
- Taraxacum californicum Munz & I.M.Johnst.
- Taraxacum calliographum G.E.Haglund
- Taraxacum calliops G.E.Haglund
- Taraxacum callosum Soest
- Taraxacum calocapitatum R.Doll
- Taraxacum calocephaloides A.J.Richards
- Taraxacum calocephalum Hand.-Mazz.
- Taraxacum calochroum Hagend., Soest & Zevenb.
- Taraxacum calomorphum G.E.Haglund ex Soest
- Taraxacum calophlebium Sonck
- Taraxacum calophyllum Dahlst.
- Taraxacum caloschistoides G.E.Haglund ex Sahlin
- Taraxacum caloschistum Dahlst.
- Taraxacum cambricum A.J.Richards
- Taraxacum campoduniense Sahlin
- Taraxacum campylodes G.E.Haglund
- Taraxacum camuratum Rail.
- Taraxacum canaliculatum H.Lindb.
- Taraxacum canarense Soest
- Taraxacum candidatum Kirschner, Štěpánek & Klimeš
- Taraxacum candrianii Soest
- Taraxacum canentifolium Markl.
- Taraxacum caninum Uhlemann
- Taraxacum canophyllum Soest
- Taraxacum canoviride H.Lindb. ex Puol.
- Taraxacum cantabricum A.Galán & Vicente Orell.
- Taraxacum canulum G.E.Haglund
- Taraxacum canum Soest
- Taraxacum caphocentrum Dahlst.
- Taraxacum capillosum H.Øllg. & Uhlemann
- Taraxacum capnocarpum Dahlst.
- Taraxacum capricum Soest
- Taraxacum caramanicae Lojac.
- Taraxacum cardinale Kirschner & Štěpánek
- Taraxacum cariciphilum Sonck & H.Øllg.
- Taraxacum carinthiacum Soest
- Taraxacum carneocoloratum A.Nelson
- Taraxacum caroli-frederici Rail.
- Taraxacum carpaticum Štěpánek & Kirschner
- Taraxacum carptum H.Øllg. & J.Räsänen
- Taraxacum carthusianorum Aquaro, Caparelli & Peruzzi
- Taraxacum castaneum Soest
- Taraxacum catalanum Soest
- Taraxacum cataschistum Sahlin
- Taraxacum catenatum Kirschner & Štěpánek
- Taraxacum catodontum Sahlin
- Taraxacum caudatuliforme Soest
- Taraxacum caudatulum Dahlst.
- Taraxacum caudiferum G.E.Haglund
- Taraxacum celsum Kirschner & Štěpánek
- Taraxacum celticum A.J.Richards
- Taraxacum cenabense Sahlin
- Taraxacum centrasiaticum D.T.Zhai & C.H.An
- Taraxacum centrotum Sahlin
- Taraxacum cephalum R.Doll
- Taraxacum ceratolobum Dahlst.
- Taraxacum ceratophorum (Ledeb.) DC.
- Taraxacum ceratosectum Kirschner & Štěpánek
- Taraxacum cerbariense Arrigoni
- Taraxacum cerdanicum Soest
- Taraxacum cerebriforme Kirschner & Štěpánek
- Taraxacum cereum Kirschner & Štěpánek
- Taraxacum cescae Aquaro, Caparelli & Peruzzi
- Taraxacum cestodes Rail.
- Taraxacum chelelobatum Sahlin
- Taraxacum cherwellense A.J.Richards
- Taraxacum chionogeiton Štěpánek & Kirschner
- Taraxacum chionomelas Kirschner & Štěpánek
- Taraxacum chionophilum Dahlst.
- Taraxacum chitralense Soest
- Taraxacum chloodeum M.P.Christ.
- Taraxacum chlorodes G.E.Haglund
- Taraxacum chlorofrugale Oosterv. ex A.J.Richards
- Taraxacum chloroticum Dahlst. ex Florstr.
- Taraxacum christelianum Sonck
- Taraxacum christiansenii G.E.Haglund
- Taraxacum chrysocephalum Štěpánek & Kirschner
- Taraxacum chrysoglossum A.J.Richards
- Taraxacum chrysophaenum Rail.
- Taraxacum chrysostylum Dahlst.
- Taraxacum ciconium M.P.Christ.
- Taraxacum ciliare Soest
- Taraxacum ciliatum Soest
- Taraxacum cinereum Soest
- Taraxacum cinnamomeum Kirschner & Štěpánek
- Taraxacum circense Štěpánek & Kirschner
- Taraxacum circinatum G.E.Haglund ex Soest
- Taraxacum ciscaucasicum Schischk.
- Taraxacum citrinum Rail.
- Taraxacum clandestinum Zámečník, Štěpánek & Kirschner
- Taraxacum clarum Kirschner, Štěpánek & Trávn.
- Taraxacum claudiae A.J.Richards
- Taraxacum clavatifrons Sonck
- Taraxacum clavatilobum Uhlemann
- Taraxacum claviflorum Sahlin
- Taraxacum clemens Matysiak
- Taraxacum clitolobum M.P.Christ.
- Taraxacum clovense A.J.Richards
- Taraxacum coacervans Rail.
- Taraxacum coartatiforme J.Räsänen
- Taraxacum coartatum G.E.Haglund
- Taraxacum cochleatoides Rail.
- Taraxacum cochleatum Dahlst. & H.Lindb.
- Taraxacum cognatum Kirschner & Štěpánek
- Taraxacum cognoscibile Štěpánek & Kirschner
- Taraxacum collariatum Vorosch.
- Taraxacum collarispinulosum Uhlemann
- Taraxacum comitans Kovalevsk.
- Taraxacum commixtum G.E.Haglund
- Taraxacum compactum Schischk.
- Taraxacum complicatum Soest
- Taraxacum comtulum G.E.Haglund
- Taraxacum conauditatum Kirschner & Štěpánek
- Taraxacum concaviformatum Rail.
- Taraxacum concavum M.P.Christ.
- Taraxacum concinnaticeps Rail.
- Taraxacum concinnum G.E.Haglund
- Taraxacum concolor H.Lindb.
- Taraxacum concucullatum A.J.Richards
- Taraxacum conforme Palmgr.
- Taraxacum confusaneum Kirschner & Štěpánek
- Taraxacum confusum Schischk.
- Taraxacum congestilobum Soest
- Taraxacum congestum G.E.Haglund & Saarsoo
- Taraxacum conicum R.Doll
- Taraxacum consanguineum Kirschner & Štěpánek
- Taraxacum consimile Kirschner & Štěpánek
- Taraxacum consobrinum Kirschner & Štěpánek
- Taraxacum conspersum H.Øllg.
- Taraxacum constrictiforme Rail.
- Taraxacum constrictifrons Markl. ex Eklund
- Taraxacum continium G.E.Haglund ex Sahlin
- Taraxacum contractum Markl.
- Taraxacum contristans Kovalevsk.
- Taraxacum conturbatum Sonck
- Taraxacum convergentilobatum Rail.
- Taraxacum convexum Dahlst.
- Taraxacum copidophylloides A.J.Richards
- Taraxacum copidophyllum Dahlst.
- Taraxacum cordatifolium Soest
- Taraxacum cordatifrons M.P.Christ.
- Taraxacum cordatum Palmgr.
- Taraxacum cordiferum Markl.
- Taraxacum cordilleranum Björk
- Taraxacum coreanum Nakai
- Taraxacum corneolum Railonsala.
- Taraxacum cornubiense A.J.Richards
- Taraxacum cornucopiae Kirschner & Štěpánek
- Taraxacum cornutum (Dahlst.) Dahlst.
- Taraxacum coronatum Hand.-Mazz.
- Taraxacum corpulentum Rail.
- Taraxacum corsicum Soest
- Taraxacum corvinum Kirschner & Štěpánek
- Taraxacum corynodes G.E.Haglund
- Taraxacum corynodiforme Hagend., Soest & Zevenb.
- Taraxacum coryphorum Sahlin
- Taraxacum craspedotoides A.J.Richards
- Taraxacum craspedotum Dahlst.
- Taraxacum crassipes H.Lindb.
- Taraxacum crassiusculum Rail.
- Taraxacum crassum H.Øllg. & Trávn.
- Taraxacum crebridens H.Lindb.
- Taraxacum crepidiforme DC.
- Taraxacum crispatum Dahlst.
- Taraxacum crispifolium H.Lindb.
- Taraxacum crispulum G.E.Haglund
- Taraxacum cristatum Kirschner, Štěpánek & Vašut
- Taraxacum croaticum Uhlemann
- Taraxacum croceicarpum Soest
- Taraxacum croceifloroides Soest
- Taraxacum croceiflorum Dahlst.
- Taraxacum crocellum Soest
- Taraxacum croceum Dahlst.
- Taraxacum crocinum (Dahlst.) G.E.Haglund & Nordenst.
- Taraxacum crocodes Dahlst.
- Taraxacum cucullatiforme Soest
- Taraxacum cucullatum Dahlst.
- Taraxacum cultratum G.E.Haglund ex Soest
- Taraxacum cumulatum Rail.
- Taraxacum cuneatum Sonck
- Taraxacum curtifrons H.Øllg.
- Taraxacum curvatum Dahlst.
- Taraxacum curvilobatum Sahlin
- Taraxacum cuspidatum Markl.
- Taraxacum cuspidifrons Markl.
- Taraxacum cuspidigerum Rail.
- Taraxacum cyanolepidiforme Soest
- Taraxacum cyanolepis Dahlst.
- Taraxacum cyathiforme Kirschner & Štěpánek
- Taraxacum cyclocentrum M.P.Christ.
- Taraxacum cycloides Rail.
- Taraxacum cygnorum Hand.-Mazz.
- Taraxacum cylleneum Fürnkranz
- Taraxacum cymbifolium H.Lindb. ex Dahlst.
- Taraxacum cyprium H.Lindb.
- Taraxacum cyrtolobum G.E.Haglund
- Taraxacum cyrtum Sahlin
- Taraxacum czaunense Jurtzev & Tzvelev
- Taraxacum czukoticum Jurtzev

== D ==
- Taraxacum dahlii Dahlst.
- Taraxacum damnabile Kirschner & Štěpánek
- Taraxacum danicum H.Øllg.
- Taraxacum danubiense Sahlin
- Taraxacum danubium A.J.Richards
- Taraxacum darbandense Soest
- Taraxacum dargilanicum Sonck
- Taraxacum darschajense Orazova
- Taraxacum darvasicum Vainberg
- Taraxacum dasypodum Soest
- Taraxacum dasypogonum Rail.
- Taraxacum davisii Soest
- Taraxacum davosense Soest
- Taraxacum dealbatum Hand.-Mazz.
- Taraxacum debrayi Hagend., Soest & Zevenb.
- Taraxacum decastroi A.Galán & Vicente Orell.
- Taraxacum decipiens Raunk.
- Taraxacum declive M.P.Christ.
- Taraxacum declivicola Kirschner, Sonck & Štěpánek
- Taraxacum decolorans Dahlst.
- Taraxacum decorum Dahlst.
- Taraxacum decrepitum Kirschner & Štěpánek
- Taraxacum degelii G.E.Haglund
- Taraxacum delanghii Soest
- Taraxacum delectum Uhlemann
- Taraxacum delicatulum Kirschner & Štěpánek
- Taraxacum delicatum Kirschner & Štěpánek
- Taraxacum delphicum Dahlst.
- Taraxacum deltoideum G.E.Haglund
- Taraxacum deltoidifrons H.Øllg.
- Taraxacum deludens Kirschner & Štěpánek
- Taraxacum deminutum Kirschner & Štěpánek
- Taraxacum demotes Sahlin
- Taraxacum denigratum Kirschner & Štěpánek
- Taraxacum densilobum Dahlst.
- Taraxacum dentatum Kirschner & Štěpánek
- Taraxacum dentex M.P.Christ.
- Taraxacum denticulatum Hagend., Soest & Zevenb.
- Taraxacum dentilobum Soest
- Taraxacum dentisquamosum Rail.
- Taraxacum dentosum M.P.Christ.
- Taraxacum deorum A.J.Richards
- Taraxacum depauperatum Kirschner & Štěpánek
- Taraxacum desertorum Schischk.
- Taraxacum desideratum Sonck
- Taraxacum detonsum Olojsson & Såltin
- Taraxacum devexum M.P.Christ.
- Taraxacum devians Dahlst.
- Taraxacum dialeptum Sonck
- Taraxacum diaphorum G.E.Haglund
- Taraxacum diapyrum Soest
- Taraxacum diastematicum Markl.
- Taraxacum didymifolium Soest
- Taraxacum dilaceratum M.P.Christ.
- Taraxacum dilaniatum Rail.
- Taraxacum dilatatum H.Lindb.
- Taraxacum dilucidum Soest
- Taraxacum dilutissimum Kirschner & Štěpánek
- Taraxacum dispar G.E.Haglund
- Taraxacum dissectiforme Soest
- Taraxacum disseminatoides A.J.Richards
- Taraxacum disseminatum G.E.Haglund
- Taraxacum dissimile Dahlst.
- Taraxacum dissonum Rail.
- Taraxacum distans G.E.Haglund
- Taraxacum distantijugum Sahlin
- Taraxacum distantilobum H.Lindb.
- Taraxacum distinctilobum H.Øllg.
- Taraxacum distinctum H.Lindb.
- Taraxacum divarium Sahlin
- Taraxacum diversicolor Sonck
- Taraxacum diversifolium G.E.Haglund
- Taraxacum diversilobum G.E.Haglund
- Taraxacum divinum Sonck
- Taraxacum divulgatum Kirschner & Štěpánek
- Taraxacum divulsifolium Soest
- Taraxacum divulsiforme R.Doll
- Taraxacum divulsum G.E.Haglund
- Taraxacum dolichocentrum M.P.Christ.
- Taraxacum dolmiticum Soest
- Taraxacum domabile Kirschner & Štěpánek
- Taraxacum dombaiense R.Doll
- Taraxacum dooguei A.J.Richards
- Taraxacum dorchocarpum Soest
- Taraxacum dovrense Dahlst.
- Taraxacum drucei Dahlst.
- Taraxacum dubium Soest
- Taraxacum ducommunii Soest
- Taraxacum dudmanianum A.J.Richards
- Taraxacum dunense Soest
- Taraxacum dunenseforme Sonck
- Taraxacum duplidentifrons Dahlst.
- Taraxacum duriense Soest
- Taraxacum duvigneaudii Soest
- Taraxacum dzhungaricola Kirschner & Štěpánek

== E ==
- Taraxacum ecmiadzinum R.Doll
- Taraxacum ecornutum Kovalevsk.
- Taraxacum edessicoides Uhlemann
- Taraxacum edmondsonianum H.Øllg.
- Taraxacum edytomum G.E.Haglund
- Taraxacum effusum Hagend., Soest & Zevenb.
- Taraxacum egilsstadirense M.P.Christ.
- Taraxacum egnatiae Sonck
- Taraxacum egregium Markl.
- Taraxacum ekmanii Dahlst.
- Taraxacum ekmaniiforme Hagend., Soest & Zevenb.
- Taraxacum elaverinum Sahlin
- Taraxacum elegans Soest
- Taraxacum elegantiforme Soest
- Taraxacum elegantifrons A.J.Richards
- Taraxacum elegantissimum Štěpánek & Kirschner
- Taraxacum elegantius Kirschner, H.Øllg. & Štěpánek
- Taraxacum elongatifrons G.E.Haglund
- Taraxacum elongatihastatum W.Koch ex Soest
- Taraxacum elongatum Kovalevsk.
- Taraxacum eminens Soest
- Taraxacum engadinense Soest
- Taraxacum enontekiense Rail.
- Taraxacum ensiculare Rail.
- Taraxacum ensigerum G.E.Haglund
- Taraxacum epacroides Markl. ex Puol.
- Taraxacum epacrum Dahlst.
- Taraxacum epirense Soest
- Taraxacum erectiusculilobatum Rail.
- Taraxacum erici H.Øllg. & J.Räsänen
- Taraxacum ericinoides Hagend., Soest & Zevenb.
- Taraxacum eriobasis Kovalevsk.
- Taraxacum eriopodum DC.
- Taraxacum erioscapum H.Hartmann
- Taraxacum erntrum Soest
- Taraxacum erostre Zakirov
- Taraxacum erythropodium Kitag.
- Taraxacum erythrospermum Andrz. ex Besser
- Taraxacum erzincanense Döll
- Taraxacum espinulosum M.P.Christ.
- Taraxacum estrelense A.Galán & Vicente Orell.
- Taraxacum etchebarnei Sonck
- Taraxacum eudontum Sahlin
- Taraxacum euoplocarpum Markl. ex H.Lindb.
- Taraxacum euranum Soest
- Taraxacum euryanthes G.E.Haglund ex Soest
- Taraxacum eurylobum G.E.Haglund
- Taraxacum euryphyllum (Dahlst.) M.P.Christ.
- Taraxacum exacutum Markl.
- Taraxacum excellens Dahlst.
- Taraxacum exiguiceps Markl.
- Taraxacum exiguum Soest
- Taraxacum eximium Dahlst.
- Taraxacum expallidiforme Dahlst.
- Taraxacum expallidum Dahlst.
- Taraxacum expandens Lundev. & H.Øllg.
- Taraxacum expansum Florstr.
- Taraxacum explicatum G.E.Haglund
- Taraxacum exsanguineum Soest
- Taraxacum exsertiforme Hagend., Soest & Zevenb.
- Taraxacum exsertum Hagend., Soest & Zevenb.
- Taraxacum exsolutum Kirschner & Štěpánek
- Taraxacum exstinctum Kirschner & Štěpánek
- Taraxacum exsurgens Soest
- Taraxacum extensifrons G.E.Haglund
- Taraxacum extensum Dahlst.
- Taraxacum extenuens Rail.
- Taraxacum extimum Kirschner, Sonck & Štěpánek

== F ==
- Taraxacum fabrei Soest
- Taraxacum facetum Rail.
- Taraxacum facile Sonck
- Taraxacum faeroense (Dahlst.) Dahlst.
- Taraxacum fagerstroemii Såltin
- Taraxacum falcatum Brenner
- Taraxacum farellonicum Uhlemann
- Taraxacum farinosum Hausskn. & Bornm. ex Hand.-Mazz.
- Taraxacum fartoris Kirschner & Štěpánek
- Taraxacum fasciatiforme Soest
- Taraxacum fasciatum Dahlst.
- Taraxacum fascinans Kirschner, Mikoláš & Štěpánek
- Taraxacum fastuosum Štěpánek, Kirschner, Zámečník & P.Trávn.
- Taraxacum faucicola Sahlin
- Taraxacum favorabile Štěpánek & Kirschner
- Taraxacum fedtschenkoi Hand.-Mazz.
- Taraxacum fennobalticum Sonck & Y.Mäkinen
- Taraxacum fennorodiae G.E.Haglund
- Taraxacum ferale Kirschner & Štěpánek
- Taraxacum fernandezianum Dahlst.
- Taraxacum ferum Štěpánek & Kirschner
- Taraxacum fibratum Sonck
- Taraxacum fictum Hagend., Soest & Zevenb.
- Taraxacum filidens Hagend., Soest & Zevenb.
- Taraxacum fimbriatum Sonck
- Taraxacum finitimum Lundev. & H.Øllg.
- Taraxacum firmicaule Rail.
- Taraxacum firmum Dahlst.
- Taraxacum fissifolium Kirschner & Štěpánek
- Taraxacum flammeolum Kirschner & Štěpánek
- Taraxacum flandricum Hagend., Soest & Zevenb.
- Taraxacum flavescens G.E.Haglund
- Taraxacum flavidum Kirschner & Štěpánek
- Taraxacum flavipapposum Kirschner & Štěpánek
- Taraxacum flavostylum Back
- Taraxacum flavoviride Sonck
- Taraxacum flavum Soest
- Taraxacum flevoense Soest
- Taraxacum flexile G.E.Haglund
- Taraxacum floccosum Rail.
- Taraxacum floribundum R.Doll
- Taraxacum florstroemii Markl.
- Taraxacum florum Kirschner & Štěpánek
- Taraxacum flos-lacus Kirschner & Štěpánek
- Taraxacum flugum R.Doll
- Taraxacum flumineum R.Doll
- Taraxacum fluviatile Kirschner & Štěpánek
- Taraxacum font-queri Soest
- Taraxacum fontaniforme Soest
- Taraxacum fontanosquameum Soest
- Taraxacum fontanum Hand.-Mazz.
- Taraxacum forellense R.Doll
- Taraxacum formosissimum Kirschner & Štěpánek
- Taraxacum formosum Soest
- Taraxacum fornicatum Štěpánek & Kirschner
- Taraxacum forrestii Soest
- Taraxacum fragile Štěpánek & Kirschner
- Taraxacum fragosum Sonck
- Taraxacum fraudulentum Rail.
- Taraxacum freticola H.Øllg.
- Taraxacum fridenii Sahlin
- Taraxacum friesii Dahlst.
- Taraxacum frisicum Soest
- Taraxacum frondatum H.Øllg.
- Taraxacum frugale Hagend., Oosterv. & Zevenb. ex Hofstra
- Taraxacum fulgidum G.E.Haglund
- Taraxacum fulvescens Soest
- Taraxacum fulvicarpum Dahlst.
- Taraxacum fulviforme Dahlst.
- Taraxacum fulvobrunneum Soest
- Taraxacum fulvum Raunk.
- Taraxacum fuornense Soest
- Taraxacum furvum M.P.Christ.
- Taraxacum fusciflorum H.Øllg.
- Taraxacum fusco-olivaceum G.E.Haglund
- Taraxacum fusculinerve Markl.

== G ==
- Taraxacum gaditanum Talavera
- Taraxacum gaelorum A.J.Richards
- Taraxacum galbaniforme Dahlst. ex G.E.Haglund
- Taraxacum galbanum Dahlst.
- Taraxacum galeatum Dahlst.
- Taraxacum galeiferum M.P.Christ.
- Taraxacum galeifiguratum Rail.
- Taraxacum gallaecicum Soest
- Taraxacum gallicum Soest
- Taraxacum gamisansii Soest
- Taraxacum garbarianum Peruzzi, Aquaro, Caparelli & Raimondo
- Taraxacum gasparinii Tineo ex Lojac.
- Taraxacum geirhildae (Beeby) R.C.Palmer & W.Scott
- Taraxacum gelertii Raunk.
- Taraxacum gelertiiforme M.P.Christ.
- Taraxacum gelricum Soest
- Taraxacum geminatum G.E.Haglund
- Taraxacum geminidentatum Hudziok
- Taraxacum genargenteum Arrigoni
- Taraxacum gentile G.E.Haglund & Rail.
- Taraxacum germanicum Soest
- Taraxacum gesticulans H.Øllg.
- Taraxacum getulum Pomel
- Taraxacum gianninii Arrigoni, Ferretti & Padula
- Taraxacum gibberosum M.P.Christ.
- Taraxacum gibberum Markl.
- Taraxacum gibbiferum Brenner
- Taraxacum gibbosum Saarsoo
- Taraxacum giganteum H.Koidz.
- Taraxacum gilgitense Abedin
- Taraxacum gilliesii Hook. & Arn.
- Taraxacum gilvistigmatum Rail.
- Taraxacum gilvistylum Soest
- Taraxacum gilvum Rail.
- Taraxacum githagineum Kirschner & Štěpánek
- Taraxacum glabellum Schischk.
- Taraxacum glaberrimum R.Doll
- Taraxacum glabricaule Sonck
- Taraxacum glabrum DC.
- Taraxacum glaciale É.Huet & A.Huet ex Hand.-Mazz.
- Taraxacum gladiatum M.P.Christ.
- Taraxacum glandiforme Sonck
- Taraxacum glandonense Soest
- Taraxacum glaphyrum Sahlin
- Taraxacum glaucanthum (Ledeb.) DC.
- Taraxacum glauciniforme Dahlst.
- Taraxacum glaucinum Dahlst.
- Taraxacum glaucivirens Schischk.
- Taraxacum glaucolivaceum Kirschner & Štěpánek
- Taraxacum glaucophylloides Kirschner & Štěpánek
- Taraxacum glaucophyllum Soest
- Taraxacum globiceps Saarsoo
- Taraxacum glossocentrum Dahlst.
- Taraxacum glossodon Sonck & H.Øllg.
- Taraxacum glowackii H.Øllg.
- Taraxacum gnezdilloi Kovalevsk.
- Taraxacum goloskokovii Schischk.
- Taraxacum gorodkovii Kharkev. & Tzvelev
- Taraxacum gotlandicum (Dahlst.) Dahlst.
- Taraxacum gotoburgense Saarsoo & Borgv.
- Taraxacum gracilens Dahlst.
- Taraxacum graciliforme R.Doll
- Taraxacum gracilipes G.E.Haglund
- Taraxacum gracilisquameum Markl.
- Taraxacum gracilium R.Doll
- Taraxacum gracillimum Soest
- Taraxacum graecofontanum A.J.Richards & Sonck
- Taraxacum graecum Dahlst.
- Taraxacum graminicolor Soest
- Taraxacum grandidens M.P.Christ.
- Taraxacum grandiflorum Soest
- Taraxacum grandisquamum H.Koidz.
- Taraxacum graniticum Soest
- Taraxacum gratum Štěpánek, Kirschner & Meierott
- Taraxacum greuteri Štěpánek & Kirschner
- Taraxacum grootii Soest
- Taraxacum grossheimii Schischk.
- Taraxacum grossodentosum Rail.
- Taraxacum grossum Soest
- Taraxacum grypodiforme R.Doll
- Taraxacum grypodon Dahlst.
- Taraxacum grypolobum Sahlin
- Taraxacum guadalupense F.M.Vázquez
- Taraxacum guanchicum A.Galán, E.Linares & Vicente Orell.
- Taraxacum gulmargense Soest
- Taraxacum guntense Dengub.
- Taraxacum gurglense A.J.Richards
- Taraxacum gustavianum Sonck
- Taraxacum guttigestans H.Øllg. ex Kirschner & Štěpánek
- Taraxacum gyratum Rail.

== H ==
- Taraxacum haareanum Tzvelev
- Taraxacum habile Rail.
- Taraxacum haemanthum Kirschner & Štěpánek
- Taraxacum haematicum G.E.Haglund ex H.Øllg. & Wittzell
- Taraxacum haematopus H.Lindb.
- Taraxacum hahnii Uhlemann
- Taraxacum hallaisanense Nakai
- Taraxacum halophilum Regel
- Taraxacum hamatiforme Dahlst.
- Taraxacum hamatilobum Dahlst.
- Taraxacum hamatulum Hagend., Soest & Zevenb.
- Taraxacum hamatum Raunk.
- Taraxacum hamidens M.P.Christ.
- Taraxacum hamiferum Dahlst.
- Taraxacum hamosiforme Rail.
- Taraxacum hamosius R.Doll
- Taraxacum hamosum Dahlst.
- Taraxacum handelii Murr
- Taraxacum haptolepium Malmio
- Taraxacum haraldii Markl.
- Taraxacum harbhajan-singhii Soest
- Taraxacum harpagoides Sonck & H.Øllg.
- Taraxacum hastatiforme Soest
- Taraxacum hastile M.P.Christ.
- Taraxacum hastiliforme M.P.Christ.
- Taraxacum haussknechtii Uechtr.
- Taraxacum haworthianum Dudman & A.J.Richards
- Taraxacum hebelobum Hagend., Soest & Zevenb.
- Taraxacum hedinii G.E.Haglund ex Kirschner & Štěpánek
- Taraxacum heikkinenii Saarsoo
- Taraxacum heleocharis Kirschner & Štěpánek
- Taraxacum helianthum Soest
- Taraxacum helioscopium Kirschner & Štěpánek
- Taraxacum hellenicum Dahlst.
- Taraxacum helmi-emiliae Rail.
- Taraxacum helveticum Soest
- Taraxacum hemicyclum G.E.Haglund
- Taraxacum hempelianum Uhlemann
- Taraxacum hepaticolor Soest
- Taraxacum hepaticum Rail.
- Taraxacum heptapotamicum Schischk.
- Taraxacum herae Sonck
- Taraxacum hesperium C.C.Haw.
- Taraxacum heterolepis Nakai & Koidz. ex Kitag.
- Taraxacum heteroloma Hand.-Mazz.
- Taraxacum heterophylloides G.E.Haglund ex Soest
- Taraxacum heterophyllum Brenner
- Taraxacum heybroekii Soest
- Taraxacum hibernicola A.J.Richards
- Taraxacum hideoi Nakai
- Taraxacum hiemale Soest
- Taraxacum hilare Dahlst.
- Taraxacum hirsutissimum C.C.Haw.
- Taraxacum hirtellum Dahlst.
- Taraxacum hispanicum H.Lindb.
- Taraxacum hjeltii (Dahlst.) Dahlst.
- Taraxacum hohuanshanense S.S.Ying
- Taraxacum hollandicum Soest
- Taraxacum holmboei H.Lindb.
- Taraxacum holmenianum Sahlin
- Taraxacum holmgrenii G.E.Haglund
- Taraxacum homoschistum H.Øllg.
- Taraxacum honestum Štěpánek & Kirschner
- Taraxacum hooftii Soest
- Taraxacum hoplites M.P.Christ.
- Taraxacum horizontale Kirschner & Štěpánek
- Taraxacum horridifrons Rail.
- Taraxacum horridum Hagend., Soest & Zevenb.
- Taraxacum huddungense Lundev. & H.Øllg.
- Taraxacum huelphersianum Dahlst. ex G.E.Haglund
- Taraxacum humbertii Maire
- Taraxacum humidicola Kirschner & Štěpánek
- Taraxacum humifusum Štěpánek & Kirschner
- Taraxacum humile Brenner
- Taraxacum huterianum Soest
- Taraxacum hyberniforme Soest
- Taraxacum hybernum Steven
- Taraxacum hydrophilum Soest
- Taraxacum hygrophilum Soest
- Taraxacum hyoides Rail.
- Taraxacum hyoseridifolium Arv.-Touv. & Marcailhou
- Taraxacum hypanicum Tzvelev
- Taraxacum hyparcticum Dahlst.
- Taraxacum hyperoptum G.E.Haglund
- Taraxacum hypimbricans Kirschner & Štěpánek
- Taraxacum hypochaeris Dahlst.
- Taraxacum hypochoeroides G.E.Haglund
- Taraxacum hypocraterimorphum Rail.
- Taraxacum hypopolium Sahlin
- Taraxacum hyrynsalmense Saarsoo
- Taraxacum hystrix Kirschner & Štěpánek

== I ==
- Taraxacum iberanthum Sahlin
- Taraxacum ibericum Soest ex Masclans & Batalla
- Taraxacum icterinum Kirschner & Štěpánek
- Taraxacum idiolepium Markl.
- Taraxacum idiomorphum Markl.
- Taraxacum idiosomatum Rail.
- Taraxacum idlomorphoides Rail.
- Taraxacum ignivomum Kirschner & Štěpánek
- Taraxacum ikonnikovii Schischk.
- Taraxacum iliense Kirschner & Štěpánek
- Taraxacum illyricum Dahlst. ex Kirschner & Štěpánek
- Taraxacum imbricatius Kirschner & Štěpánek
- Taraxacum imitans H.Lindb. ex Såltin
- Taraxacum impolitum Rail.
- Taraxacum inaequilobum Pomel
- Taraxacum inane A.J.Richards
- Taraxacum inarmatum M.P.Christ.
- Taraxacum incantatum Štěpánek & Kirschner
- Taraxacum incisiforme Hagend., Soest & Zevenb.
- Taraxacum incisum Oellgaard
- Taraxacum inclinans G.E.Haglund ex Soest
- Taraxacum inclinorum A.J.Richards
- Taraxacum inclusum W.Koch ex Soest
- Taraxacum incomptum Hagend., Soest & Zevenb.
- Taraxacum inconspicuum Soest
- Taraxacum index Sonck
- Taraxacum indicum H.Lindberg.
- Taraxacum indigenum Kirschner & Štěpánek
- Taraxacum indivisum G.E.Haglund
- Taraxacum indulgens Kirschner & Štěpánek
- Taraxacum infestum Hagend., Soest & Zevenb.
- Taraxacum infidulum G.E.Haglund & Saarsoo
- Taraxacum informe G.E.Haglund ex Soest
- Taraxacum infradentatum Sonck
- Taraxacum infucatulum Sahlin
- Taraxacum infumatum G.E.Haglund
- Taraxacum infuscatum H.Øllg.
- Taraxacum ingens Palmgr.
- Taraxacum inimitabile Kirschner & Štěpánek
- Taraxacum inopinatum C.C.Haw.
- Taraxacum inops H.Øllg.
- Taraxacum insigne M.P.Christ. & Wiinst.
- Taraxacum insolitum Kirschner, Sonck & Štěpánek
- Taraxacum insubricum Soest
- Taraxacum insuetum M.P.Christ.
- Taraxacum insularum G.E.Haglund
- Taraxacum integriloboides Soest
- Taraxacum intercedens Markl.
- Taraxacum intermedium Raunk.
- Taraxacum interruptum Dahlst.
- Taraxacum interveniens G.E.Haglund
- Taraxacum intricatum H.Lindb.
- Taraxacum intumescens G.E.Haglund
- Taraxacum inundatum Kirschner & Štěpánek
- Taraxacum investiens Rail.
- Taraxacum invocatum Sonck
- Taraxacum involucratum Dahlst.
- Taraxacum involutum Rail.
- Taraxacum iranicum Soest
- Taraxacum irrigatum Kirschner & Štěpánek
- Taraxacum irritum Saarsoo
- Taraxacum irroratum Kirschner & Štěpánek
- Taraxacum ischnolepis Sahlin
- Taraxacum iseranum Soest
- Taraxacum islandicum Dahlst. ex M.P.Christ.
- Taraxacum isolobum M.P.Christ.
- Taraxacum isophyllum G.E.Haglund
- Taraxacum isthmicola H.Lindb.
- Taraxacum iucundum Štěpánek & Kirschner

== J ==
- Taraxacum jacuticum Tzvelev
- Taraxacum jailae Štěpánek & Kirschner
- Taraxacum janalamii Abedin
- Taraxacum janchenii Kirschner & Štěpánek
- Taraxacum japonicum Koidz.
- Taraxacum jaschilkuliense Vainberg
- Taraxacum javanicum Soest
- Taraxacum jemtlandicum Dahlst.
- Taraxacum jugiferum H.Øllg.
- Taraxacum junatovii Tzvelev
- Taraxacum junpeianum Kitam.
- Taraxacum jurassicum Soest
- Taraxacum jurtzevii Tzvelev
- Taraxacum juzepczukii Schischk.

== K ==
- Taraxacum kabulense Soest
- Taraxacum kalambakae Sonck
- Taraxacum kalchiainum Soest
- Taraxacum kaletkiniae Vainberg
- Taraxacum kamtchaticum Dahlst.
- Taraxacum karakoricum Soest
- Taraxacum karatavicum Pavlov
- Taraxacum karelicum H.Lindb. & Marklund
- Taraxacum karwendelense Sahlin
- Taraxacum kasachiforme R.Doll
- Taraxacum kasachum R.Doll
- Taraxacum kashmirense Soest
- Taraxacum kaskelenense Kirschner & Štěpánek
- Taraxacum kernianum Soest, Hagend. & Zevenb.
- Taraxacum ketoiense Tatew. & Kitam.
- Taraxacum kezmarkense R.Doll
- Taraxacum khatoonae Abedin
- Taraxacum kimuranum Kitam.
- Taraxacum kirghizicum Schischk.
- Taraxacum kirschneri Aquaro, Caparelli & Peruzzi
- Taraxacum kiushianum H.Koidz.
- Taraxacum kjellmanii Dahlst.
- Taraxacum kjellmaniiforme Soest
- Taraxacum klimesianum Kirschner & Štěpánek
- Taraxacum klingstedtii Sonck
- Taraxacum klopotovii Tzvelev
- Taraxacum koelzii Soest
- Taraxacum kojimae Kitam.
- Taraxacum kok-saghyz Rodin
- Taraxacum kolaense H.Lindb. ex Dahlst.
- Taraxacum kolymense Khokhryakov
- Taraxacum kondariense Vainberg
- Taraxacum korbii Soest
- Taraxacum korjakense Kharkev. & Tzvelev
- Taraxacum korjakorum Kharkev. & Tzvelev
- Taraxacum kornasii Soest
- Taraxacum kotschyi Soest
- Taraxacum kovalevskiae Vainberg
- Taraxacum kozlovii Tzvelev
- Taraxacum kraettlii Soest
- Taraxacum krameriense Sahlin
- Taraxacum krasnikovii M.S.Ivanova
- Taraxacum krasnoborovii Krasnikov
- Taraxacum krylovii Krasnikov & Khanm.
- Taraxacum kupfferi G.E.Haglund
- Taraxacum kurdiciforme G.E.Haglund
- Taraxacum kurdicum Hand.-Mazz. ex Nábělek
- Taraxacum kuusamoense H.Lindb. & Palmgr.
- Taraxacum kuvajevii Tzvelev
- Taraxacum kuzmanovii Štěpánek & Kirschner

== L ==
- Taraxacum laceratum (Brenner) Brenner
- Taraxacum lacerifolium G.E.Haglund
- Taraxacum lacerilobatum Saarsoo
- Taraxacum lacertosum Rail.
- Taraxacum lacianense A.Galán & Vicente Orell.
- Taraxacum laciniatulum Sahlin
- Taraxacum laciniatum Martrin-Donos
- Taraxacum laciniosifrons Dahlst. ex Wiinst.
- Taraxacum laciniosum Dahlst.
- Taraxacum lacinulatum Markl.
- Taraxacum lacistophylloides Dahlst.
- Taraxacum lacistophyllum (Dahlst.) Raunk.
- Taraxacum lacistrum Sahlin
- Taraxacum lactucifolium Kirschner & Štěpánek
- Taraxacum lacusculorum Kirschner & Štěpánek
- Taraxacum lacustre Soest
- Taraxacum laetecolorans Lindstr.
- Taraxacum laeticeps G.E.Haglund
- Taraxacum laeticolor Dahlst.
- Taraxacum laetiforme Dahlst.
- Taraxacum laetum Dahlst.
- Taraxacum lagerkrantzii G.E.Haglund
- Taraxacum lahulense Soest
- Taraxacum laiense Soest
- Taraxacum lambinonii Soest
- Taraxacum lamprolepis Kitag.
- Taraxacum lamprophyllum M.P.Christ.
- Taraxacum lancastriense A.J.Richards
- Taraxacum lanceolatisquameum Rail.
- Taraxacum lancidens Hagend., Soest & Zevenb.
- Taraxacum landmarkii Dahlst.
- Taraxacum langeanum Dahlst.
- Taraxacum languidulum Rail.
- Taraxacum languidum Markl.
- Taraxacum lanigerum Soest
- Taraxacum lanjouwii Soest
- Taraxacum larssonii Dahlst.
- Taraxacum lasianthum H.Koidz.
- Taraxacum lasiodasum Soest
- Taraxacum latebracteatum W.Koch ex Soest
- Taraxacum latens H.Øllg.
- Taraxacum latericulum R.Doll
- Taraxacum lateritium Dahlst.
- Taraxacum latibasis Soest
- Taraxacum laticaudatum Rail.
- Taraxacum laticonicum M.P.Christ.
- Taraxacum laticordatum Markl.
- Taraxacum latidens M.P.Christ.
- Taraxacum latifrons M.P.Christ.
- Taraxacum latihastatum M.P.Christ.
- Taraxacum latilobum DC.
- Taraxacum latisectum H.Lindb.
- Taraxacum latissimum Palmgr.
- Taraxacum latulum H.Øllg.
- Taraxacum laudabile H.Øllg. & J.Räsänen
- Taraxacum laurentianum Fernald
- Taraxacum lautellum Björk
- Taraxacum lawalreei Soest
- Taraxacum laxum G.E.Haglund
- Taraxacum lecitodes Dahlst. ex Hagl.
- Taraxacum ledebourii Kirschner & Štěpánek
- Taraxacum lehbertii H.Lindb. ex Pettersson & H.Lindb.
- Taraxacum lenense Tzvelev
- Taraxacum lenkoranense R.Doll
- Taraxacum lentiginosum H.Øllg.
- Taraxacum lentum Kirschner & Štěpánek
- Taraxacum leonardii Soest
- Taraxacum leonicum Soest ex M.Laínz
- Taraxacum leoninum Kirschner & Štěpánek
- Taraxacum leopardinum Štěpánek & Kirschner
- Taraxacum lepidum M.P.Christ.
- Taraxacum leptaleum M.P.Christ.
- Taraxacum leptocarpum Saarsoo
- Taraxacum leptoceras Dahlst.
- Taraxacum leptodon Markl.
- Taraxacum leptoglotte M.P.Christ.
- Taraxacum leptolepis M.P.Christ.
- Taraxacum leptophyllum H.Lindb. ex Såltin
- Taraxacum leptoscelum H.Øllg.
- Taraxacum leroyi Soest
- Taraxacum leucanthum (Ledeb.) Ledeb.
- Taraxacum leucocalymnum G.E.Haglund
- Taraxacum leucocarpum Jurtzev & Tzvelev
- Taraxacum leucocephalum M.P.Christ.
- Taraxacum leucochlorum Soest
- Taraxacum leucoglossum Brenner
- Taraxacum leucopodioides G.E.Haglund ex Soest
- Taraxacum leucopodum G.E.Haglund
- Taraxacum leucospermum Jord.
- Taraxacum leucosquameum Sonck
- Taraxacum leutianum Soest
- Taraxacum lidianum Soest
- Taraxacum ligerinum Sahlin
- Taraxacum lilacinum Krasn. ex Schischk.
- Taraxacum lilianae Aquaro, Caparelli & Peruzzi
- Taraxacum limbatum Dahlst.
- Taraxacum limburgense Hagend., Soest & Zevenb.
- Taraxacum limnanthes G.E.Haglund
- Taraxacum limnophilum Soest
- Taraxacum limnoticum A.J.Richards
- Taraxacum limosicola Kirschner & Štěpánek
- Taraxacum limosum Soest
- Taraxacum linczevskyi Schischk.
- Taraxacum lindstroemii Saarsoo & G.E.Haglund
- Taraxacum lineare Vorosch. & Schaga
- Taraxacum linearilobatum Rail.
- Taraxacum linearisquameum Soest
- Taraxacum linguatiforme Soest
- Taraxacum linguatifrons Markl.
- Taraxacum linguicuspis H.Lindb.
- Taraxacum lingulatum Markl.
- Taraxacum lingulilobum Sonck
- Taraxacum lissocarpum Dahlst.
- Taraxacum litardieri Soest
- Taraxacum litigiosum Kirschner & Štěpánek
- Taraxacum litophyllum De Langhe & Soest
- Taraxacum litorale Raunk.
- Taraxacum livonicum Markl.
- Taraxacum lobbichleri Soest
- Taraxacum lobulatum Brenner
- Taraxacum lofotense G.E.Haglund
- Taraxacum lojoense H.Lindb.
- Taraxacum lonchophyllum M.P.Christ.
- Taraxacum longicarpum Soest
- Taraxacum longicaudatum Rail.
- Taraxacum longiconicum H.Øllg.
- Taraxacum longicorne Dahlst.
- Taraxacum longicuspis Markl.
- Taraxacum longifrons G.E.Haglund
- Taraxacum longihastatum M.P.Christ.
- Taraxacum longipyramidatum Schischk.
- Taraxacum longisagittatum M.P.Christ.
- Taraxacum longisectum G.E.Haglund
- Taraxacum longispinulosum M.P.Christ.
- Taraxacum longisquameum H.Lindb.
- Taraxacum loratum M.P.Christ.
- Taraxacum lucense Arrigoni, Ferretti & Padula
- Taraxacum lucidepedatum Soest
- Taraxacum lucidiforme Hagend., Soest & Zevenb.
- Taraxacum lucidum Dahlst.
- Taraxacum luculentum Rail.
- Taraxacum ludlowii Soest
- Taraxacum ludmilae Kirschner & Štěpánek
- Taraxacum lugubre Dahlst.
- Taraxacum lugubriforme R.Doll
- Taraxacum lunare M.P.Christ.
- Taraxacum lundense H.Øllg. & Wittzell
- Taraxacum lundevallii Rail. & Sonck
- Taraxacum lunglungense Klimeš ex Kirschner & Štěpánek
- Taraxacum lupatiferum Rail.
- Taraxacum luridum G.E.Haglund
- Taraxacum lusitanicum Soest
- Taraxacum luteocucullatum W.Koch ex Soest
- Taraxacum luteodens M.P.Christ.
- Taraxacum luteolum G.E.Haglund ex Soest
- Taraxacum luteoviride M.P.Christ.
- Taraxacum lutescens Dahlst.
- Taraxacum luteum C.C.Haw. & A.J.Richards
- Taraxacum lutheri Såltin
- Taraxacum luxurians M.P.Christ.
- Taraxacum lyperum G.E.Haglund
- Taraxacum lyratum (Ledeb.) DC.

== M ==
- Taraxacum macilentum Dahlst.
- Taraxacum macranthoides G.E.Haglund
- Taraxacum macrocarpum H.Perss.
- Taraxacum macrocedens Rail.
- Taraxacum macrocentrum Dahlst.
- Taraxacum macroceras Dahlst.
- Taraxacum macroceratodon H.Øllg.
- Taraxacum macrochlamydeum Kovalevsk.
- Taraxacum macrodon Markl.
- Taraxacum macrolepium Schischk.
- Taraxacum macrolobum Dahlst.
- Taraxacum macromerum M.P.Christ.
- Taraxacum macrophyllarium Rail.
- Taraxacum macrotomum G.E.Haglund
- Taraxacum macula Kirschner & Štěpánek
- Taraxacum maculatum Jord.
- Taraxacum maculigerum H.Lindb.
- Taraxacum maculosum A.J.Richards
- Taraxacum madidum Kirschner & Štěpánek
- Taraxacum maeandriforme Rail.
- Taraxacum magadanicum Tzvelev
- Taraxacum magnesicum Sonck
- Taraxacum magnobliquum Soest
- Taraxacum magnodilatatum Soest
- Taraxacum magnolevigatum W.Koch ex Soest
- Taraxacum magnoligulatum Soest
- Taraxacum magnopyramidophorum Soest
- Taraxacum magnum Korol.
- Taraxacum mailleferi Soest
- Taraxacum majoricense A.Galán & L.Sáez
- Taraxacum majus Schischk.
- Taraxacum malato-belizii Soest
- Taraxacum malowitzum R.Doll
- Taraxacum malyi Soest
- Taraxacum mannoccii Carlesi & Peruzzi
- Taraxacum mansehracum Abedin
- Taraxacum maracandicum Kovalevsk.
- Taraxacum marchionii Soest
- Taraxacum margaritarium Kirschner & Štěpánek
- Taraxacum margettsii C.C.Haw.
- Taraxacum marginatum Dahlst.
- Taraxacum marginellum H.Lindb.
- Taraxacum marginiferum Kirschner & Štěpánek
- Taraxacum mariae J.Marciniuk & P.Marciniuk
- Taraxacum maricum Vašut, Kirschner & Štěpánek
- Taraxacum marklundii Palmgr.
- Taraxacum marmottae Sonck
- Taraxacum maroccanum H.Lindb.
- Taraxacum martellense Soest
- Taraxacum mastigophyllum Kirschner & Štěpánek
- Taraxacum mattmarkense Soest
- Taraxacum mauranthes Markl.
- Taraxacum maurocarpum Dahlst.
- Taraxacum maurocephalum Sonck
- Taraxacum maurophyllum Dahlst.
- Taraxacum maurostigma Markl.
- Taraxacum maurum G.E.Haglund
- Taraxacum mazzettii Soest
- Taraxacum medeense R.Doll
- Taraxacum medioximum Dahlst.
- Taraxacum mediterraneum Soest
- Taraxacum mediterraniforme Soest
- Taraxacum megalocarpum Soest
- Taraxacum megalophyllum G.E.Haglund
- Taraxacum megalosipteron Rail.
- Taraxacum meierottii Štěpánek & Kirschner
- Taraxacum meiseliae Soest
- Taraxacum melancholicum Kirschner & Štěpánek
- Taraxacum melanocephalum M.P.Christ.
- Taraxacum melanops Soest
- Taraxacum melanospilum Štěpánek & Kirschner
- Taraxacum melanostigma H.Lindb.
- Taraxacum melanostylum T.C.E.Fr.
- Taraxacum melanthoides M.P.Christ. & Wiinst.
- Taraxacum melittostylum H.Øllg.
- Taraxacum melleum Soest
- Taraxacum melzerianum Soest
- Taraxacum memorabile Kirschner & Štěpánek
- Taraxacum mendax Kirschner & Štěpánek
- Taraxacum merinoi Soest
- Taraxacum × mesohalobium Kirschner & Štěpánek
- Taraxacum messanense H.Lindb.
- Taraxacum metriocallosum Soest
- Taraxacum mexicanum DC.
- Taraxacum meyeri Sonck
- Taraxacum micans Dahlst. ex G.E.Haglund
- Taraxacum microcarpum H.Lindb.
- Taraxacum microcephaloides Soest
- Taraxacum microcranum Markl.
- Taraxacum microdon Rail.
- Taraxacum microlobum Markl.
- Taraxacum microspermum Schischk.
- Taraxacum miltinum Sahlin
- Taraxacum mimosinum Sahlin
- Taraxacum mimuloides H.Lindb.
- Taraxacum mimulum Dahlst. ex H.Lindb.
- Taraxacum miniatum H.Lindb.
- Taraxacum minimum (V.Brig.) N.Terracc.
- Taraxacum minuticarpum Kirschner & Štěpánek
- Taraxacum minutilobum Popov ex Kovalevsk.
- Taraxacum minutissimum Soest
- Taraxacum mirabile Wagenitz
- Taraxacum mirosquamatum Rail.
- Taraxacum miserum M.P.Christ.
- Taraxacum mitalii Soest
- Taraxacum miyakei Kitam.
- Taraxacum modestum Schischk.
- Taraxacum moldavicum V.Chán, H.Øllg., Štěpánek, Trávn. & Žíla
- Taraxacum molybdinum Dahlst. ex G.E.Haglund
- Taraxacum molybdolepis Dahlst.
- Taraxacum mongolicum Hand.-Mazz.
- Taraxacum mongoliforme R.Doll
- Taraxacum monochlamydeum Hand.-Mazz.
- Taraxacum monochroum G.E.Haglund
- Taraxacum monotropum Sahlin
- Taraxacum montellii H.Lindb. ex Sonck
- Taraxacum montesignum Soest
- Taraxacum montserratii Sahlin
- Taraxacum moriceps G.E.Haglund
- Taraxacum morulum G.E.Haglund ex Soest
- Taraxacum mosciense Dahlst.
- Taraxacum mucronatum H.Lindb.
- Taraxacum mucroniferum M.P.Christ.
- Taraxacum mucronulatum Soest
- Taraxacum mujense Petrochenko
- Taraxacum multicolorans Hagend., Soest & Zevenb.
- Taraxacum multidentatum Soest
- Taraxacum multidenticulatum Soest
- Taraxacum multifidum G.E.Haglund
- Taraxacum multiglossum Mart.Schmid
- Taraxacum multijugum W.Koch ex Soest
- Taraxacum multilaciniatum Arrigoni
- Taraxacum multilepis Kirschner & Štěpánek
- Taraxacum multiscaposum Schischk.
- Taraxacum multisinuatum Kirschner, Sonck & Štěpánek
- Taraxacum mundulum Rail.
- Taraxacum murgabicum Vainberg
- Taraxacum murmanicum N.I.Orlova
- Taraxacum musalae Štěpánek & Kirschner
- Taraxacum musteum Štěpánek & Kirschner
- Taraxacum mutabile Saarsoo
- Taraxacum mutatum Kirschner & Štěpánek

== N ==
- Taraxacum naevosiforme Dahlst.
- Taraxacum nagaricum Soest
- Taraxacum nairoense H.Koidz.
- Taraxacum nambuense H.Koidz.
- Taraxacum nanaunii Jurtzev
- Taraxacum nannophyes Rail.
- Taraxacum nanulum Sonck
- Taraxacum nanum Soest
- Taraxacum nasirii Soest
- Taraxacum navacerradense A.J.Richards
- Taraxacum navarrense Sonck
- Taraxacum necessarium H.Øllg.
- Taraxacum nectaristigmatum Rail.
- Taraxacum nematolobum M.P.Christ.
- Taraxacum nemorum G.E.Haglund
- Taraxacum neoaellenii Soest
- Taraxacum neokamtschaticum Vorosch.
- Taraxacum neolobulatum Soest
- Taraxacum neosachalinense H.Koidz.
- Taraxacum neosivaschicum Tzvelev
- Taraxacum neospurium Soest
- Taraxacum nepalense Soest
- Taraxacum neuolobum Soest
- Taraxacum nevadense H.Lindb.
- Taraxacum nevskii Juz.
- Taraxacum nietoi A.J.Richards
- Taraxacum nigrescens H.Øllg.
- Taraxacum nigricans (Kit.) Rchb.
- Taraxacum nigridentatum T.Edm.
- Taraxacum nigritum Soest
- Taraxacum nigrocephalum A.P.Khokhr.
- Taraxacum nigrofructum Kirschner & Štěpánek
- Taraxacum nigrum Soest
- Taraxacum nikolai Vainberg
- Taraxacum nitens G.E.Haglund
- Taraxacum nitidiorum Soest
- Taraxacum nitidum Hagend., Soest & Zevenb.
- Taraxacum nitrophilum G.E.Haglund
- Taraxacum nivale Lange ex Kihlm.
- Taraxacum niveum Kirschner & Štěpánek
- Taraxacum nobile Kirschner & Štěpánek
- Taraxacum nordhagenii G.E.Haglund
- Taraxacum nordstedtii Dahlst.
- Taraxacum norvegicum (Dahlst.) Dahlst.
- Taraxacum notabile H.Øllg.
- Taraxacum noterophilum Kirschner, Sonck & Štěpánek
- Taraxacum nothum Hagend., Soest & Zevenb.
- Taraxacum novae-zemliae Holmboe
- Taraxacum novoburgense Soest
- Taraxacum nubilum Hagend., Soest & Zevenb.
- Taraxacum nudiscaposum Vorosch.
- Taraxacum nudum Soest
- Taraxacum nuratavicum Schischk.
- Taraxacum nutans Dahlst.
- Taraxacum nylandicum Sonck & H.Øllg.

== O ==
- Taraxacum obitsiense Sahlin
- Taraxacum obliquiforme Rail.
- Taraxacum obliquilobum Dahlst.
- Taraxacum obliquum Dahlst.
- Taraxacum oblongatum Dahlst.
- Taraxacum obnubilum Puol.
- Taraxacum obnuptum Lundev. & H.Øllg.
- Taraxacum obovatifolium Soest
- Taraxacum obovatifrons M.P.Christ.
- Taraxacum obovatum (Willd.) DC.
- Taraxacum obscuratum Dahlst.
- Taraxacum obscurum Štěpánek & Kirschner
- Taraxacum obtextum Rail.
- Taraxacum obtusatum Dahlst.
- Taraxacum obtusifrons Markl.
- Taraxacum obtusilobum Dahlst.
- Taraxacum obtusiusculum H.Lindb.
- Taraxacum obtusulum H.Lindb.
- Taraxacum obtusum (Soest) R.Doll
- Taraxacum obuncum Kirschner & Štěpánek
- Taraxacum occidentale Dahlst.
- Taraxacum occultum Kirschner & Štěpánek
- Taraxacum ochotense Vorosch.
- Taraxacum ochraceistigmatum Rail.
- Taraxacum ochrocarpum (Soest) J.-M.Tison
- Taraxacum ochrochloroides Rail.
- Taraxacum ochrochlorum G.E.Haglund
- Taraxacum ochrospermum Soest
- Taraxacum oddense Lundev.
- Taraxacum odibile Kirschner & Štěpánek
- Taraxacum odiosum Kirschner & Štěpánek
- Taraxacum oelandicum (G.E.Haglund) H.Øllg.
- Taraxacum oellgaardii C.C.Haw.
- Taraxacum ohirense S.Watan. & Morita
- Taraxacum ohlsenii G.E.Haglund
- Taraxacum ohritense Sonck
- Taraxacum oinopolepis Dahlst.
- Taraxacum oinopopodum Sahlin
- Taraxacum oistophorum Markl.
- Taraxacum olgae A.J.Richards
- Taraxacum oliganthum Hand.-Mazz.
- Taraxacum oligolobatum Sahlin
- Taraxacum oligophyllum Brenner
- Taraxacum olitorium G.E.Haglund
- Taraxacum olivaceoides Soest
- Taraxacum olivaceum Soest
- Taraxacum olympicola Sonck
- Taraxacum olympophilum Sonck
- Taraxacum omissum G.E.Haglund
- Taraxacum onychodontum Dahlst.
- Taraxacum ooststroomii Soest
- Taraxacum opaciforme Dahlst. ex G.E.Haglund
- Taraxacum opacum (Dahlst.) Dahlst.
- Taraxacum opeatolobum Dahlst.
- Taraxacum opertum H.Øllg.
- Taraxacum oplilobum Soest
- Taraxacum oppidanum Sonck
- Taraxacum optimae Aquaro, Caparelli & Peruzzi
- Taraxacum opulens Rail.
- Taraxacum opulentiforme Sahlin
- Taraxacum orbicans G.E.Haglund
- Taraxacum orcadense Dahlst.
- Taraxacum ordinatum Hagend., Soest & Zevenb.
- Taraxacum oreades Štěpánek & Kirschner
- Taraxacum oreinicola Soest
- Taraxacum oreinopsis G.E.Haglund ex Sonck
- Taraxacum oreinum G.E.Haglund
- Taraxacum oreophilum G.E.Haglund
- Taraxacum orientale Kirschner & Štěpánek
- Taraxacum orientali-atratum Kirschner & Štěpánek
- Taraxacum ornatum G.E.Haglund
- Taraxacum ossiclivosum J.Räsänen
- Taraxacum ostenfeldii Raunk.
- Taraxacum ostrinum M.P.Christ.
- Taraxacum otagirianum Koidz. ex Kitam.
- Taraxacum ottonis Uhlemann
- Taraxacum ovatum Kirschner & Štěpánek
- Taraxacum ovcinnikovii Vainberg
- Taraxacum ovillum H.Øllg.
- Taraxacum oxycentrum Markl.
- Taraxacum oxyglotte M.P.Christ.
- Taraxacum oxylobium Brenner
- Taraxacum oxyonchum Rail.
- Taraxacum oxyphoreum M.P.Christ.
- Taraxacum oxyrhinum Sahlin

== P ==
- Taraxacum pacheri Sch.Bip.
- Taraxacum pachylobum Dahlst.
- Taraxacum pachymeroides Hagend., Soest & Zevenb.
- Taraxacum pachymerum G.E.Haglund
- Taraxacum pachypodum H.Lindb.
- Taraxacum pakistanicum Soest
- Taraxacum pallens H.Lindb. ex Pettersson & H.Lindb.
- Taraxacum pallescens Dahlst.
- Taraxacum pallescentiforme Soest
- Taraxacum pallidilateritium M.P.Christ.
- Taraxacum pallidipapposum Soest
- Taraxacum pallidipes Markl.
- Taraxacum pallidisquameum Soest
- Taraxacum pallidissimum Soest
- Taraxacum pallidulum H.Lindb.
- Taraxacum pallidum Kirschner & Štěpánek
- Taraxacum palmeri W.Scott & T.C.G.Rich
- Taraxacum palmgrenii H.Øllg.
- Taraxacum palpitans Kirschner & Štěpánek
- Taraxacum paludem-ornans Kirschner & Štěpánek
- Taraxacum paludosiforme R.Doll
- Taraxacum paludosum (Scop.) Crépin
- Taraxacum palustre (Lyons) Symons
- Taraxacum palustrisquameum A.J.Richards
- Taraxacum palvae Rail.
- Taraxacum panalpinum Soest
- Taraxacum pandum Štěpánek & Kirschner
- Taraxacum panhellenicum Sonck
- Taraxacum pankhurstianum A.J.Richards & Ferguson-Smyth
- Taraxacum pannonicum Sonck & Soest
- Taraxacum pannucium Dahlst.
- Taraxacum pannulatiforme Dahlst.
- Taraxacum pannulatum Dahlst.
- Taraxacum panoplum Sahlin
- Taraxacum papposum R.Doll
- Taraxacum paradoxachrum Soest
- Taraxacum parallelum Kirschner & Štěpánek
- Taraxacum parasemum G.E.Haglund & Saarsoo
- Taraxacum parciflorum Brenner
- Taraxacum pardinum M.P.Christ.
- Taraxacum parile M.P.Christ.
- Taraxacum parnassicum Dahlst.
- Taraxacum parsennense Soest
- Taraxacum parvilobum Dahlst.
- Taraxacum parvuliforme Soest
- Taraxacum parvulum DC.
- Taraxacum pastiniferum Rail.
- Taraxacum pastorum Štěpánek & Kirschner
- Taraxacum patagiferum Rail.
- Taraxacum patagonicum Uhlemann
- Taraxacum patens (Dahlst.) Dahlst.
- Taraxacum pateriforme Rail.
- Taraxacum patibuliferum Rail.
- Taraxacum patiens Kirschner & Štěpánek
- Taraxacum paucidentatiforme Soest
- Taraxacum paucidentatum Soest
- Taraxacum paucijugum Markl.
- Taraxacum paucilacerum Saarsoo
- Taraxacum paucilobum Hudziok
- Taraxacum pauckertianum Hudziok
- Taraxacum paullum Rail.
- Taraxacum pavlovii Orazova
- Taraxacum pawlodarskum R.Doll
- Taraxacum pawlowskii Soest
- Taraxacum peccator Kirschner & Štěpánek
- Taraxacum pectinatiforme H.Lindb.
- Taraxacum pectinatum Kitam.
- Taraxacum pedemontanum Soest
- Taraxacum pedrottii Soest
- Taraxacum peliogoniatum Sahlin
- Taraxacum penelobum Sahlin
- Taraxacum penicilliforme H.Lindb.
- Taraxacum penyalarense A.Galán, E.Linares & Vicente Orell.
- Taraxacum peraccommodatum Rail.
- Taraxacum peralatum Soest
- Taraxacum peramplum Rail.
- Taraxacum perattenuatum H.Lindb.
- Taraxacum percurvatum Kirschner & Štěpánek
- Taraxacum perdeflexum G.E.Haglund
- Taraxacum perdevexum M.P.Christ.
- Taraxacum peregrinum G.E.Haglund & Soest
- Taraxacum perenne Kirschner & Štěpánek
- Taraxacum perfiljevii N.I.Orlova
- Taraxacum perfissum Soest
- Taraxacum pergracile M.P.Christ.
- Taraxacum perincisum (Rigo ex Murr) Murr
- Taraxacum perlatescens Dahlst.
- Taraxacum perminiatum Soest
- Taraxacum perplexans Kirschner & Štěpánek
- Taraxacum perpusillum Schischk.
- Taraxacum perrigidum Sonck
- Taraxacum persicum Soest
- Taraxacum persimile Dahlst.
- Taraxacum persquamulosum Kirschner & Štěpánek
- Taraxacum perssonii Plaglund ex Sahlin & Soest
- Taraxacum pertenue Kirschner & Štěpánek
- Taraxacum pervalidum Rail.
- Taraxacum petiolulatum (Huter) Soest
- Taraxacum petri-primi Vainberg
- Taraxacum petrovskyi Tzvelev
- Taraxacum petterssonii Markl.
- Taraxacum phalarocephalum G.E.Haglund
- Taraxacum phaleratum G.E.Haglund
- Taraxacum philokalos Kirschner & Štěpánek
- Taraxacum phitosii Soest
- Taraxacum phoenicolepis Soest
- Taraxacum pholidocarpum Dahlst.
- Taraxacum phymatocarpum J.Vahl
- Taraxacum picatidens Markl.
- Taraxacum piceaticeps Dahlst.
- Taraxacum piceatiforme Soest
- Taraxacum piceatifrons Sahlin
- Taraxacum piceatum Dahlst.
- Taraxacum piceipictum Sahlin
- Taraxacum pictidum Rail.
- Taraxacum pictum Štěpánek & Kirschner
- Taraxacum pieninicum Pawł.
- Taraxacum pietii-oosterveldii H.Øllg.
- Taraxacum pilatense Soest
- Taraxacum pilicatum Soest
- Taraxacum pilosella Lundev. & H.Øllg.
- Taraxacum pilosum Döll
- Taraxacum piluliferum G.E.Haglund ex Soest
- Taraxacum pindicola (Bald.) Hand.-Mazz.
- Taraxacum pindicum Kirschner & Štěpánek
- Taraxacum pingue Schischk.
- Taraxacum pinnatifidum Soest
- Taraxacum pinto-silvae Soest
- Taraxacum pirinicum Štěpánek & Kirschner
- Taraxacum pittochromatum Sahlin
- Taraxacum placibile G.E.Haglund
- Taraxacum placidum A.J.Richards
- Taraxacum planifrons M.P.Christ.
- Taraxacum planoides Hagend., Soest & Zevenb.
- Taraxacum planum Raunk.
- Taraxacum platycarpum Dahlst.
- Taraxacum platycranum Dahlst.
- Taraxacum platyglossum Raunk.
- Taraxacum platylepium Dahlst.
- Taraxacum platylobum Dahlst.
- Taraxacum platypecidum Diels
- Taraxacum platyphyllinum Rail.
- Taraxacum platyphyllum Dahlst. ex G.E.Haglund
- Taraxacum pleniceps Markl.
- Taraxacum plicatiangulatum Rail.
- Taraxacum plicatifrons Saarsoo
- Taraxacum plicatulum Soest
- Taraxacum ploegii Hagend., Soest & Zevenb.
- Taraxacum plovdivense R.Doll
- Taraxacum plumbeum Dahlst.
- Taraxacum podlachiacum H.Øllg.
- Taraxacum podlechianum Sahlin
- Taraxacum poecilostictum G.E.Haglund
- Taraxacum pohlii Soest
- Taraxacum polatschekii Soest
- Taraxacum poliochloroides R.Doll
- Taraxacum poliochlorum Dahlst.
- Taraxacum poliomelanum G.E.Haglund
- Taraxacum poliophytum G.E.Haglund
- Taraxacum polium Dahlst.
- Taraxacum pollichii Soest
- Taraxacum pollinense Aquaro, Caparelli & Peruzzi
- Taraxacum polonicum Małecka & Soest
- Taraxacum polozhiae Kurbatski
- Taraxacum polycercum Sahlin
- Taraxacum polyhamatum H.Øllg.
- Taraxacum polyodon Dahlst.
- Taraxacum polyschistum Dahlst.
- Taraxacum polytomum Saarsoo
- Taraxacum polyxanthum Dahlst.
- Taraxacum pomelianum Dobignard
- Taraxacum pomposum Štěpánek & Kirschner
- Taraxacum poodes Sahlin
- Taraxacum popovii Kovalevsk. ex Vainberg
- Taraxacum porcellisinus Sonck & H.Øllg.
- Taraxacum porphyranthum Boiss.
- Taraxacum porrectidens Dahlst.
- Taraxacum porrigens Markl. ex Puol.
- Taraxacum porrigentilobatum Rail.
- Taraxacum portentosum Kirschner & Štěpánek
- Taraxacum porteri C.C.Haw.
- Taraxacum pospelovii Tzvelev & E.B.Pospelova
- Taraxacum potaninii Tzvelev
- Taraxacum potor Kirschner & Štěpánek
- Taraxacum praecox Puol.
- Taraxacum praegracilens Sonck
- Taraxacum praeradians Dahlst.
- Taraxacum praeradiantifrons Dahlst.
- Taraxacum praesigne Sahlin
- Taraxacum praestabile Rail.
- Taraxacum praestans H.Lindb.
- Taraxacum praetervisum Kirschner & Štěpánek
- Taraxacum praeticum Soest
- Taraxacum prasinescens G.E.Haglund
- Taraxacum prasinum Sahlin
- Taraxacum praterense Sahlin
- Taraxacum prati-lucense Arrigoni
- Taraxacum praticola Dahlst.
- Taraxacum pravicentrum M.P.Christ.
- Taraxacum pravum M.P.Christ.
- Taraxacum prilipkoi Czerep.
- Taraxacum primigenium Hand.-Mazz.
- Taraxacum princeps Vašut & Trávn.
- Taraxacum prionum Hagend., Soest & Zevenb.
- Taraxacum privum Dahlst.
- Taraxacum procerisquameum H.Øllg.
- Taraxacum procerum G.E.Haglund
- Taraxacum proclinatum Rail.
- Taraxacum prominens Markl.
- Taraxacum pronilobum H.Øllg.
- Taraxacum propinquum G.E.Haglund
- Taraxacum proruptum Rail.
- Taraxacum proteranthium Rail.
- Taraxacum protervum Sonck
- Taraxacum protractifolium G.E.Haglund
- Taraxacum protuberans Kirschner & Štěpánek
- Taraxacum providens Soest
- Taraxacum proximiforme Soest
- Taraxacum proximum (Dahlst.) Dahlst.
- Taraxacum pruinatum M.P.Christ.
- Taraxacum przevalskii Tzvelev
- Taraxacum psammophilum (G.E.Haglund) Saarsoo
- Taraxacum pseudacrolobum Hagend., Soest & Zevenb.
- Taraxacum pseudelongatum Soest
- Taraxacum pseudoalaskanum Jurtzev
- Taraxacum pseudoalpestre Štěpánek & Kirschner
- Taraxacum pseudoatratum Orazova
- Taraxacum pseudobalticum Soest
- Taraxacum pseudobicorne Soest
- Taraxacum pseudobithynicum Gürdal, Štěpánek, Zeisek, Kirschner & Özhatay
- Taraxacum pseudoboreigenum Soest
- Taraxacum pseudobrachyglossum Soest
- Taraxacum pseudobrevirostre Vainberg
- Taraxacum pseudobulgaricum Štěpánek & Kirschner
- Taraxacum pseudocalanthodium Kirschner & Štěpánek
- Taraxacum pseudocalocephalum Soest
- Taraxacum pseudocastaneum Soest
- Taraxacum pseudodilatatum Soest
- Taraxacum pseudodissimile Soest
- Taraxacum pseudodunense Soest
- Taraxacum pseudoeriopodum Soest
- Taraxacum pseudoglabrum Dahlst.
- Taraxacum pseudogracilens R.Doll
- Taraxacum pseudohabile K.Jung, Meierott & Sackwitz
- Taraxacum pseudohamatum Dahlst.
- Taraxacum pseudohirtellum Dahlst. ex G.E.Haglund
- Taraxacum pseudohoppeanum Kirschner & Štěpánek
- Taraxacum pseudokuluense Kirschner & Štěpánek
- Taraxacum pseudolandmarkii Franco & Rocha Afonso
- Taraxacum pseudolarssonii A.J.Richards
- Taraxacum pseudolaxum R.Doll
- Taraxacum pseudoleucanthum Soest
- Taraxacum pseudolilacinum Kirschner & Štěpánek
- Taraxacum pseudolobulatum R.Doll
- Taraxacum pseudolugubre R.Doll
- Taraxacum pseudomarklundii Soest
- Taraxacum pseudominutilobum Kovalevsk.
- Taraxacum pseudomurbeckianum Tzvelev
- Taraxacum pseudonigricans Hand.-Mazz.
- Taraxacum pseudonivale Malyschev
- Taraxacum pseudonordstedtii A.J.Richards
- Taraxacum pseudonutans Kirschner & Štěpánek
- Taraxacum pseudopalustre Murr
- Taraxacum pseudopaucilobum Kirschner & Štěpánek
- Taraxacum pseudophaleratum R.Doll
- Taraxacum pseudoplatylepium Jurtzev
- Taraxacum pseudoporphyranthum Kirschner & Štěpánek
- Taraxacum pseudoporrigens Sonck
- Taraxacum pseudopraecox Kirschner & Štěpánek
- Taraxacum pseudoproximum Soest
- Taraxacum pseudopulchrum Kirschner & Štěpánek
- Taraxacum pseudopyrenaicum Soest
- Taraxacum pseudorecognitum Štěpánek & Kirschner
- Taraxacum pseudorecurvum Soest
- Taraxacum pseudoretroflexum M.P.Christ.
- Taraxacum pseudoroseum Schischk.
- Taraxacum pseudosilesiacum R.Doll
- Taraxacum pseudosplendens Štěpánek & Kirschner
- Taraxacum pseudostenoceras Soest
- Taraxacum pseudostenolepium Soest
- Taraxacum pseudostenoschistum G.E.Haglund
- Taraxacum pseudostevenii Soest
- Taraxacum pseudosuecicum Kirschner & Štěpánek
- Taraxacum pseudosumneviczii Kirschner & Štěpánek
- Taraxacum pseudotenebristylum Soest
- Taraxacum pseudotianschanicum R.Doll
- Taraxacum pterygoideum Rail.
- Taraxacum ptilotoides Sahlin
- Taraxacum pubens Soest
- Taraxacum puberulum G.E.Haglund
- Taraxacum pubescens Fr.
- Taraxacum pubicaule Soest
- Taraxacum pudicum Vašut & Majeský
- Taraxacum pudilii Štěpánek & Kirschner
- Taraxacum pugioniferum Björk
- Taraxacum pugiunculum Rail.
- Taraxacum pulchellum Kirschner & Štěpánek
- Taraxacum pulcherrimum H.Lindb.
- Taraxacum pulchricurvum Back
- Taraxacum pulchriflos Klimeš ex Kirschner & Štěpánek
- Taraxacum pulchrifolium Markl.
- Taraxacum pullocarpum Soest
- Taraxacum pullum Markl. ex Puol.
- Taraxacum pulverulentum H.Øllg.
- Taraxacum puniceum Sahlin
- Taraxacum puolannei Markl. ex Puol.
- Taraxacum purpurei-petiolatum Soest
- Taraxacum purpureocornutum Soest
- Taraxacum purpureomarginatum Soest
- Taraxacum purpureum Raunk.
- Taraxacum purpuridens Dahlst.
- Taraxacum putidiusculum Rail.
- Taraxacum putum Såltin
- Taraxacum pycnocarpum G.E.Haglund
- Taraxacum pycnocedens Rail.
- Taraxacum pycnodon Brenner
- Taraxacum pycnoforme Rail.
- Taraxacum pycnolobum Dahlst.
- Taraxacum pycnoschistum Dahlst.
- Taraxacum pycnostictum M.P.Christ.
- Taraxacum pyrenaicum Reut.
- Taraxacum pyrochroma Soest
- Taraxacum pyropappum Boiss. & Reut.
- Taraxacum pyroporum Soest
- Taraxacum pyrranthes Sonck & Soest

== Q ==
- Taraxacum qaiseri Abedin
- Taraxacum qirae D.T.Zhai & C.H.An
- Taraxacum quadrangulum Rail.
- Taraxacum quadrans H.Øllg.
- Taraxacum quaesitum Kirschner & Štěpánek
- Taraxacum quettacum Abedin

== R ==
- Taraxacum radens Sonck
- Taraxacum radinum Sonck
- Taraxacum radiosum Dahlst.
- Taraxacum radmilae Štěpánek & Kirschner
- Taraxacum ragnar-baeckii Rail.
- Taraxacum raii (Gouan) Gray
- Taraxacum raikoviae Vainberg
- Taraxacum railonsalae G.E.Haglund & Saarsoo
- Taraxacum ranarium Kirschner & Štěpánek
- Taraxacum rangiferinum Sonck & H.Øllg.
- Taraxacum ranunculus Kirschner & Štěpánek
- Taraxacum rasuloviae Vainberg
- Taraxacum recessum Hagend., Soest & Zevenb.
- Taraxacum reclinatum M.P.Christ.
- Taraxacum recognitum Štěpánek & Kirschner
- Taraxacum recurvidens Dahlst.
- Taraxacum recurvum Dahlst.
- Taraxacum refectum Sonck
- Taraxacum reflectens Dahlst.
- Taraxacum reichenbachii (Huter) Dahlst.
- Taraxacum reichlingii Soest
- Taraxacum reinthalii Markl.
- Taraxacum remanens G.E.Haglund
- Taraxacum remanentilobum Soest
- Taraxacum remotilobum Dahlst.
- Taraxacum renosense Soest
- Taraxacum reophilum Soest
- Taraxacum repandum Pavlov
- Taraxacum repletum Dahlst.
- Taraxacum replicatum Hagend., Soest & Zevenb.
- Taraxacum resectum Rail.
- Taraxacum respersum Sonck
- Taraxacum retortum Soest
- Taraxacum retroflexum H.Lindb.
- Taraxacum retroversum Dahlst.
- Taraxacum retzii Soest
- Taraxacum revalense H.Lindb. ex Eklund
- Taraxacum revertitans Greuter
- Taraxacum revolutum G.E.Haglund
- Taraxacum rhaeticum Soest
- Taraxacum rhamphodes G.E.Haglund
- Taraxacum rhodocarpum Dahlst.
- Taraxacum rhodolepis Dahlst.
- Taraxacum rhodoneuron Dahlst.
- Taraxacum rhodopaeum Štěpánek & Kirschner
- Taraxacum rhodopodum M.P.Christ. & Wiinst.
- Taraxacum rhomboideum M.P.Christ.
- Taraxacum rhusiolepium Markl. ex H.Øllg. & J.Räsänen
- Taraxacum ribii D.P.Petit
- Taraxacum richardsianum C.C.Haw.
- Taraxacum rigens Hagend., Soest & Zevenb.
- Taraxacum rigescens Sonck
- Taraxacum rigidifolium Sonck
- Taraxacum rigidipes Sonck
- Taraxacum rigidum Soest
- Taraxacum riparium Štěpánek, Kirschner, P.Kirchm. & Meierott
- Taraxacum rivale R.Doll
- Taraxacum rivulare Soest
- Taraxacum rizaense R.Doll
- Taraxacum roborovskyi Tzvelev
- Taraxacum robustiosum Rail.
- Taraxacum robustisquameum Rail.
- Taraxacum ronae Margetts
- Taraxacum rorippa Soest
- Taraxacum roseiflos Kirschner & Štěpánek
- Taraxacum roseocarpum Soest
- Taraxacum roseoflavescens Tzvelev
- Taraxacum roseolepis Soest
- Taraxacum roseolum Kirschner & Štěpánek
- Taraxacum roseopedatum Soest
- Taraxacum roseopes K.Jung, Meierott & Sackwitz
- Taraxacum roseum Bornm. ex Hand.-Mazz.
- Taraxacum rostochiensis R.Doll
- Taraxacum rotundatum Markl.
- Taraxacum rubellum M.P.Christ.
- Taraxacum ruberuliforme Soest
- Taraxacum ruberulum Dahlst. & Borgv.
- Taraxacum rubicundum (Dahlst.) Dahlst.
- Taraxacum rubidipes G.E.Haglund
- Taraxacum rubidum Schischk.
- Taraxacum rubifolium Rasmussen
- Taraxacum rubiginans Dahlst.
- Taraxacum rubiginosum Dahlst.
- Taraxacum rubricatum Štěpánek & Kirschner
- Taraxacum rubrisquameum M.P.Christ.
- Taraxacum rubro-lineatum H.Lindb.
- Taraxacum rufinervosum Soest
- Taraxacum rufocarpoides Soest
- Taraxacum rufocarpum Soest
- Taraxacum rufofructum A.J.Richards
- Taraxacum rufonerve Soest
- Taraxacum rufulum Soest
- Taraxacum rufum Dahlst.
- Taraxacum rumelicum Štěpánek & Kirschner
- Taraxacum rupicaprae Štěpánek & Kirschner
- Taraxacum rupicola Yıldırım
- Taraxacum ruptifolium H.Øllg.
- Taraxacum russum Kirschner & Štěpánek
- Taraxacum rutilum Kirschner & Štěpánek

== S ==
- Taraxacum saarsooanum G.E.Haglund
- Taraxacum saasense Soest
- Taraxacum sabaudum Soest
- Taraxacum sacrificatum Sonck
- Taraxacum saetigerum Saarsoo
- Taraxacum saevum Štěpánek & Kirschner
- Taraxacum sagittifolium H.Lindb.
- Taraxacum sagittifrons M.P.Christ.
- Taraxacum sagittilobum W.Koch ex Soest
- Taraxacum sagittipotens Dahlst. & Ohlsén
- Taraxacum sahlinianum Dudman & A.J.Richards
- Taraxacum sahlinii Rail.
- Taraxacum sajanense Krasnikov
- Taraxacum salonikiense Sonck
- Taraxacum salsitatis Kirschner, Štěpánek & Yıld.
- Taraxacum salsum Kirschner & Štěpánek
- Taraxacum salutator Štěpánek & Kirschner
- Taraxacum samicum Sonck & H.Øllg.
- Taraxacum samuelssonii Dahlst. ex Soest
- Taraxacum sandomiriense Wolanin
- Taraxacum sangilense Krasnob. & Khanm.
- Taraxacum sanguineum Markl.
- Taraxacum sanguinicolor Saarsoo
- Taraxacum santandricum Soest
- Taraxacum saphycraspedum Saarsoo & G.E.Haglund
- Taraxacum saposhnikovii Schischk.
- Taraxacum sarcidanum Arrigoni
- Taraxacum sarcophyllum Dahlst.
- Taraxacum sardomontanum Arrigoni
- Taraxacum sasaense Soest
- Taraxacum saturatum Rail.
- Taraxacum saxenii Markl.
- Taraxacum saxonicum Uhlemann
- Taraxacum scalare H.Øllg. & J.Räsänen
- Taraxacum scalariferum Kirschner & Štěpánek
- Taraxacum scalenum M.P.Christ.
- Taraxacum scalifolium Hagend., Oosterv. & Zevenb.
- Taraxacum scaliforme W.Koch ex Soest
- Taraxacum scariosum (Tausch) Kirschner & Štěpánek
- Taraxacum scaturiginosum G.E.Haglund
- Taraxacum schelkovnikovii Schischk.
- Taraxacum schischkinii Korol.
- Taraxacum schlobarum R.Doll
- Taraxacum schmidianum Sahlin
- Taraxacum schroeterianum Hand.-Mazz.
- Taraxacum schugnanicum Schischk.
- Taraxacum scintillatum Rail.
- Taraxacum scololobum G.E.Haglund
- Taraxacum scolopendriforme R.Doll
- Taraxacum scolopendrinum Heldr. ex Dahlst.
- Taraxacum scopulorum (A.Gray) Rydb.
- Taraxacum scoticum A.J.Richards
- Taraxacum scotiniforme Dahlst. ex G.E.Haglund
- Taraxacum scotinum Dahlst.
- Taraxacum scotocranum G.E.Haglund
- Taraxacum scotodes Dahlst.
- Taraxacum scotolepidiforme M.P.Christ.
- Taraxacum scotolepis Dahlst.
- Taraxacum scotophyllum Saarsoo
- Taraxacum sect. Taraxacum F.H.Wigg.
- Taraxacum sectum G.Wendt & H.Øllg.
- Taraxacum sedulum Kirschner & Štěpánek
- Taraxacum selanderi G.E.Haglund
- Taraxacum selengensis Tzvelev
- Taraxacum selenodon M.P.Christ.
- Taraxacum selenoides Sahlin
- Taraxacum selenolobum M.P.Christ.
- Taraxacum sellandii Dahlst.
- Taraxacum semicurvatum H.Øllg.
- Taraxacum semiglobosum H.Lindb.
- Taraxacum semilunare Saarsoo
- Taraxacum semireductum Rail.
- Taraxacum semisagittatum Rail.
- Taraxacum semitubulosum Jurtzev
- Taraxacum semiundulatum Rail.
- Taraxacum senile Soest
- Taraxacum senjavinensis Jurtzev & Tzvelev
- Taraxacum septentrionale Dahlst.
- Taraxacum seravschanicum Schischk.
- Taraxacum serenum Štěpánek & Kirschner
- Taraxacum serotinum (Waldst. & Kit.) Poir.
- Taraxacum serpenticola A.J.Richards
- Taraxacum serpentinum Soest
- Taraxacum serratidentatum G.E.Haglund & Rail.
- Taraxacum serratifrons Florstr.
- Taraxacum serrulatum Rail.
- Taraxacum sertatum Kirschner, H.Øllg. & Štěpánek
- Taraxacum severum M.P.Christ.
- Taraxacum sherriffii Soest
- Taraxacum shetlandicum Dahlst.
- Taraxacum shikotanense Kitam.
- Taraxacum shirakium R.Doll
- Taraxacum shqipericum Sonck
- Taraxacum shumushuense Kitam.
- Taraxacum sibiricum Dahlst.
- Taraxacum siculum Soest
- Taraxacum sieheaniforme R.Doll
- Taraxacum sieheanum Soest
- Taraxacum sigillatum Rail.
- Taraxacum sigmoideum M.P.Christ.
- Taraxacum sikkimense Hand.-Mazz.
- Taraxacum silvicola Soest
- Taraxacum silvrettense Soest
- Taraxacum simile Raunk.
- Taraxacum simplex Björk
- Taraxacum simplicifolium G.E.Haglund
- Taraxacum simpliciusculum Soest
- Taraxacum simulans Kirschner & Štěpánek
- Taraxacum simulum Brenner
- Taraxacum sinensiforme Kirschner & Štěpánek
- Taraxacum singulare Brenner
- Taraxacum sinicum Kitag.
- Taraxacum sinotianschanicum Tzvelev
- Taraxacum sintenisii Dahlst.
- Taraxacum sinuatum Dahlst.
- Taraxacum sinulosum Rail.
- Taraxacum sinus-avis J.Räsänen
- Taraxacum siphonanthum X.D.Sun, X.J.Ge, Kirschner & Štěpánek
- Taraxacum siticulosum Štěpánek & Kirschner
- Taraxacum sitnjakovense R.Doll
- Taraxacum skalinskanum Małecka & Soest
- Taraxacum skalnatense R.Doll
- Taraxacum skanderbegii Sonck
- Taraxacum slovacum Klášt.
- Taraxacum smirnovii M.S.Ivanova
- Taraxacum soczavae Tzvelev
- Taraxacum solenanthinum Sahlin
- Taraxacum solidum Rail.
- Taraxacum solitarium Kirschner & Štěpánek
- Taraxacum sonchoides (D.Don) Sch.Bip.
- Taraxacum sonckii G.E.Haglund ex Sahlin
- Taraxacum songoricum Schischk.
- Taraxacum sophiae Kirschner & Štěpánek
- Taraxacum sordidepapposum Soest
- Taraxacum sordidulum Sonck
- Taraxacum sordidum Kirschner & Štěpánek
- Taraxacum spadiceum Kirschner & Štěpánek
- Taraxacum sparsidens G.E.Haglund ex Soest
- Taraxacum sparsum Štěpánek, Zámečník & Kirschner
- Taraxacum speciosiflorum M.P.Christ.
- Taraxacum speciosum Raunk.
- Taraxacum spectabile Dahlst.
- Taraxacum spetanum Štěpánek & Kirschner
- Taraxacum sphaeroidale H.Øllg.
- Taraxacum sphaeroides Dahlst.
- Taraxacum sphenolobum G.E.Haglund
- Taraxacum spiculatum M.P.Christ.
- Taraxacum spiculiforme M.P.Christ.
- Taraxacum spiculigerum Rail.
- Taraxacum spilophylloides Dahlst.
- Taraxacum spilophyllum Dahlst.
- Taraxacum spilosum Sonck
- Taraxacum spissum H.Øllg. & J.Räsänen
- Taraxacum spiticum Soest
- Taraxacum splendens Štěpánek & Kirschner
- Taraxacum splendidum G.E.Haglund
- Taraxacum spuriosulum H.Øllg.
- Taraxacum squamulosum Soest
- Taraxacum squarrosiceps Soest
- Taraxacum squarrosum Dahlst.
- Taraxacum staintonii Soest
- Taraxacum stanjukoviczii Schischk.
- Taraxacum starmuehleri Uhlemann
- Taraxacum staticifolium Soest
- Taraxacum staturale Rail.
- Taraxacum steenhoffianum Dahlst.
- Taraxacum stellare Markl.
- Taraxacum stenacrum Dahlst.
- Taraxacum stenanthum G.E.Haglund
- Taraxacum stenocephalum Boiss. & Kotschy
- Taraxacum stenoceras Dahlst.
- Taraxacum stenoglossum Brenner
- Taraxacum stenolepium Hand.-Mazz.
- Taraxacum stenophyllum Markl.
- Taraxacum stenoschistoides Hagend., Soest & Zevenb.
- Taraxacum stenoschistum Dahlst.
- Taraxacum stenospermum Sennen
- Taraxacum stenotegulatum Kirschner & Štěpánek
- Taraxacum stepanovae Vorosch.
- Taraxacum stephanocephalum Soest
- Taraxacum stereodes Ekman ex G.E.Haglund
- Taraxacum stereodiforme Soest
- Taraxacum sterneri G.E.Haglund
- Taraxacum stevenii (Spreng.) DC.
- Taraxacum steveniiforme R.Doll
- Taraxacum stewartii Soest
- Taraxacum stictophyllum Dahlst.
- Taraxacum strelitziense R.Doll
- Taraxacum striatifolium Štěpánek & Kirschner
- Taraxacum strictilobum Soest
- Taraxacum strictum Kirschner & Štěpánek
- Taraxacum strizhoviae Vainberg
- Taraxacum strobilocephalum Kovalevsk.
- Taraxacum stupendum Kirschner & Štěpánek
- Taraxacum stylosum Soest
- Taraxacum suasorium Kirschner & Štěpánek
- Taraxacum suave Kirschner & Štěpánek
- Taraxacum suavissimum Kirschner & Štěpánek
- Taraxacum subalatum H.Lindb.
- Taraxacum subalpinum Hudziok
- Taraxacum subalternilobum A.P.Khokhr.
- Taraxacum subaragonicum Sahlin
- Taraxacum subargutum Soest
- Taraxacum subarmatum Hagend., Soest & Zevenb.
- Taraxacum subatroplumbeum G.E.Haglund
- Taraxacum subaurosulum M.P.Christ.
- Taraxacum subborgvallii Uhlemann, Štěpánek & Kirschner
- Taraxacum subbracteatum A.J.Richards
- Taraxacum subbrevisectum Saarsoo
- Taraxacum subcalanthodium Kirschner & Štěpánek
- Taraxacum subcanescens Markl. ex Puol.
- Taraxacum subcollinum Kirschner & Štěpánek
- Taraxacum subcompactum Kirschner & Štěpánek
- Taraxacum subcontristans Kirschner & Štěpánek
- Taraxacum subcordatum Rail.
- Taraxacum subcoronatum Tzvelev
- Taraxacum subcrispum M.P.Christ.
- Taraxacum subdahlstedtii M.P.Christ.
- Taraxacum subdissimile Dahlst.
- Taraxacum subditivum Hagend., Soest & Zevenb.
- Taraxacum subdolum Kirschner & Štěpánek
- Taraxacum subeburneum Rail.
- Taraxacum subecorniculatum Gilli
- Taraxacum subekmanii Rail.
- Taraxacum subelatum G.E.Haglund ex Soest
- Taraxacum subericinum Hagend., Soest & Zevenb.
- Taraxacum suberiopodum Soest
- Taraxacum subestriatum M.P.Christ.
- Taraxacum subeximium M.P.Christ.
- Taraxacum subexpallidum Dahlst.
- Taraxacum subgentile Rail.
- Taraxacum subgentiliforme G.E.Haglund ex Soest
- Taraxacum subglaciale Schischk.
- Taraxacum subglaucescens Markl.
- Taraxacum subglebulosum Rail.
- Taraxacum subgrandidens G.E.Haglund
- Taraxacum subguttulosum Rail.
- Taraxacum subhamatum M.P.Christ.
- Taraxacum subhirtellum Dahlst. ex G.E.Haglund
- Taraxacum subhoplites M.P.Christ.
- Taraxacum subhuelphersianum M.P.Christ.
- Taraxacum subintegrum Dahlst.
- Taraxacum subinvestiens J.Räsänen
- Taraxacum subjurassicum Soest
- Taraxacum sublaciniosum Dahlst. & H.Lindb.
- Taraxacum sublaeticolor Dahlst.
- Taraxacum subleucopodum M.P.Christ.
- Taraxacum sublilacinum Kirschner & Štěpánek
- Taraxacum sublime Sonck
- Taraxacum sublimiforme Sonck
- Taraxacum sublongisquameum M.P.Christ.
- Taraxacum submacilentum Tzvelev
- Taraxacum submaculosum Markl.
- Taraxacum submicrocranum Sonck
- Taraxacum submolle A.J.Richards
- Taraxacum submosciense Dahlst.
- Taraxacum submucronatum Dahlst.
- Taraxacum submuticum G.E.Haglund
- Taraxacum subnaevosum A.J.Richards
- Taraxacum subnefrens M.P.Christ.
- Taraxacum subolivaceum Sonck
- Taraxacum subopacum Dahlst.
- Taraxacum subpallidissimum Soest
- Taraxacum subpardinum M.P.Christ.
- Taraxacum subpatens G.E.Haglund ex Soest
- Taraxacum subpellucidum Rail.
- Taraxacum subpenicilliforme H.Lindb. ex Dahlst.
- Taraxacum subpolonicum Kirschner & Štěpánek
- Taraxacum subpraticola G.E.Haglund
- Taraxacum subreduncum M.P.Christ.
- Taraxacum subrubescens G.E.Haglund
- Taraxacum subsaeviforme Rail.
- Taraxacum subsagittipatens Dahlst.
- Taraxacum subsaxenii Sahlin
- Taraxacum subscolopendricum M.P.Christ.
- Taraxacum subserratifrons Saarsoo
- Taraxacum subsiphonium Kirschner & Štěpánek
- Taraxacum subspilophyllum G.E.Haglund
- Taraxacum subsucculentum Kirschner & Štěpánek
- Taraxacum subtenuiforme M.P.Christ.
- Taraxacum subtile Markl.
- Taraxacum subudum Kirschner & Štěpánek
- Taraxacum subulatidens G.E.Haglund
- Taraxacum subulatum Markl.
- Taraxacum subulicuspis G.E.Haglund
- Taraxacum subulisquameum Brenner
- Taraxacum subundulatum Dahlst.
- Taraxacum subvestrobottnicum G.E.Haglund
- Taraxacum subvulpinum Kirschner & Štěpánek
- Taraxacum subxanthostigma M.P.Christ. ex H.Øllg.
- Taraxacum succedens Kirschner & Štěpánek
- Taraxacum suecicum G.E.Haglund
- Taraxacum suffocatum Kirschner & Štěpánek
- Taraxacum sugawarae H.Koidz.
- Taraxacum sulger-buelii Soest
- Taraxacum sulitelmae G.E.Haglund
- Taraxacum sumneviczii Schischk.
- Taraxacum sundbergii Dahlst.
- Taraxacum superbum Markl.
- Taraxacum suspectum Kirschner & Štěpánek
- Taraxacum svetlanae Czerep.
- Taraxacum symphorilobum G.E.Haglund
- Taraxacum syriacum Boiss.
- Taraxacum syrtorum Dshan.
- Taraxacum szovitsii Soest

== T ==
- Taraxacum taeniatum G.E.Haglund
- Taraxacum taeniformatum Rail.
- Taraxacum taimyrense Tzvelev
- Taraxacum tamarae Kharkev. & Tzvelev
- Taraxacum tamesense A.J.Richards
- Taraxacum tanylepis Dahlst.
- Taraxacum tanyodon Rail.
- Taraxacum tanyolobum Dahlst.
- Taraxacum tanyphyllum Dahlst.
- Taraxacum tarraconense Sennen
- Taraxacum tatewakii Kitam.
- Taraxacum tatrense R.Doll
- Taraxacum taxkorganicum Z.X.An ex D.T.Zhai
- Taraxacum telmatophilum Kirschner & Štěpánek
- Taraxacum tenebricans (Dahlst.) H.Lindb.
- Taraxacum tenebristylum Soest
- Taraxacum tenellisquameum Markl.
- Taraxacum tenue G.E.Haglund
- Taraxacum tenuiceps Soest
- Taraxacum tenuiculum Kirschner & Štěpánek
- Taraxacum tenuifolium (Hoppe & Hornsch.) W.D.J.Koch
- Taraxacum tenuiforme G.E.Haglund
- Taraxacum tenuilinguatum Rail.
- Taraxacum tenuilobum (Dahlst.) Dahlst.
- Taraxacum tenuipetiolatum Rail.
- Taraxacum tenuiprotractum Kirschner & Štěpánek
- Taraxacum tenuisectum Sommier & Levier
- Taraxacum tenuisquameum Dahlst. ex G.E.Haglund
- Taraxacum tephroleucum Štěpánek & Kirschner
- Taraxacum terenodes Sonck
- Taraxacum teres Sonck
- Taraxacum terrestre Štěpánek & Kirschner
- Taraxacum tetricum Štěpánek & Kirschner
- Taraxacum teuvaeense Rail.
- Taraxacum texelense Hagend., Soest & Zevenb.
- Taraxacum theodori Lundev. & H.Øllg.
- Taraxacum thessalicum Soest
- Taraxacum thorvaldii H.Øllg.
- Taraxacum thracicum Soest
- Taraxacum tianschanicum Pavlov
- Taraxacum tibetanum Hand.-Mazz.
- Taraxacum tilesianum Kirschner & Štěpánek
- Taraxacum tinctum Markl. ex H.Lindb.
- Taraxacum tirichense Soest
- Taraxacum tiroliense Dahlst.
- Taraxacum toletanum Sennen
- Taraxacum tolmaczevii Jurtzev
- Taraxacum tolonasum Sonck
- Taraxacum tonsum Kirschner & Štěpánek
- Taraxacum tornense T.C.E.Fr.
- Taraxacum tortilobiforme Soest
- Taraxacum tortilobum Florstr.
- Taraxacum tortuosum Hagend., Soest & Zevenb.
- Taraxacum torvum G.E.Haglund
- Taraxacum tourmalettense Soest
- Taraxacum transjordanicum Soest
- Taraxacum trepidans Kirschner & Štěpánek
- Taraxacum triangulare H.Lindb.
- Taraxacum triangularidentatum Soest
- Taraxacum tricolor Soest
- Taraxacum tricuspidatum Soest
- Taraxacum triforme Soest
- Taraxacum trigonense Sonck
- Taraxacum trigonum M.P.Christ.
- Taraxacum trilobatum Palmgr.
- Taraxacum trilobifolium Hudziok
- Taraxacum triste M.P.Christ.
- Taraxacum tristiceps Soest
- Taraxacum tropaeatum Rail.
- Taraxacum trottii Soest
- Taraxacum truculentum Rail.
- Taraxacum tschuktschorum (Tzvelev) Jurtzev & Tzvelev
- Taraxacum tubulosum Kirschner & Štěpánek
- Taraxacum tujuksuense Orazova
- Taraxacum tumentilobum Markl. ex Puol.
- Taraxacum turbidum Sonck
- Taraxacum turbiniceps G.E.Haglund
- Taraxacum turcicum Soest
- Taraxacum turcomanicum Schischk.
- Taraxacum turfosiforme Kirschner & Štěpánek
- Taraxacum turfosum (Sch.Bip.) Soest
- Taraxacum turgaicum Schischk.
- Taraxacum turgidum Meierott & H.Øllg.
- Taraxacum turritum Kirschner & Štěpánek
- Taraxacum tuvense Krasnob. & Krasnikov
- Taraxacum tuzgoluense Yıld. & Doğru-Koca
- Taraxacum tzvelevii Schischk.

== U ==
- Taraxacum uberilobum H.Lindb.
- Taraxacum uberrimum Kirschner & Štěpánek
- Taraxacum udum Jord.
- Taraxacum uliginosum Kirschner & Štěpánek
- Taraxacum ulogonioides Rail.
- Taraxacum ulophyllum M.P.Christ.
- Taraxacum umbonulatum Rail.
- Taraxacum umbrosum Sonck, Kirschner & Štěpánek
- Taraxacum uncatilobum M.P.Christ.
- Taraxacum uncatum G.E.Haglund
- Taraxacum uncidentatum Rail.
- Taraxacum unciferum Markl. ex Rail.
- Taraxacum uncosum G.E.Haglund
- Taraxacum undulatiflorum M.P.Christ.
- Taraxacum undulatiforme Dahlst.
- Taraxacum undulatum H.Lindb. & Marklund
- Taraxacum unguiferum Markl. ex Back
- Taraxacum unguifrons Hagend., Soest & Zevenb.
- Taraxacum unguilobifrons A.J.Richards
- Taraxacum unguilobum Dahlst.
- Taraxacum ungulatum (Brenner) Brenner
- Taraxacum unicoloratum A.J.Richards
- Taraxacum uniforme H.Øllg.
- Taraxacum urbicola Kirschner, Štěpánek & Trávn.
- Taraxacum uschakovii Jurtzev
- Taraxacum userinum R.Doll
- Taraxacum ussuriense Kom.
- Taraxacum ustkanense M.S.Ivanova
- Taraxacum uvidum Kirschner & Štěpánek
- Taraxacum uzunoglui Soest

== V ==
- Taraxacum vaccarii Soest
- Taraxacum vacillans G.E.Haglund
- Taraxacum vadosum Kirschner & Štěpánek
- Taraxacum vagum Soest
- Taraxacum vaitolahtense G.E.Haglund
- Taraxacum valdedentatum Dahlst.
- Taraxacum valens Markl.
- Taraxacum valesiacum Soest
- Taraxacum validum Štěpánek & Kirschner
- Taraxacum vallis-nibulae Arrigoni
- Taraxacum vanum H.Øllg.
- Taraxacum varians Kirschner & Štěpánek
- Taraxacum variegatum Kitag.
- Taraxacum varioviolaceum A.P.Khokhr.
- Taraxacum varsobicum Schischk.
- Taraxacum vassilczenkoi Schischk.
- Taraxacum vastisectiforme Hagend., Soest & Zevenb.
- Taraxacum vastisectum Markl. ex Puol.
- Taraxacum vauclusense Soest
- Taraxacum veglianum Uhlemann
- Taraxacum velebiticum Štěpánek & Kirschner
- Taraxacum vendibile Kirschner & Štěpánek
- Taraxacum venticola A.J.Richards
- Taraxacum ventorum G.E.Haglund
- Taraxacum venustius Kirschner & Štěpánek
- Taraxacum venustum Dahlst.
- Taraxacum vepallidum Kirschner & Štěpánek
- Taraxacum verecundum G.E.Haglund
- Taraxacum vernelense Soest
- Taraxacum versaillense Soest
- Taraxacum versilianum Arrigoni
- Taraxacum verticosum Rail.
- Taraxacum verutigerum Rail.
- Taraxacum vestitum Vorosch.
- Taraxacum vestmannicum M.P.Christ.
- Taraxacum vestrobottnicum Dahlst.
- Taraxacum vestrogothicum Dahlst.
- Taraxacum vetteri Soest
- Taraxacum vexatum Sonck
- Taraxacum vidlense R.Doll
- Taraxacum vigens Kirschner & Štěpánek
- Taraxacum vile Štěpánek & Kirschner
- Taraxacum vindobonense Soest
- Taraxacum vinosicoloratum Rail.
- Taraxacum vinosum Soest
- Taraxacum violaceifrons Trávn.
- Taraxacum violaceinervosum Rail.
- Taraxacum violaceipetiolatum Rail.
- Taraxacum violaceomaculatum Soest
- Taraxacum violaceum R.Doll
- Taraxacum violascens Dahlst.
- Taraxacum virellum G.E.Haglund ex Sahlin
- Taraxacum virgineum Kirschner, Štěpánek & Klimeš
- Taraxacum viridans G.E.Haglund ex H.Øllg.
- Taraxacum viridescens G.E.Haglund ex Soest
- Taraxacum vitalii Orazovot
- Taraxacum vitellicolor Štěpánek & Kirschner
- Taraxacum vitellinum Dahlst.
- Taraxacum volitans J.Räsänen
- Taraxacum voronovii Schischk.
- Taraxacum vulcanorum H.Koidz.
- Taraxacum vulgum R.Doll
- Taraxacum vulpinum Soest

== W ==
- Taraxacum wallichii DC.
- Taraxacum wallonicum Soest
- Taraxacum walo-kochii Soest
- Taraxacum waltheri R.Doll
- Taraxacum wardenium R.Doll
- Taraxacum warenum R.Doll
- Taraxacum webbii A.J.Richards
- Taraxacum wendelboanum Soest
- Taraxacum wendtii H.Øllg.
- Taraxacum wessbergii H.Øllg.
- Taraxacum westmanii Rail.
- Taraxacum wibergense H.Øllg.
- Taraxacum wiinstedtii H.Øllg.
- Taraxacum wijtmaniae Sterk & Fengler
- Taraxacum woroschilovii Gubanov
- Taraxacum wrangelicum Tzvelev
- Taraxacum wuqiaense L.Q.Zhao & Aogan

== X ==
- Taraxacum xanthiense Soest
- Taraxacum xantholigulatum Sonck
- Taraxacum xanthophyllum G.E.Haglund
- Taraxacum xanthostigma H.Lindb.
- Taraxacum xerophilum Markl. ex H.Lindb.
- Taraxacum xinyuanicum D.T.Zhai & C.H.An
- Taraxacum xiphoideum G.E.Haglund

== Y ==
- Taraxacum yuparense H.Koidz.
- Taraxacum yvelinense Soest

== Z ==
- Taraxacum zagorae Sonck
- Taraxacum zajacii J.Marciniuk & P.Marciniuk
- Taraxacum zamarrudiae Abedin
- Taraxacum zanskarense Klimeš ex Kirschner & Štěpánek
- Taraxacum zealandicum Dahlst.
- Taraxacum zelotes Sahlin
- Taraxacum zermattense Dahlst.
- Taraxacum zevenbergenii Soest
- Taraxacum zhukovae Tzvelev
- Taraxacum zineralum R.Doll
- Taraxacum ziwaschum R.Doll
