= Taraxacum lissocarpum =

Scientific classification
- Kingdom: Plantae
- Clade: Tracheophytes
- Clade: Angiosperms
- Clade: Eudicots
- Clade: Asterids
- Order: Asterales
- Family: Asteraceae
- Genus: Taraxacum
- Species: T. lissocarpum

Binomial name
- Taraxacum lissocarpum (Dahlst.) Dahlst.

Species of flowering plant

Taraxacum lissocarpum is a species of flowering plant belonging to the family Asteraceae.
