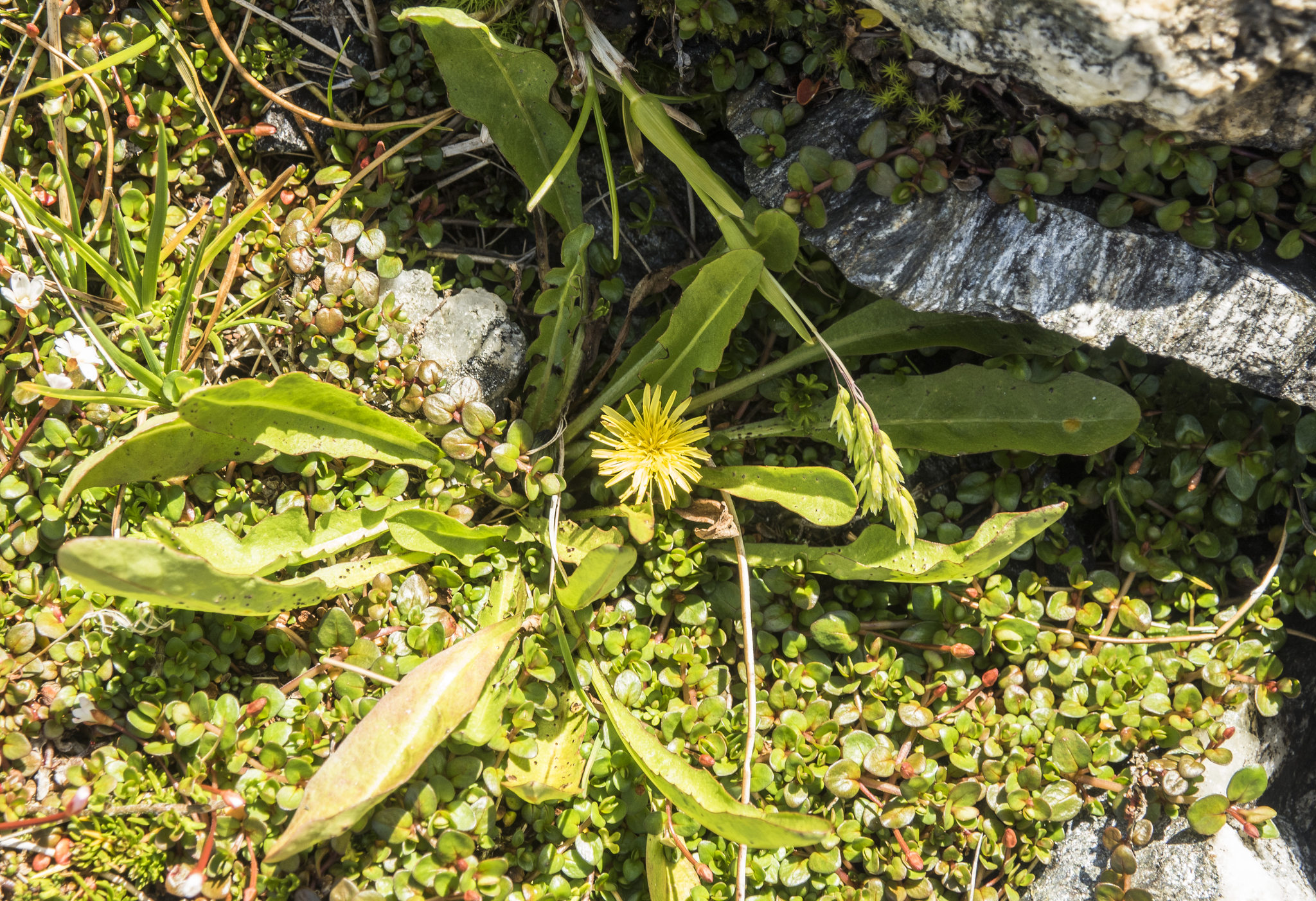

Scientific classification
- Kingdom: Plantae
- Clade: Tracheophytes
- Clade: Angiosperms
- Clade: Eudicots
- Clade: Asterids
- Order: Asterales
- Family: Asteraceae
- Genus: Taraxacum
- Species: T. zealandicum

Binomial name
- Taraxacum zealandicum Dahlst.

= Taraxacum zealandicum =

Species of flowering plant

Taraxacum zealandicum, also known as the New Zealand dandelion and the native dandelion (in New Zealand), is a perennial species of dandelion. The species is endemic to New Zealand. It has linear to oblong, usually dentate basal leaves and a hollow stem that can grow up to thirty centimeters. The species also has ribbed clavate-fusiform achenes with a slender beak and white pappus. The flower was first described in 1907.
