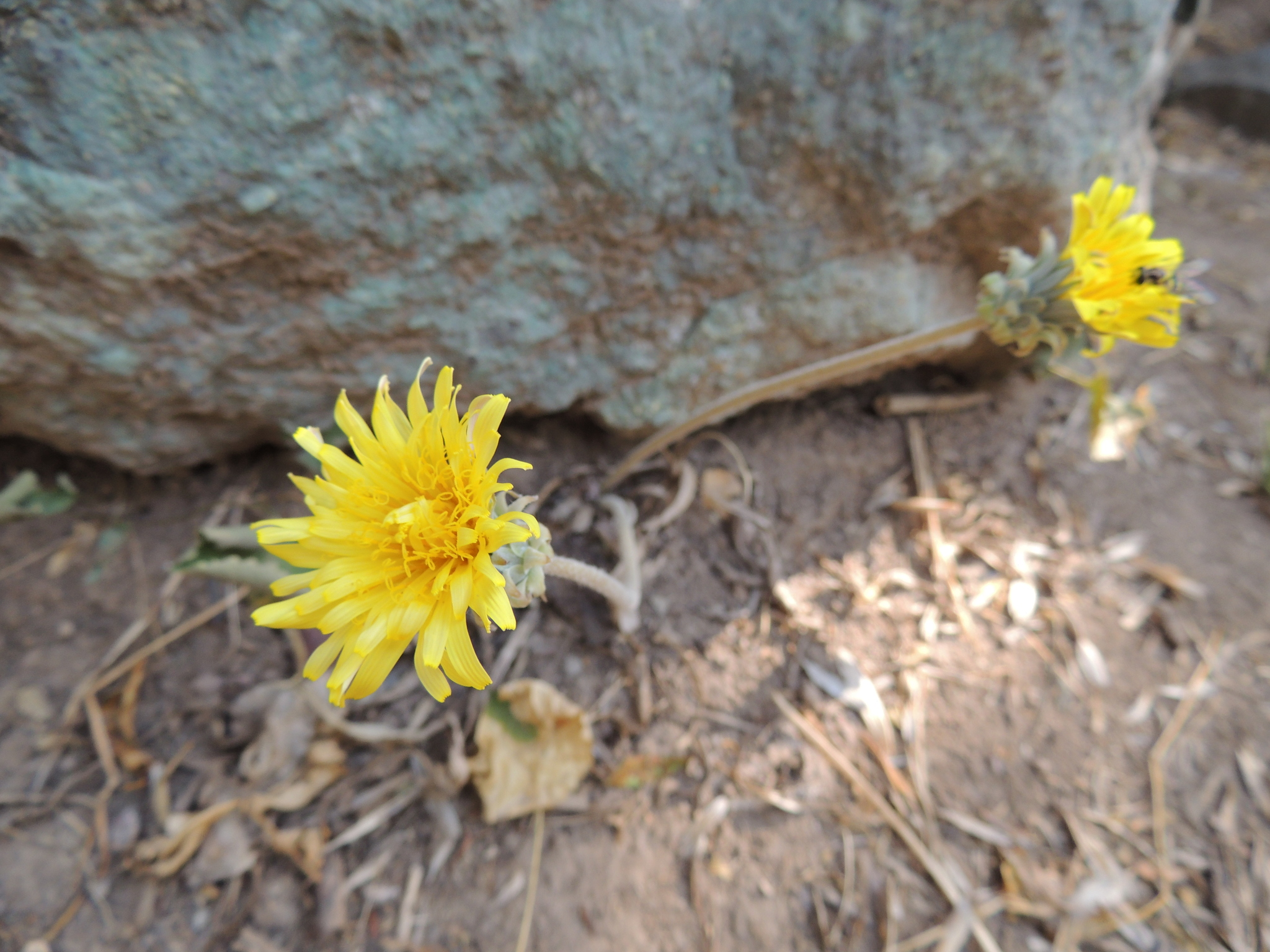

Scientific classification
- Kingdom: Plantae
- Clade: Tracheophytes
- Clade: Angiosperms
- Clade: Eudicots
- Clade: Asterids
- Order: Asterales
- Family: Asteraceae
- Genus: Taraxacum
- Species: T. turcomanicum

Binomial name
- Taraxacum turcomanicum Schischk.

= Taraxacum turcomanicum =

Species of flowering plant

Taraxacum turcomanicum is a perennial species of dandelion. The species is native to central Asia, occurring in Kazakhstan and Uzbekistan. It was first described in 1960. T. turcomanicum grows primarily in temperate areas. The flower is found most commonly in September.
