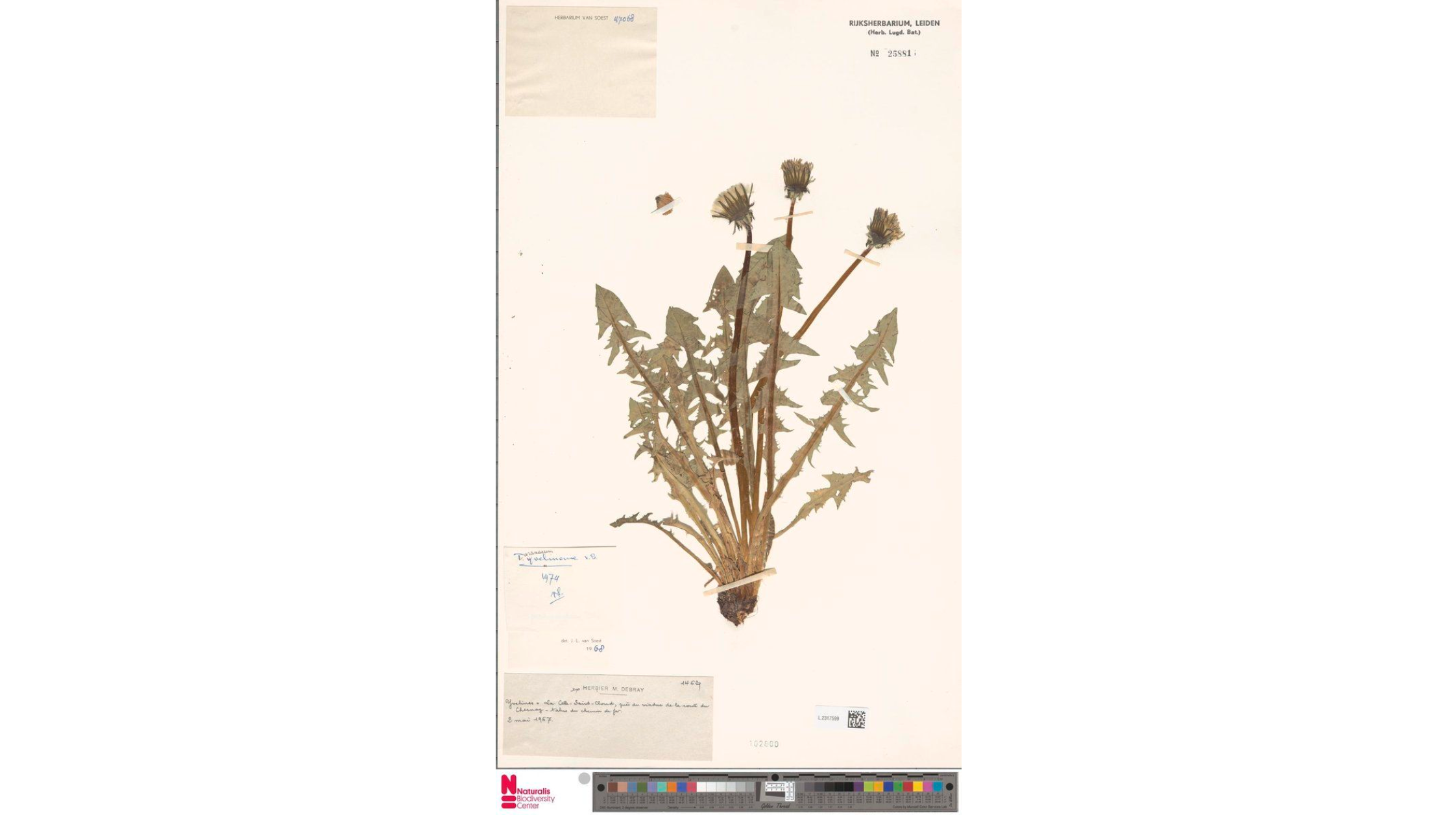

Scientific classification
- Kingdom: Plantae
- Clade: Embryophytes
- Clade: Tracheophytes
- Clade: Spermatophytes
- Clade: Angiosperms
- Clade: Eudicots
- Clade: Asterids
- Order: Asterales
- Family: Asteraceae
- Genus: Taraxacum
- Species: T. yvelinense

Binomial name
- Taraxacum yvelinense Soest

= Taraxacum yvelinense =

Species of flowering plant

Taraxacum yvelinense is a species of flowering plant in the family Asteraceae.

Taraxacum yvelinense is native to France. It is a perennial.

The species was named by Johannes Leendert van Soest in 1975.
