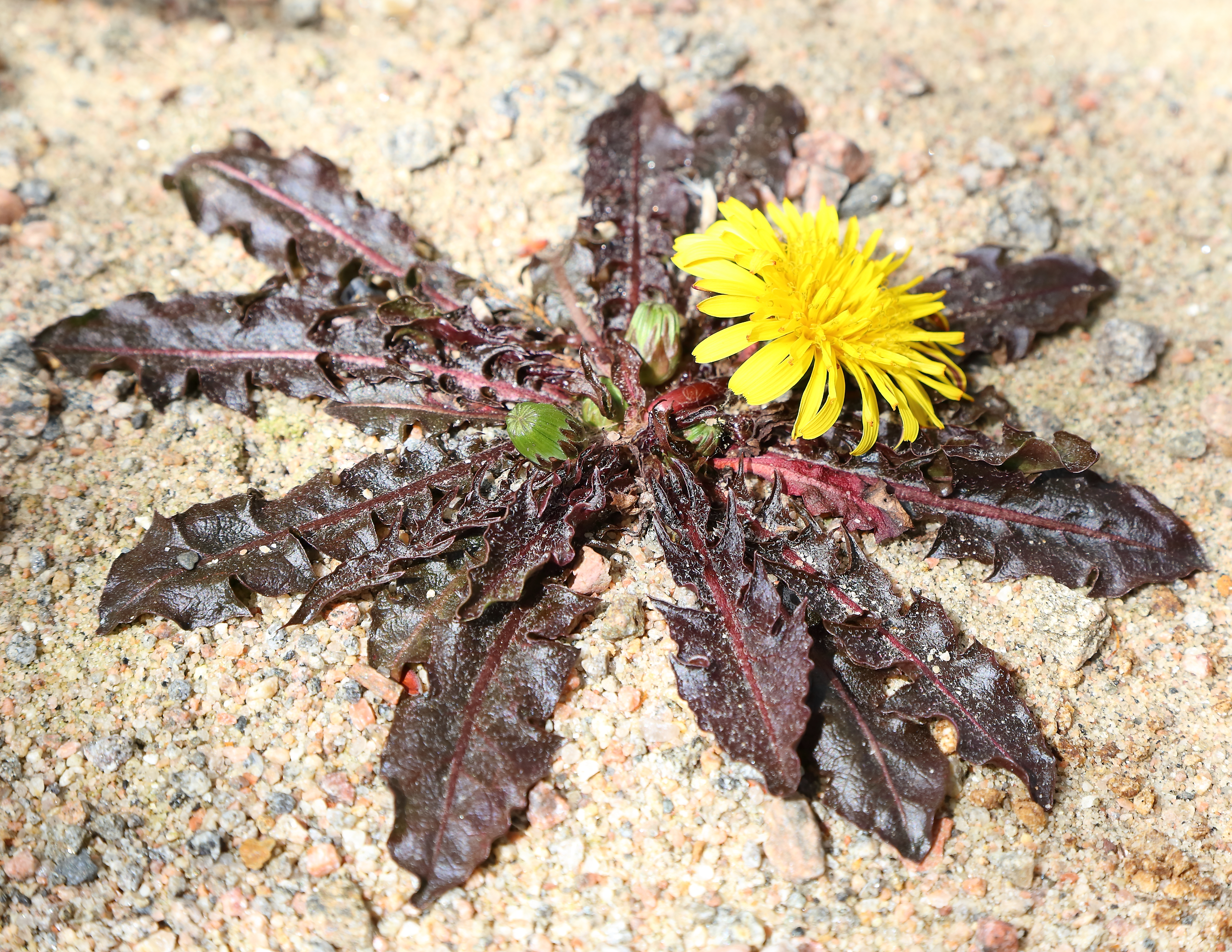

Scientific classification
- Kingdom: Plantae
- Clade: Embryophytes
- Clade: Tracheophytes
- Clade: Spermatophytes
- Clade: Angiosperms
- Clade: Eudicots
- Clade: Asterids
- Order: Asterales
- Family: Asteraceae
- Genus: Taraxacum
- Species: T. rubifolium

Binomial name
- Taraxacum rubifolium Rasmussen
- It was endemic to the Faroe Islands but it is extinct in the wild

= Taraxacum rubifolium =

Species of plant

Taraxacum rubifolium is a species of dandelion endemic to the Faroe Islands. It is believed to be extinct in the wild.

== Description ==
Taraxacum rubifolium is a terrestrial plant bearing brown to red leaves with unwinged petioles. The bright yellow capitulum is 45 mm wide. The stamens are sterile.

== Taxonomy ==
It was described by Rasmussen in 1952.

=== Etymology ===
The specific epithet rubifolium means with Rubus like leaves.

== Conservation ==
It is probably extinct in the wild, but it is still found in cultivation in botanic gardens and private collections. It was last seen in the wild in 1978 when construction work was carried out at the type locality.
