= Taraxacum clavatifrons =

Scientific classification
- Kingdom: Plantae
- Clade: Tracheophytes
- Clade: Angiosperms
- Clade: Eudicots
- Clade: Asterids
- Order: Asterales
- Family: Asteraceae
- Genus: Taraxacum
- Species: T. clavatifrons

Binomial name
- Taraxacum clavatifrons Sonck

Species of flowering plant

Taraxacum clavatifrons is a perennial species of dandelion. The species is native to France and grows primarily in temperate biomes. It was first formally described in 1998 by Carl Eric Sonck in Annales Botanici Fennici.
