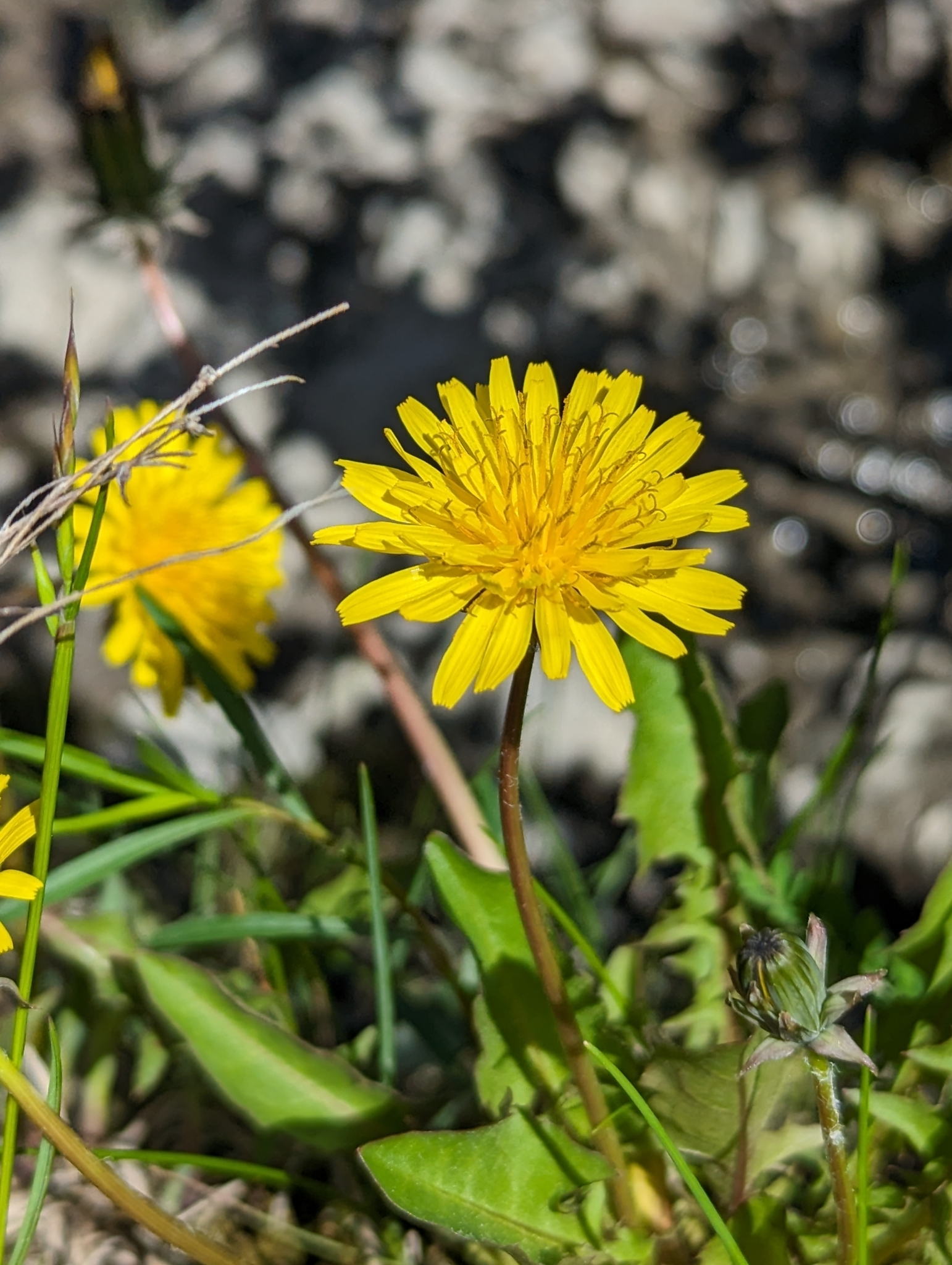

Scientific classification
- Kingdom: Plantae
- Clade: Tracheophytes
- Clade: Angiosperms
- Clade: Eudicots
- Clade: Asterids
- Order: Asterales
- Family: Asteraceae
- Genus: Taraxacum
- Species: T. latilobum

Binomial name
- Taraxacum latilobum (DC.) Britt

Synonyms
- Leontodon latilobus

= Taraxacum latilobum =

Species of flowering plant

Taraxacum latilobum, also known as the large-lobed dandelion, is a species of dandelion found in eastern North America native to Maine, Newfoundland, and Quebec. The roots and leaves were part of the traditional plant foods of Canadian indigenous peoples.

Along with the St. Lawrence dandelion (Taraxacum laurentianum), Taraxacum latilobum has been found in the Mingan Archipelago, a biodiversity hotspot in Quebec.
