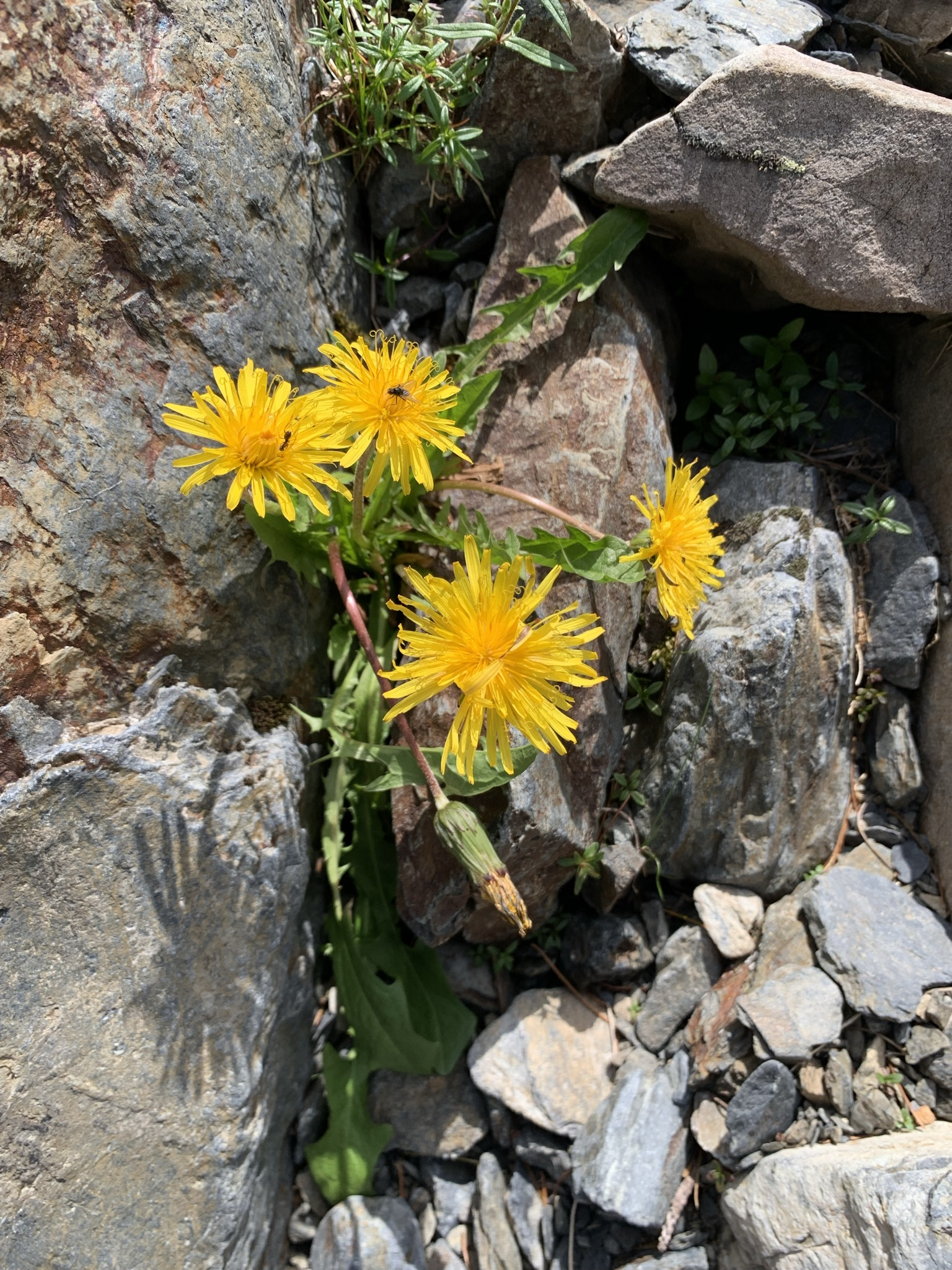

Scientific classification
- Kingdom: Plantae
- Clade: Tracheophytes
- Clade: Angiosperms
- Clade: Eudicots
- Clade: Asterids
- Order: Asterales
- Family: Asteraceae
- Genus: Taraxacum
- Species: T. brachyphyllum

Binomial name
- Taraxacum brachyphyllum H.Koidz.

Synonyms
- Taraxacum shinanense

= Taraxacum brachyphyllum =

Species of flowering plant

Taraxacum brachyphyllum is a perennial species of dandelion. The species is native to Sakhalin and Japan. T. brachyphyllum grows primarily in temperate areas. The flower is found most commonly between June and August. It was first described in 1933.
