= Taraxacum estrelense =

Scientific classification
- Kingdom: Plantae
- Clade: Tracheophytes
- Clade: Angiosperms
- Clade: Eudicots
- Clade: Asterids
- Order: Asterales
- Family: Asteraceae
- Genus: Taraxacum
- Species: T. estrelense

Binomial name
- Taraxacum estrelense A.Galán & Vicente Orell.
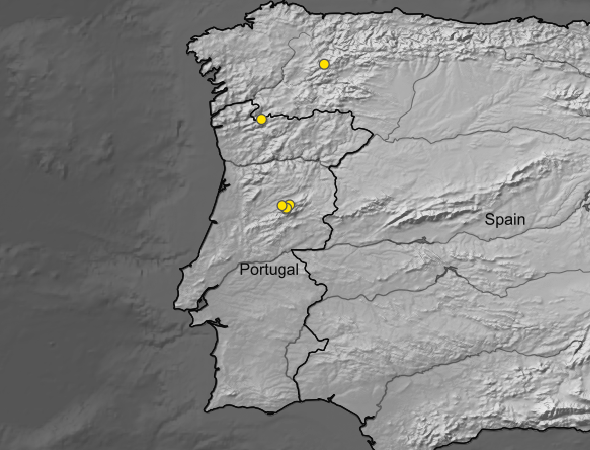
- Distribution of Taraxacum estrelense

Dandelion species

Taraxacum estrelense is an apomictic species of dandelion, known from the Serra da Estrela and Gerês mountain ranges in Portugal, and the Courel range in Spain. It belongs to sect. Celtica.

== Description ==
Taraxacum estrelense is a medium-sized dandelion up to 30 cm tall, larger than the related Taraxacum triforme and Taraxacum algarbiense from southern Portugal. It has purple-spotted leaves with highly recurved and toothed leaf lobes. Pollen is scarce and produced only by the external flowers of the capitulum. The external phyllaries of the capitula have an inconspicuous white border. Achenes are olive-green, occasionally pink-streaked, with a discoloured pappus.

Records of Taraxacum algarbiense from Serra da Estrela refer to this species.
