= Desert dandelion =

Desert dandelion is a common name for several plants and may refer to:

- Malacothrix, a genus of North American plants in the family Asteraceae
- Taraxacum desertorum, a species of dandelion native to the Caucasus

== See also ==
- Dandelion
