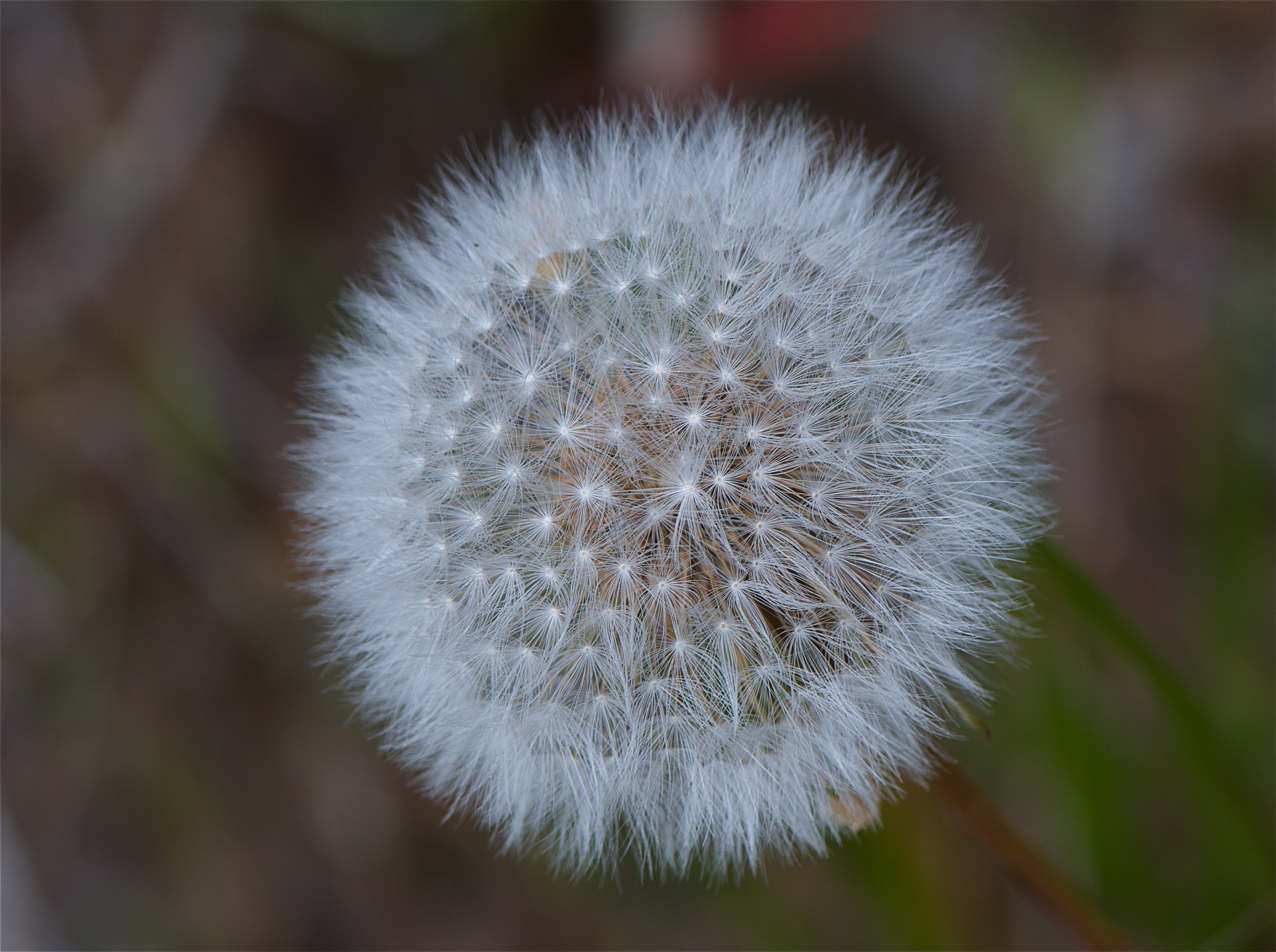

Scientific classification
- Kingdom: Plantae
- Clade: Tracheophytes
- Clade: Angiosperms
- Clade: Eudicots
- Clade: Asterids
- Order: Asterales
- Family: Asteraceae
- Genus: Taraxacum
- Species: T. erythrospermum

Binomial name
- Taraxacum erythrospermum Andrz. ex Besser

Synonyms
- Taraxacum laevigatum var. erythrospermum (Andrz. ex Besser) J.Weiss

= Taraxacum erythrospermum =

Red-seeded dandelion

Dandelion species similar to the common dandelion

Taraxacum erythrospermum, known by the common name red-seeded dandelion, is a species of dandelion introduced to much of North America, but most commonly found in the north. It is often considered as a variety of Taraxacum laevigatum (i.e., Taraxacum laevigatum var. erythrospermum). In many characteristics, it is similar to the common dandelion, Taraxacum officinale.

== Description ==
This species is very similar to, and often mistaken for, the common dandelion, Taraxacum officinale. It most readily differs by its reddish-brown seed bases, unlike the more olive colored seeds of T. officinale. The red-seeded dandelion can also be identified by its leaves, which have consistently triangular lobes throughout, whereas T. officinale tends to have erratic lobing with minimal or no triangular form. The leaves of T. erythrospermum thus bear a closer resemblance to the basal leaves of sow thistles (Sonchus oleraceus).

== Distribution ==
Species native to Europe, Northern Africa and Asia. Introduced to a sizeable portion of North America, but also to Southern America (Argentina), Iceland, Great Britain and the Korean Peninsula.
