= Taraxacum algarbiense =

Scientific classification
- Kingdom: Plantae
- Clade: Tracheophytes
- Clade: Angiosperms
- Clade: Eudicots
- Clade: Asterids
- Order: Asterales
- Family: Asteraceae
- Genus: Taraxacum
- Species: T. algarbiense

Binomial name
- Taraxacum algarbiense Soest

Dandelion species

Taraxacum algarbiense is a species of dandelion endemic to the Monchique range in Portugal. It belongs to sect. Celtica.

== Description ==
Taraxacum algarbiense is similar to Taraxacum triforme, and sometimes included in it, but it differs in the length of the terminal lobe of the leaves. In T. algarviense, this lobe is 1/3 or less of the total length of the leaf, while in T. triforme it amounts to 1/2 to 2/3 of the leaf. T. algarviense is also more glabrescent and has shorter scapes.

Records of Taraxacum algarbiense from Serra da Estrela refer to Taraxacum estrelense, a larger species.

== Etymology ==
It is named after the Algarve, the region of Portugal where it grows.
