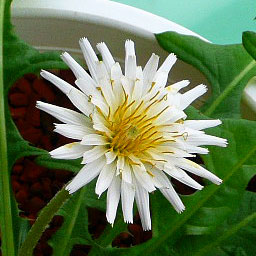
- White-flowered Japanese dandelion

Scientific classification
- Kingdom: Plantae
- Clade: Tracheophytes
- Clade: Angiosperms
- Clade: Eudicots
- Clade: Asterids
- Order: Asterales
- Family: Asteraceae
- Genus: Taraxacum
- Species: T. albidum

Binomial name
- Taraxacum albidum Dahlst.

= Taraxacum albidum =

Species of flowering plant

Taraxacum albidum is a species of dandelion that grows in eastern Eurasia. A member of the Asteraceae, it is a perennial herbaceous plant native to southern Japan.

== Description ==
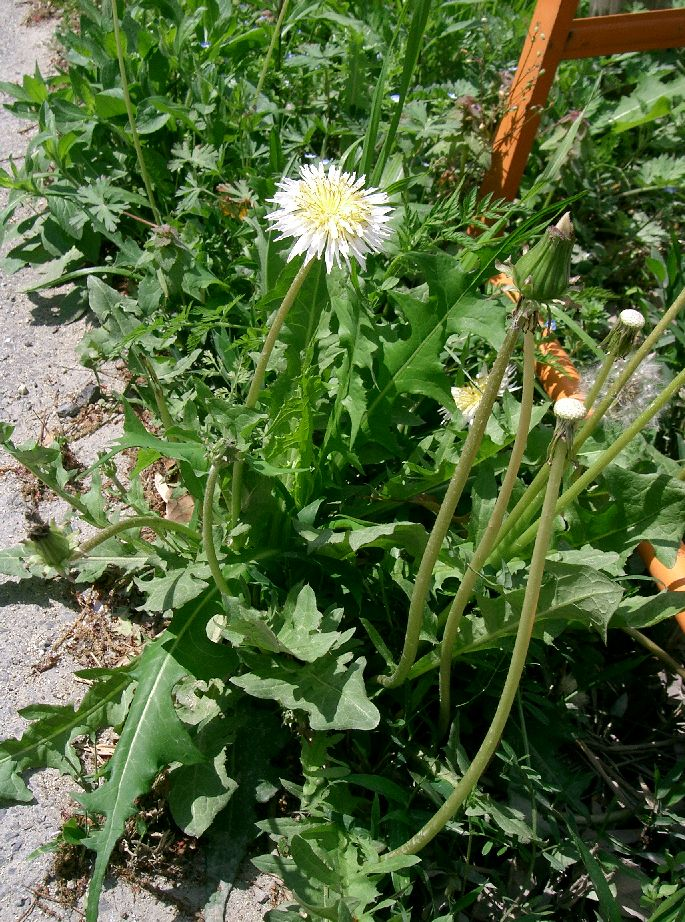
The flowers are held singly on smooth stems above the basal rosette of leaves

The deeply lobed leaves of this tap-rooted perennial plant form a basal rosette from which the long, slightly downy, unbranched hollow scapes (flower stalks) rise to around 40 cm (1 ft 4in). It blooms once a year, usually in spring (March to May) but sometimes in late autumn. Each scape bears a single flower head consisting of many small, white ray florets, opening from a rounded bud consisting of narrow green bracts.

After the flower closes, it later opens as the familiar spherical seedhead or "clock", as in other dandelions. The seedhead consists of many single-seeded fruits or achenes, each attached to a pappus of fine hairs that acts as a parachute to enable wind dispersal of the seeds, sometimes over long distances. The seeds remain dormant until autumn.

The leaves wither to avoid heat damage for several months of the summer. In autumn, new leaves emerge and continue photosynthesizing until the next summer.

It is pentaploid (having five sets of chromosomes) and produces seeds asexually, like many other Taraxacum species. Namely, most of the florets make seeds without pollination; however, a few of them require pollination. For this reason, it can be hybridized with other species.

== Taxonomy ==
It is sometimes mistaken for Taraxacum coreanum, but T. coreanum grows wild chiefly in the Korean Peninsula and some parts of China. Taraxacum albidum is a hybrid between T. coreanum and Taraxacum japonicum (Tatsuyoshi Morita, Moleculer phylodenetic analysis of polyoloid complex of East Asian Taraxacum [sic], 1996-1997).
