= California dandelion =

California dandelion may refer to:

- Taraxacum californicum, a small endangered flower of southern California
- Agoseris grandiflora, a large flower of western North America
