= Taraxacum suecicum =

Scientific classification
- Kingdom: Plantae
- Clade: Tracheophytes
- Clade: Angiosperms
- Clade: Eudicots
- Clade: Asterids
- Order: Asterales
- Family: Asteraceae
- Genus: Taraxacum
- Species: T. suecicum

Binomial name
- Taraxacum suecicum G.E.Haglund, 1952

Species of flowering plant

Taraxacum suecicum is a species of plants belonging to the family Asteraceae.

It is native to Northern Europe and Baltic states.
