= Taraxacum centrasiaticum =

Scientific classification
- Kingdom: Plantae
- Clade: Tracheophytes
- Clade: Angiosperms
- Clade: Eudicots
- Clade: Asterids
- Order: Asterales
- Family: Asteraceae
- Genus: Taraxacum
- Species: T. centrasiaticum

Binomial name
- Taraxacum centrasiaticum D.T.Zhai & C.H.An

Species of flowering plant

Taraxacum centrasiaticum is a rare and little-known species of dandelion known only from alpine meadows at an elevation of 3,400–3,500 m (11,200–11,500 ft) in the Xinjiang Uyghur Autonomous Region of western China.
