= Taraxacum farinosum =

Scientific classification
- Kingdom: Plantae
- Clade: Tracheophytes
- Clade: Angiosperms
- Clade: Eudicots
- Clade: Asterids
- Order: Asterales
- Family: Asteraceae
- Genus: Taraxacum
- Species: T. farinosum

Binomial name
- Taraxacum farinosum Hausskn. & Bornm. ex Hand.-Mazz.

Species of flowering plant

Taraxacum farinosum, common name in Turkish cırtlık, is a type of perennial dandelion that grows between 800 and 1200 m on salty soils in central Turkey. It is herbaceous halophyte plant up to 5–15 cm tall. Irano-Turanian Region or Iran-Turan Plant Geography Region element.
