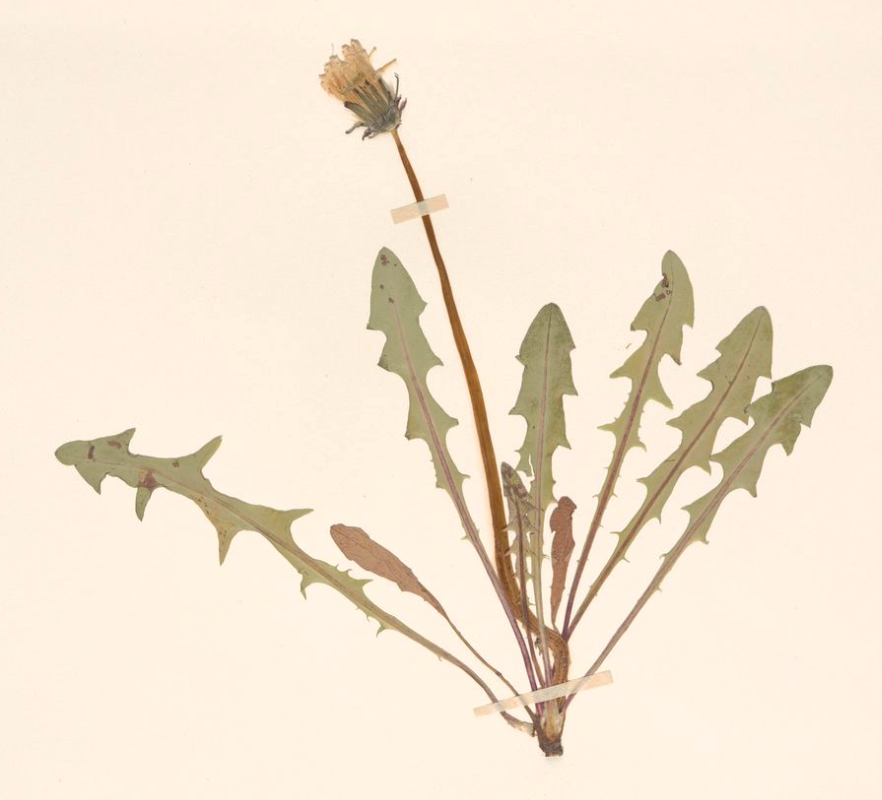

Scientific classification
- Kingdom: Plantae
- Clade: Tracheophytes
- Clade: Angiosperms
- Clade: Eudicots
- Clade: Asterids
- Order: Asterales
- Family: Asteraceae
- Genus: Taraxacum
- Species: T. polium

Binomial name
- Taraxacum polium Dahlst.

= Taraxacum polium =

Species of flowering plant

Taraxacum polium, commonly called the Gotland dandelion is a perennial species of dandelion in the family Asteraceae, native to southeastern Sweden. It has not been sighted since 1964 and is considered globally extinct since 2020.

It was primarily found on the island of Gotland, where it inhabited moist grasslands, meadows, woodland margins, and roadsides. The species was first described in 1910 by Swedish botanist Gustav Adolf Hugo Dahlstedt in Arkiv för Botanik, based on material collected from a railway embankment in Endre parish. Although morphologically similar to related species such as Taraxacum spectabile and T. nordstedtii, T. polium is distinguished by its bluish-grey, densely hairy foliage; narrow, reflexed leaf lobes; small, convex capitula; and short, broadly ovate involucral bracts. It has also been introduced to British Columbia, Canada, where it occurs as a weed in urban and roadside habitats.

== Description ==
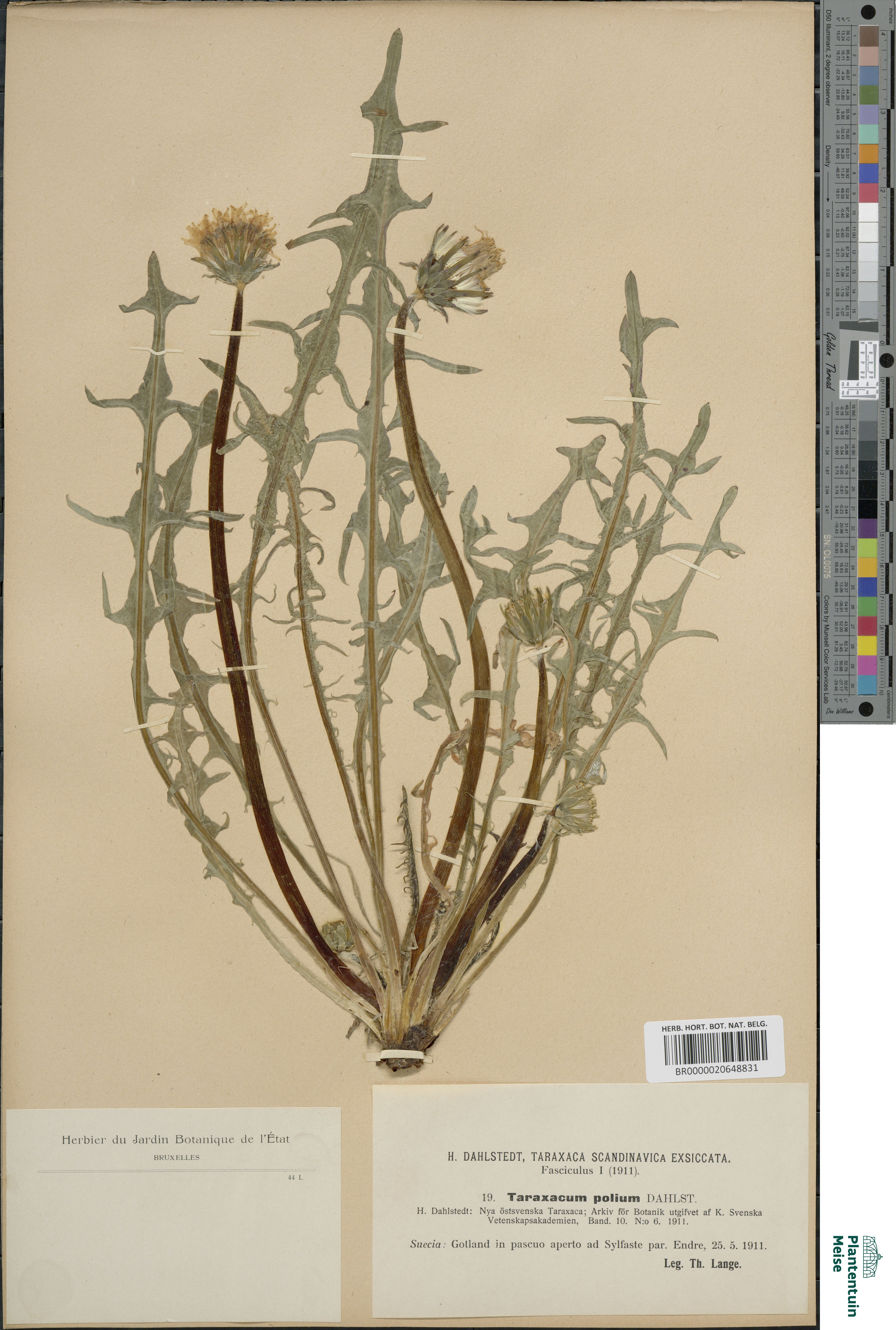
Taraxacum polium specimen collected in 1911

Taraxacum polium is a perennial herbaceous plant distinguished by its dense indumentum and finely divided leaves. The foliage is broadly green and covered with abundant white, hyaline hairs giving a bluish-grey appearance. Leaves are lanceolate to oblong in shape with long lobes, often reflexed at the base and more sigmoid or falcate above. Lobes are narrow, acute, and sometimes parallel-sided, with margins that are generally entire but may be weakly denticulate. The terminal lobe is hastate to sagittate, while the lateral lobes vary from patent to hamate or sigmoid. Upper lobes are typically narrower and more approximate than the lower ones. Some leaves exhibit pink coloration near the tips on the lower surface.

The scapes are slender, sparsely covered in arachnoid hairs, and often tinged with pink in the upper portions. The involucral bracts are short and broadly ovate. Outer bracts are green to dark purplish with purple or cornified tips; inner bracts are linear, paler in color, and may also appear purplish.

The capitulum is small, full, and convex, measuring 35–40 mm in diameter. Ligules are canaliculate with denticulate, purplish apices and dark violet basal markings. Anthers are dark violet, and styles are greenish and exserted beyond the corolla.

Achenes are approximately 2.5 mm long, with a conical, pyramidal apex and a pale rostrum measuring around 1 mm. The surface is ornamented with spinulose-tuberculate features and bears five distinct ribs. The species exhibits morphological features that show affinity with Taraxacum spectabile and T. nordstedtii, particularly in the structure of the involucre and the form of the achenes.

== Taxonomy ==
Taraxacum polium is a species of flowering plant in the family Asteraceae. It was first described in 1910 by Swedish botanist Gustav Adolf Hugo Dahlstedt, based on a specimen collected in Endre parish on the island of Gotland, Sweden. In his original description, Dahlstedt placed the species in Taraxacum section Vulgaria. More recent taxonomic treatments have reassigned it to section Celtica, which includes several morphologically similar species occurring in both Europe and western North America.

== Distribution and habitat ==
Taraxacum polium was native to southeastern Sweden, where it occurred primarily on the island of Gotland. The type specimen was collected in 1910 from a moist railway embankment in Endre parish. In its native range, the species inhabits grasslands, meadows, roadsides, and woodland margins, typically on moist or sandy soils. The species has been introduced to British Columbia, Canada, where it is found as a roadside and urban weed. A representative specimen was collected in urban Vancouver near the intersection of Clark Drive and East 13th Avenue, growing at the north edge of a small park along an alleyway.

== Extinction ==
After not having been sighted since 1964, it was classified as CR (Critically Endangered) in 2015, and as extinct in 2020. Reasons suggested are eutrophication, cultivation of damp grasslands and too high/low grazing pressure. As an apomictic species without possibility of genetic variation, it is also sensitive to environmental changes.
