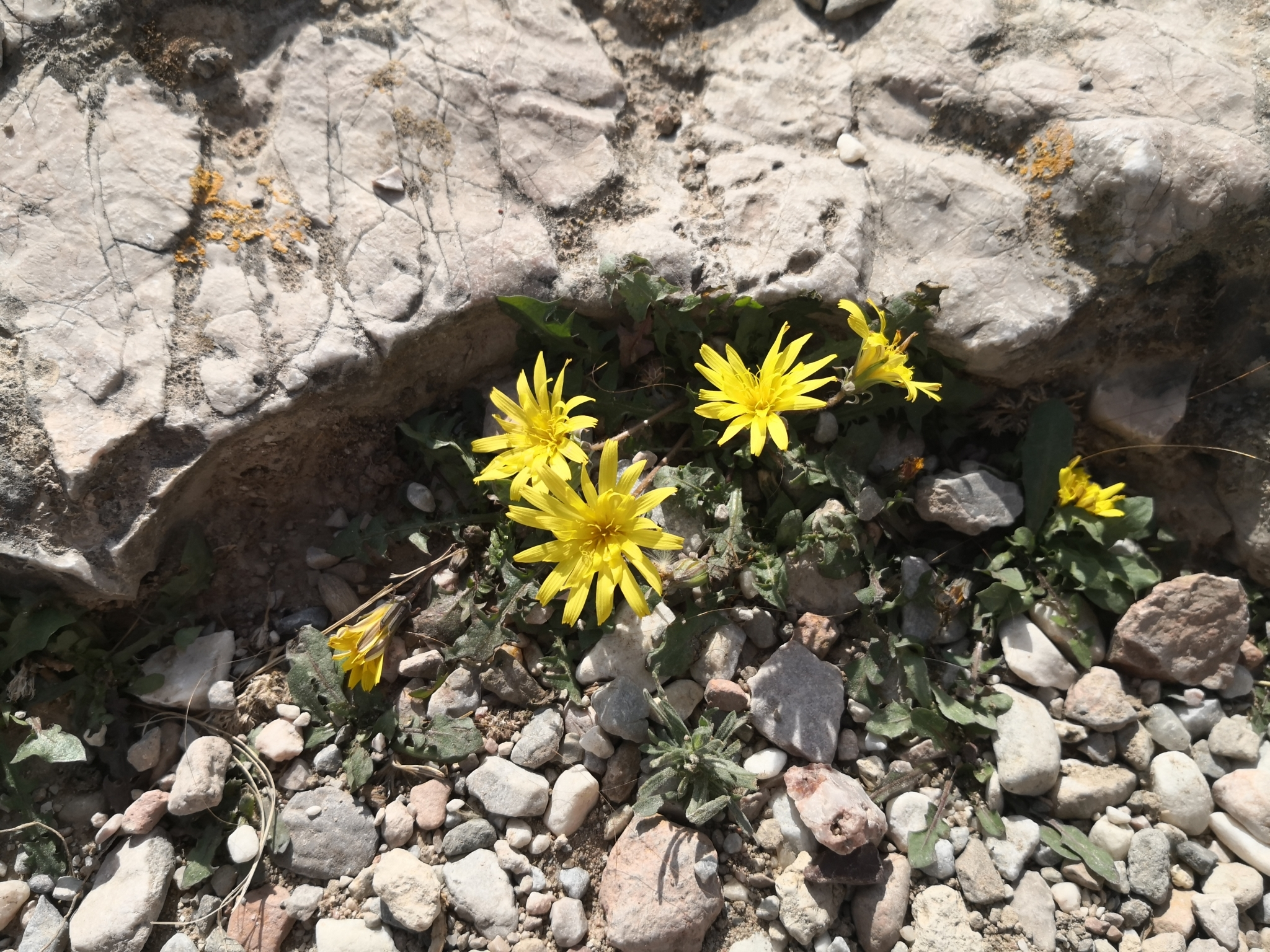

Scientific classification
- Kingdom: Plantae
- Clade: Embryophytes
- Clade: Tracheophytes
- Clade: Spermatophytes
- Clade: Angiosperms
- Clade: Eudicots
- Clade: Asterids
- Order: Asterales
- Family: Asteraceae
- Genus: Taraxacum
- Species: T. minimum

Binomial name
- Taraxacum minimum (V.Brig. ex Guss.) N.Terracc.

Synonyms
- Taraxacum briganti

= Taraxacum minimum =

Species of plant

Taraxacum minimum, also called the early dandelion or southern dandelion, is a perennial species of dandelion in the family Asteraceae. It is native to parts of the Mediterranean Basin, including southern Europe, North Africa, and the eastern Mediterranean region. It blooms from September to November, peaking in the middle of October.
