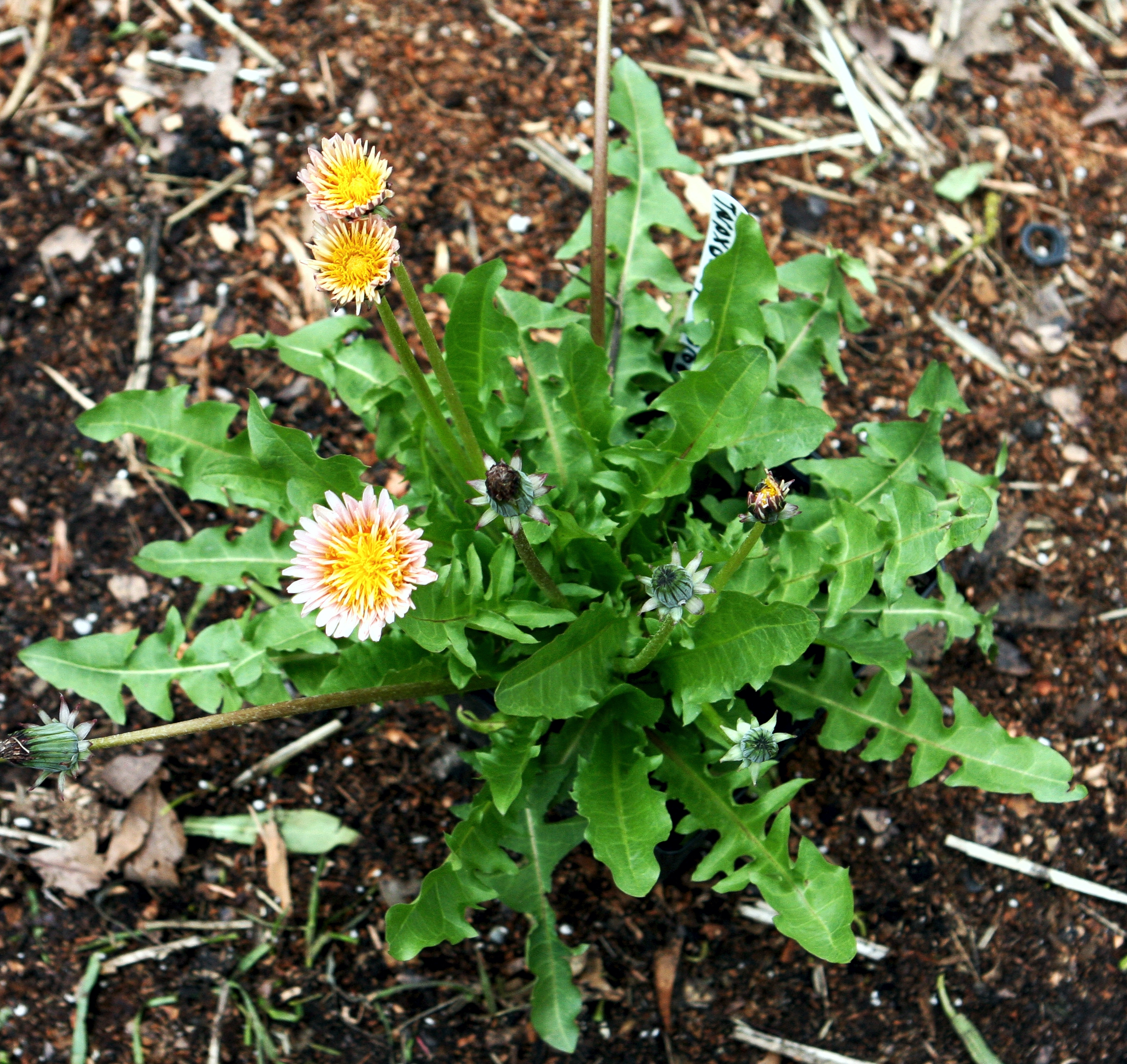
- Taraxacum pseudoroseum showing flower and habit

Scientific classification
- Kingdom: Plantae
- Clade: Tracheophytes
- Clade: Angiosperms
- Clade: Eudicots
- Clade: Asterids
- Order: Asterales
- Family: Asteraceae
- Genus: Taraxacum
- Species: T. pseudoroseum

Binomial name
- Taraxacum pseudoroseum Schischk.

= Taraxacum pseudoroseum =

Species of flowering plant

Taraxacum pseudoroseum is a species of flowering plant with the common name of pink dandelion, it is a perennial native to Central Asia.

It is a member of the family Asteraceae, and is related to the common dandelion, Taraxacum officinale. Unlike the common dandelion, which is native to Europe, Taraxacum pseudoroseum is not invasive, and is cultivated throughout the world.
