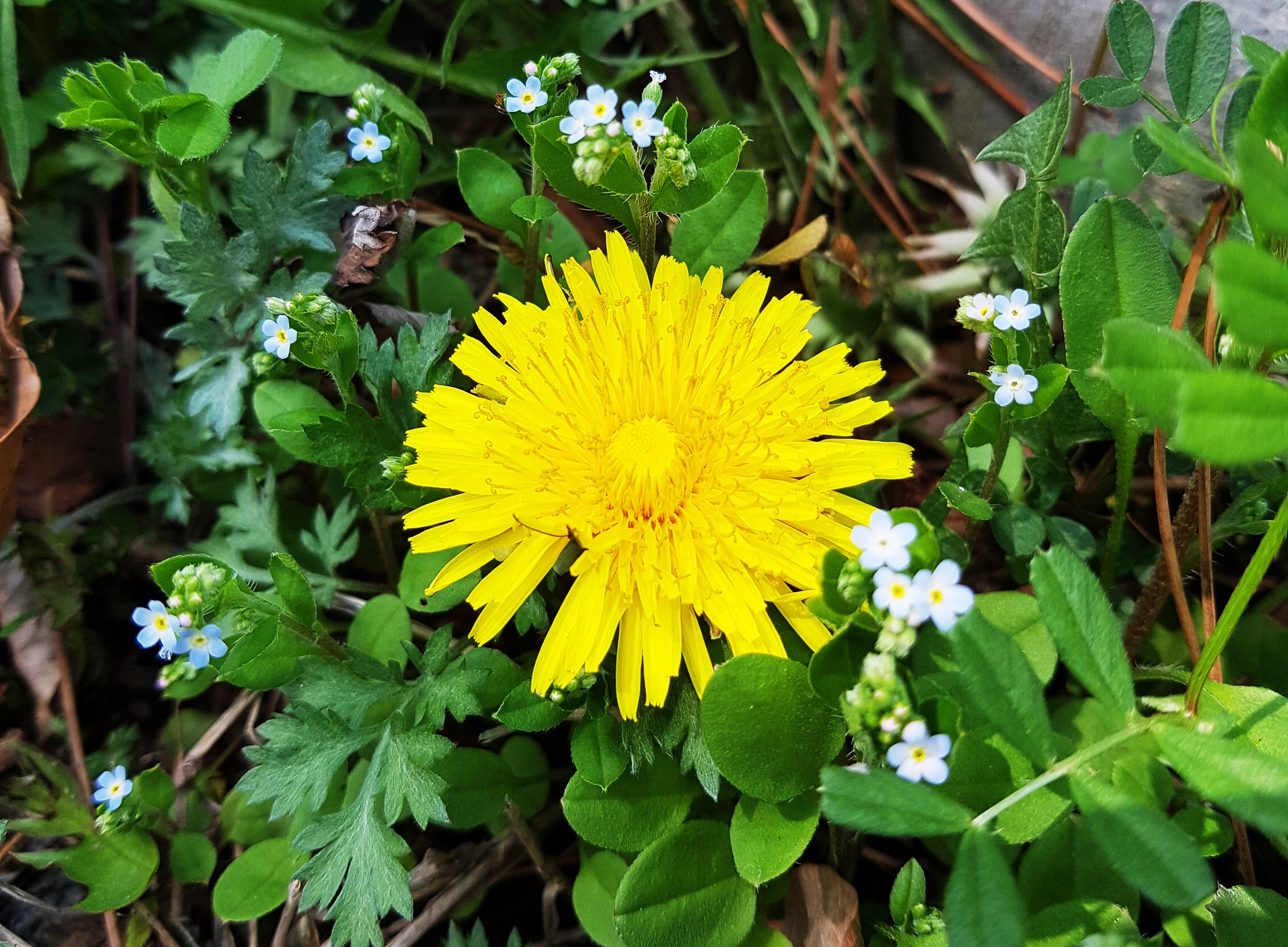

Scientific classification
- Kingdom: Plantae
- Clade: Tracheophytes
- Clade: Angiosperms
- Clade: Eudicots
- Clade: Asterids
- Order: Asterales
- Family: Asteraceae
- Genus: Taraxacum
- Species: T. platycarpum

Binomial name
- Taraxacum platycarpum Dahlst

= Taraxacum platycarpum =

Species of flowering plant

Taraxacum platycarpum, also called the Korean dandelion, is a species of dandelion that grows in Korea. A member of the Cichorieae tribe of the Asteraceae, it also grows in other countries as a native plant, such as China and Japan.

== Images ==
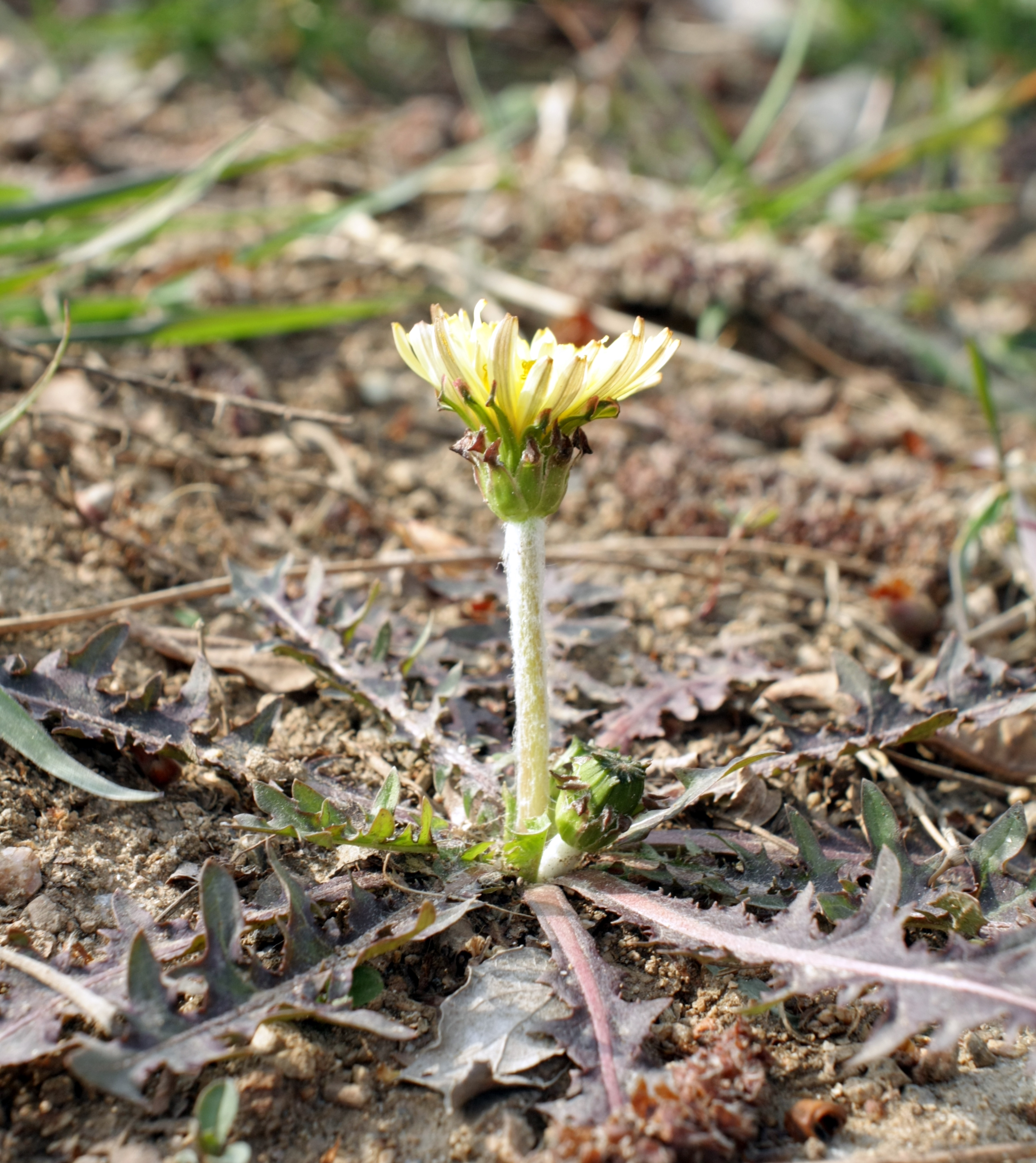
