= Taraxacum triforme =

Scientific classification
- Kingdom: Plantae
- Clade: Tracheophytes
- Clade: Angiosperms
- Clade: Eudicots
- Clade: Asterids
- Order: Asterales
- Family: Asteraceae
- Genus: Taraxacum
- Species: T. triforme

Binomial name
- Taraxacum triforme Soest

Dandelion species similar to the common dandelion

Taraxacum triforme is a species of dandelion endemic to the Monchique range in Portugal.
