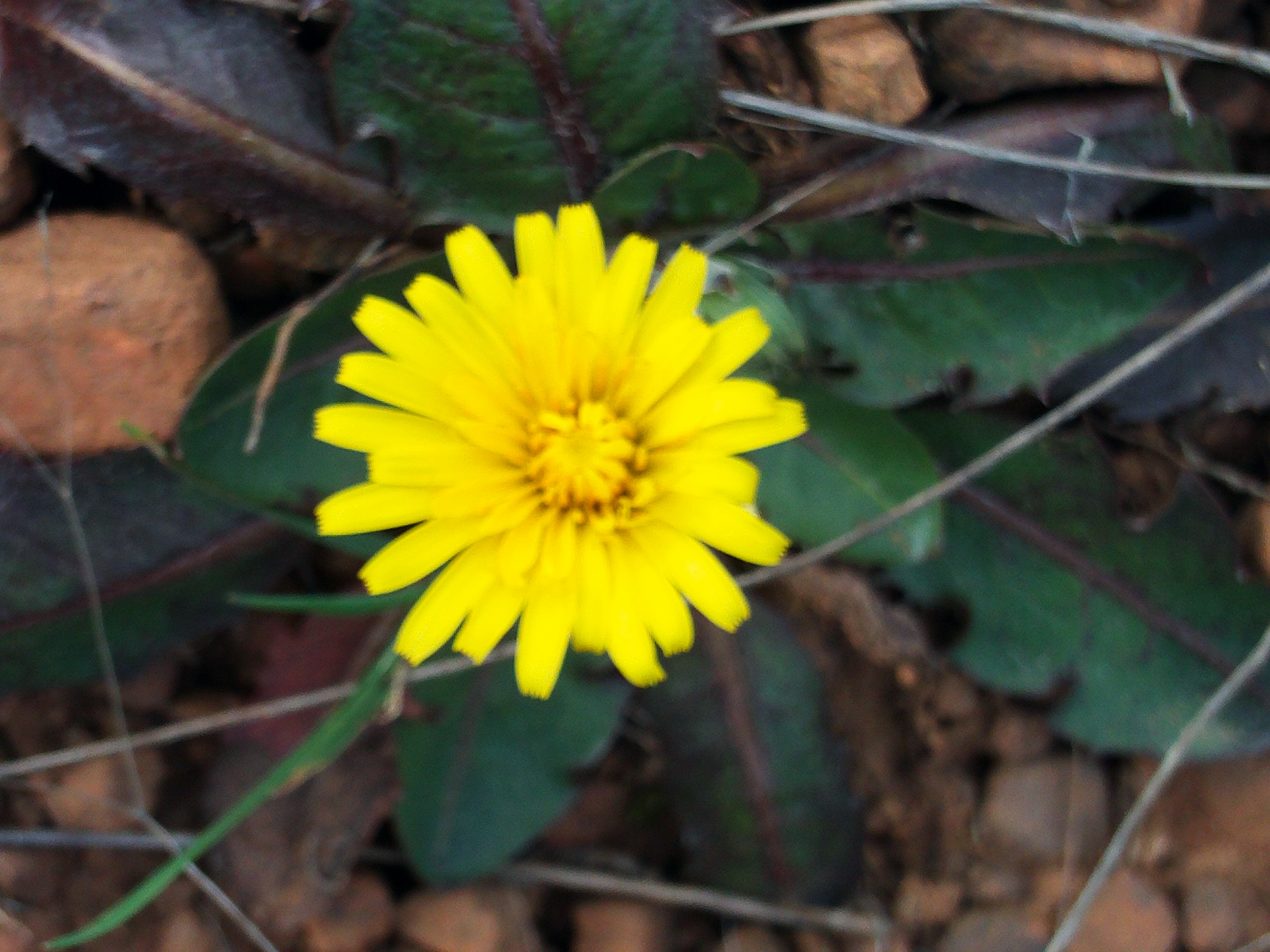

Scientific classification
- Kingdom: Plantae
- Clade: Tracheophytes
- Clade: Angiosperms
- Clade: Eudicots
- Clade: Asterids
- Order: Asterales
- Family: Asteraceae
- Genus: Taraxacum
- Species: T. laevigatum

Binomial name
- Taraxacum laevigatum DC.

= Taraxacum laevigatum =

Rock dandelion

Species of dandelion

Taraxacum laevigatum, the rock dandelion or red-seeded dandelion, is a species of dandelion that grows in Europe, including Great Britain. Rarely, Taraxacum laevigatum can be found in the northern parts of North America.
