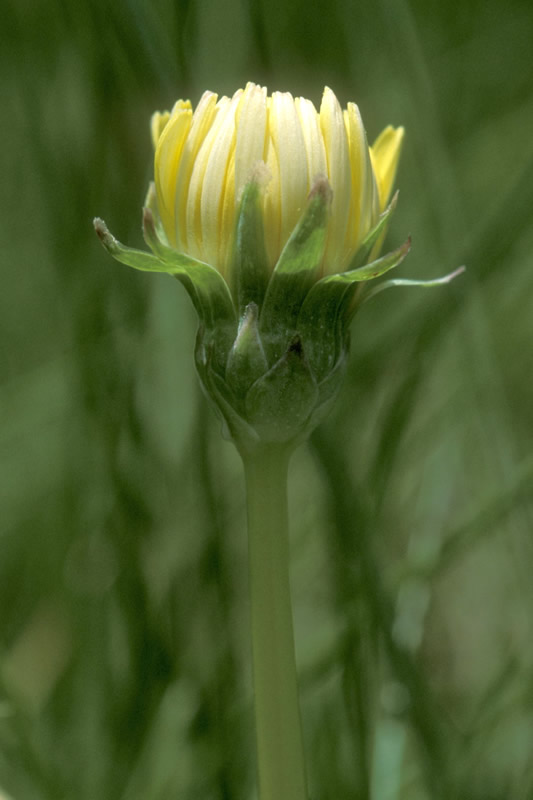

Conservation status
- Critically Imperiled (NatureServe)

- Endangered (ESA)

Scientific classification
- Kingdom: Plantae
- Clade: Tracheophytes
- Clade: Angiosperms
- Clade: Eudicots
- Clade: Asterids
- Order: Asterales
- Family: Asteraceae
- Genus: Taraxacum
- Species: T. californicum

Binomial name
- Taraxacum californicum Munz & I.M.Johnst.

= Taraxacum californicum =

Species of flowering plant

Taraxacum californicum, also known as the California dandelion, is an endangered species of dandelion endemic to the San Bernardino Mountains of California. It grows in mountain meadows.

Taraxacum californicum is a small perennial wildflower which resembles its close relative, the widespread weed known as the common dandelion (T. officinale). T. californicum has green, red-veined, lobed or toothed leaves and yellow flower heads yielding brown and white fruits.

There are fewer than 20 occurrences known of the plant, and several occurrences include just a few individuals. The plant can hybridize with the common dandelion, causing genetic pollution.
