= Taraxacum desertorum =

Conservation status
- Least Concern (IUCN 3.1)

Scientific classification
- Kingdom: Plantae
- Clade: Embryophytes
- Clade: Tracheophytes
- Clade: Spermatophytes
- Clade: Angiosperms
- Clade: Eudicots
- Clade: Asterids
- Order: Asterales
- Family: Asteraceae
- Genus: Taraxacum
- Species: T. desertorum

Binomial name
- Taraxacum desertorum Schischk.

Species of flowering plant

Taraxacum desertorum is a species of flowering plant in the family Asteraceae. It is called the desert dandelion. This species can be found in Azerbaijan and throughout the Caucasus.

== Status ==
The Taraxacum desertorum is listed as least concern by the IUCN.
