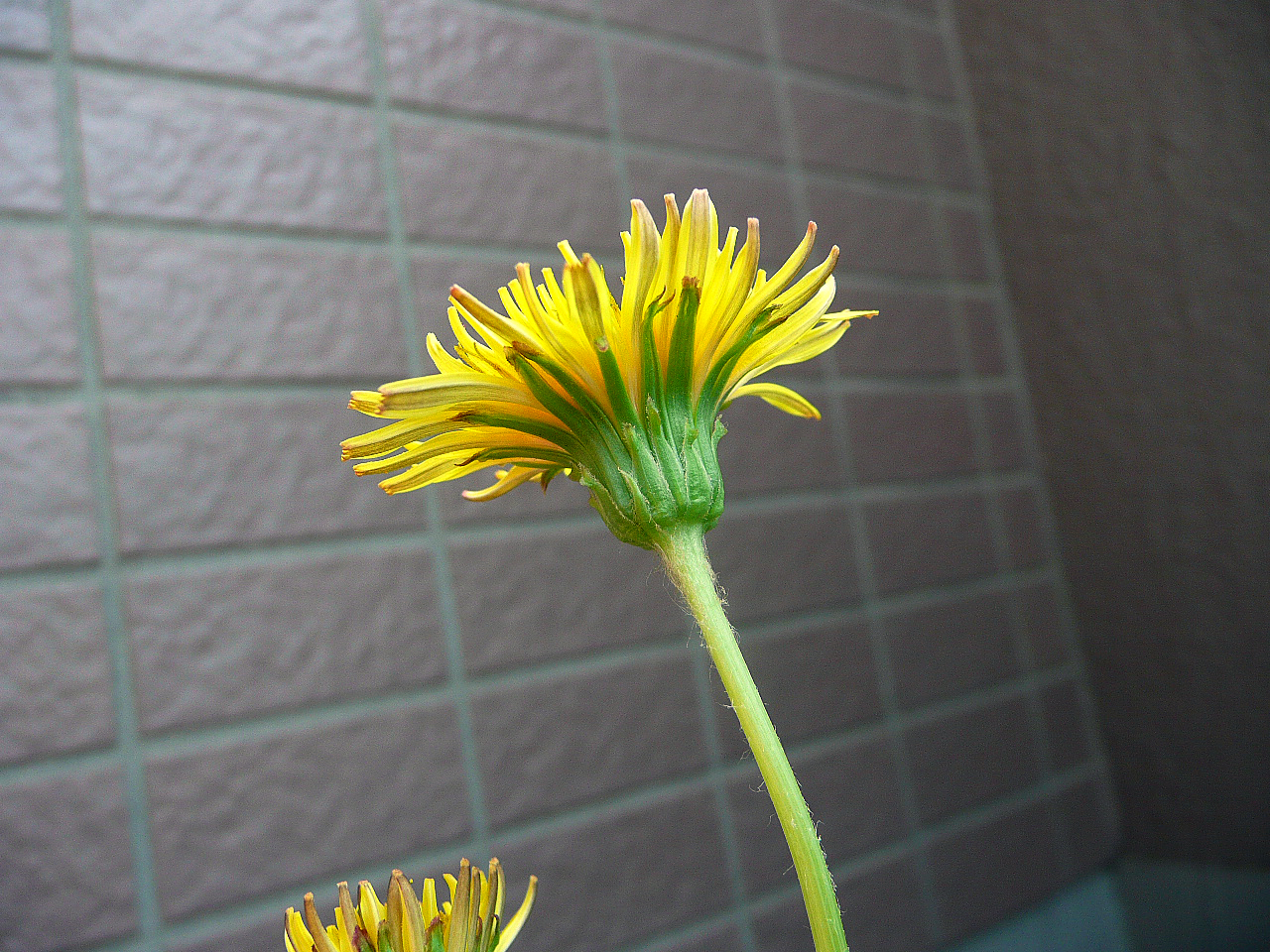
- A Taraxacum japonicum flower head.

Scientific classification
- Kingdom: Plantae
- Clade: Tracheophytes
- Clade: Angiosperms
- Clade: Eudicots
- Clade: Asterids
- Order: Asterales
- Family: Asteraceae
- Genus: Taraxacum
- Species: T. japonicum

Binomial name
- Taraxacum japonicum Koidz.

= Taraxacum japonicum =

Species of flowering plant

Taraxacum japonicum is a species of dandelion that grows in Japan.

== Images ==
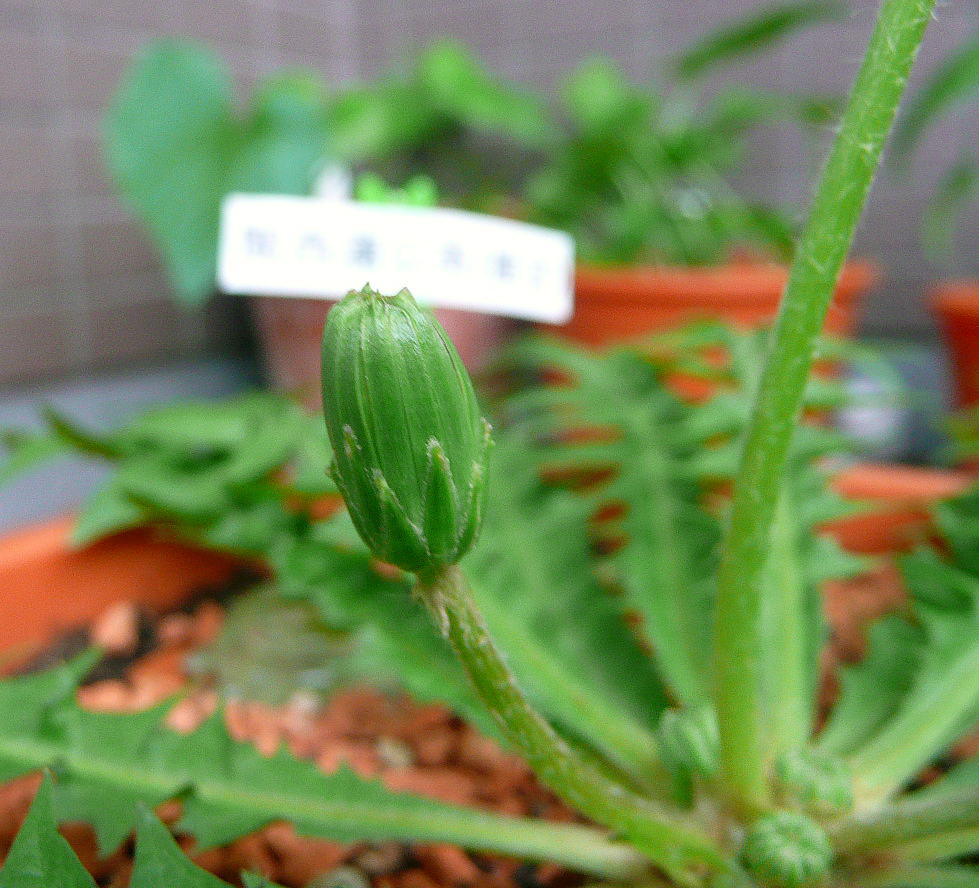
The bud of Taraxacum japonicum Koidz. No ring of smallish, downward-turned bracts under the flower head.

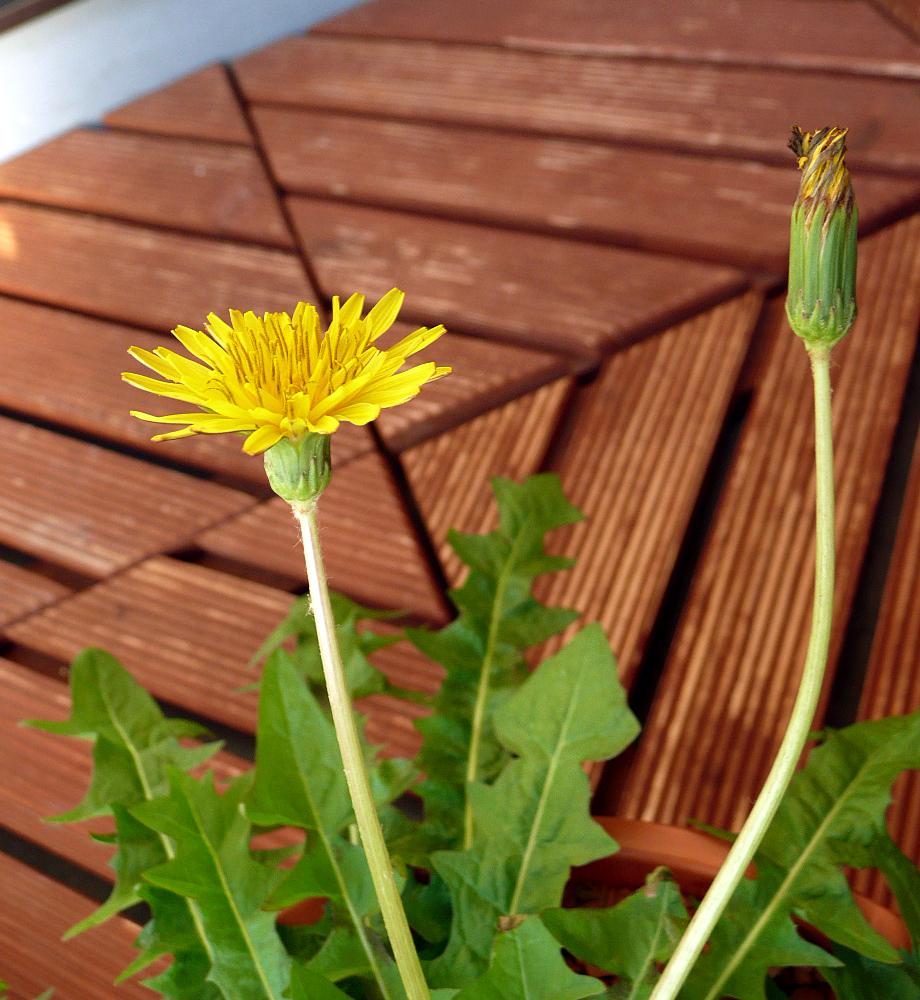
The length of outside bracteoles is about 1/3 of the length of inside bracteoles

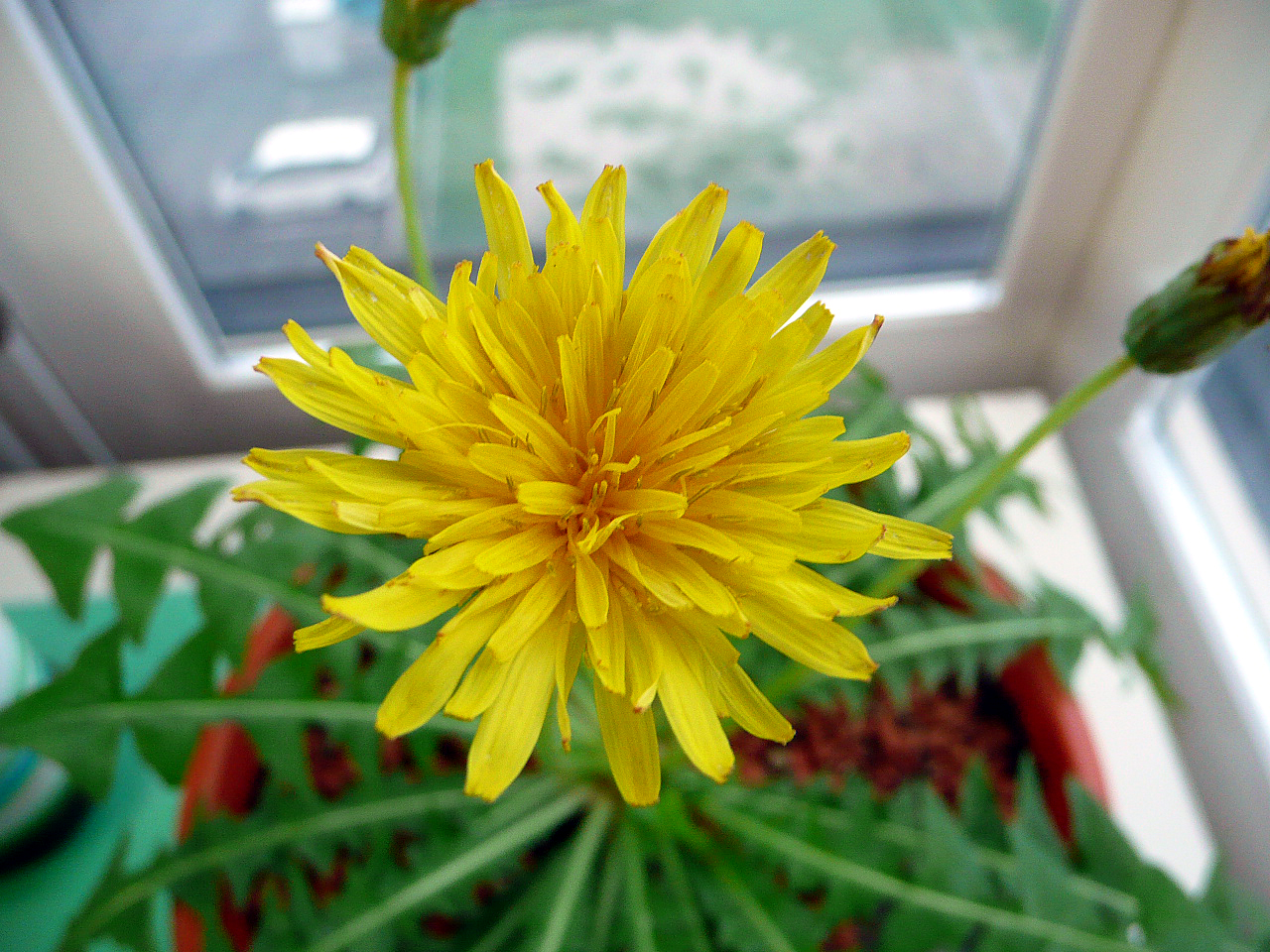
Head in full bloom. A Taraxacum japonicum flower has fewer florets than that of Taraxacum officinale.
