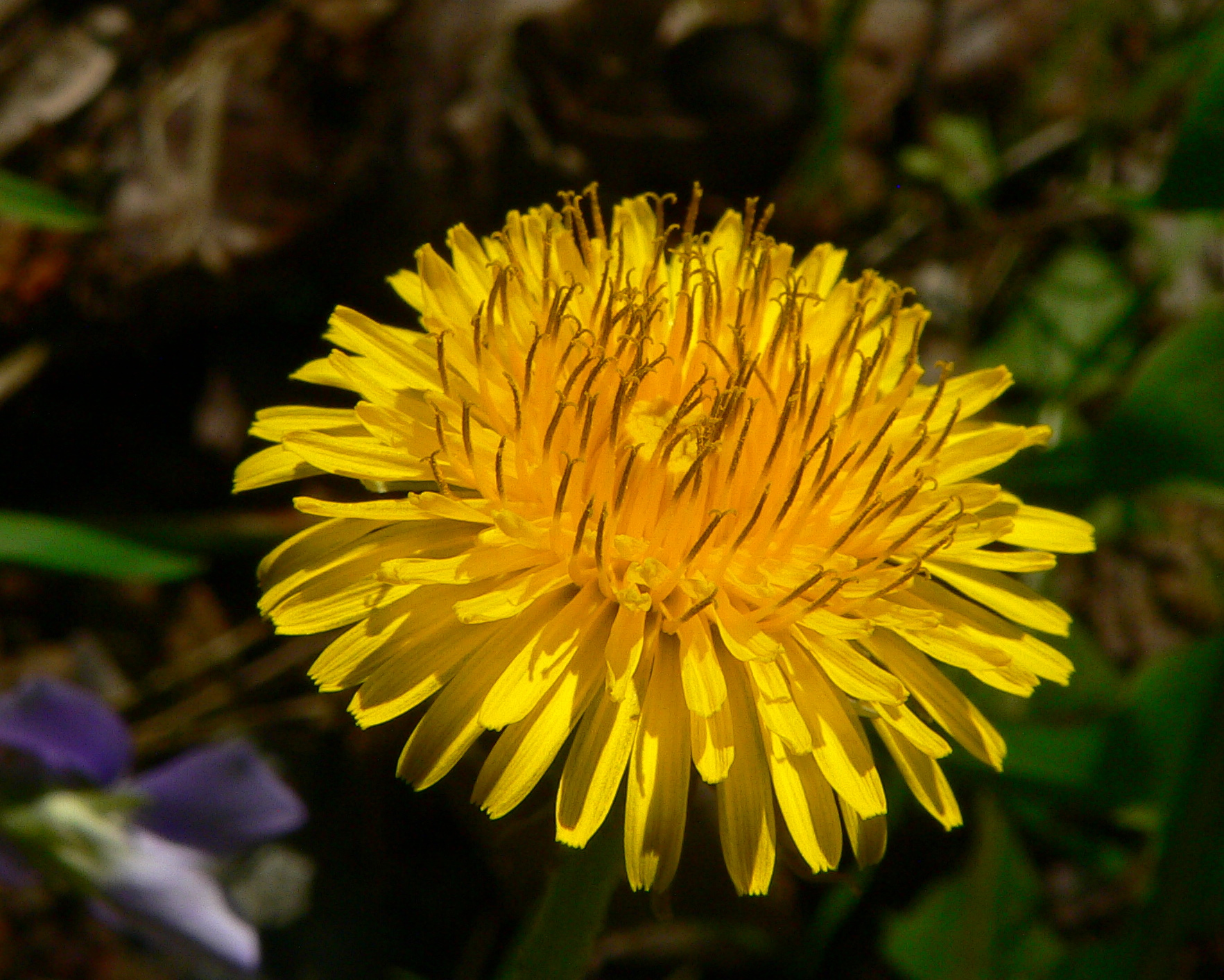

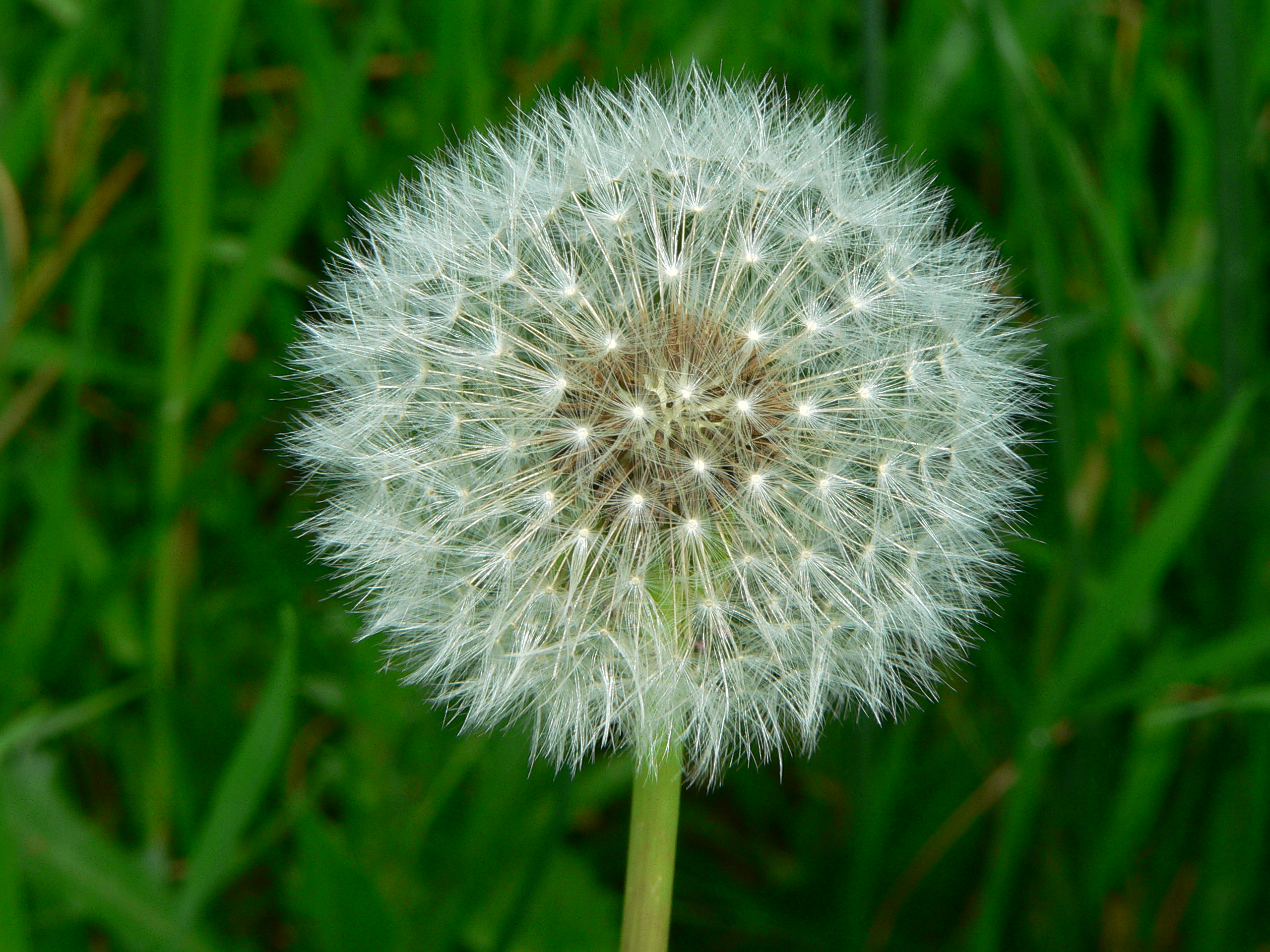
- A common dandelion (T. officinale) flower head composed of numerous small florets (top); the seed head is shown below it.

Scientific classification
- Kingdom: Plantae
- Clade: Tracheophytes
- Clade: Angiosperms
- Clade: Eudicots
- Clade: Asterids
- Order: Asterales
- Family: Asteraceae
- Subfamily: Cichorioideae
- Tribe: Cichorieae
- Subtribe: Crepidinae
- Genus: Taraxacum; F. H. Wigg.

Type species
- Taraxacum officinale F.H.Wigg.

Species
- See list of Taraxacum species

Synonyms
- List: Caramanica Tineo; Eriopus D.Don; Lasiopus D.Don; Neo-taraxacum Y.R.Ling & X.D.Sun; Wendelboa Soest

= Taraxacum =

Taraxacum Temporal range: Miocene–recent, 16.2–0 Ma

Genus of flowering plants

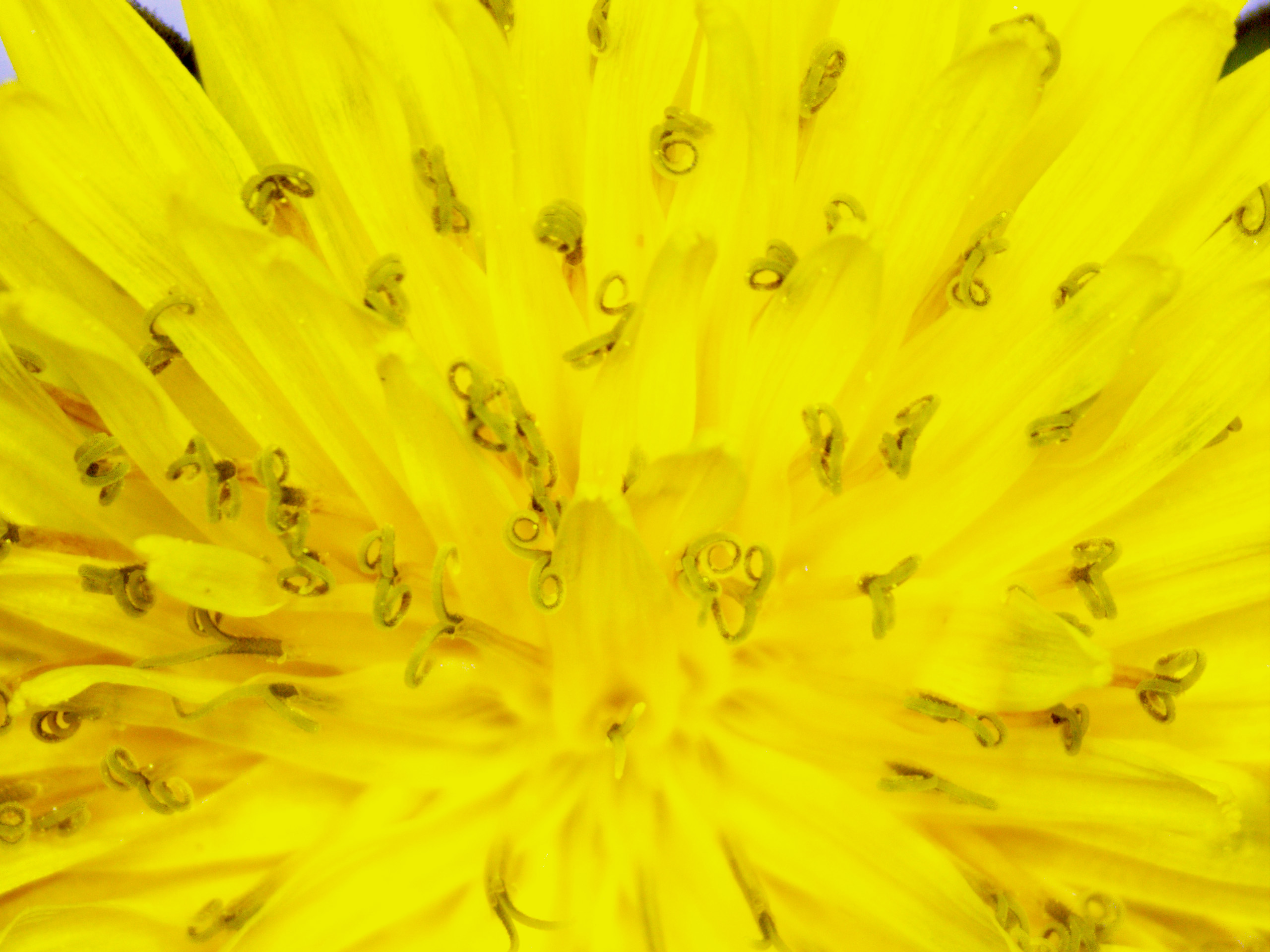
Dandelion bilobed stigma bearing pollen

Taraxacum (/təˈræksəkəm/) is a genus of flowering plants in the family Asteraceae which consists of species commonly known as dandelions. The scientific and hobby study of the genus is known as taraxacology. The genus has a near-cosmopolitan distribution, absent only from tropical and polar areas. Two of the most common species worldwide, T. officinale (the common dandelion) and T. erythrospermum (the red-seeded dandelion), are European species. These have also been introduced into North America, where they are non native. Dandelions thrive in temperate regions and can be found in yards, gardens, sides of roads, among crops, and in many other habitats.

Like other members of the family Asteraceae, they have very small flowers collected together into a composite flower head. Each single flower in a head is called a floret. In part due to their abundance, along with being a generalist species, dandelions are one of the most vital early spring nectar sources for a wide host of pollinators. Many Taraxacum species produce seeds asexually by apomixis, where the seeds are produced without pollination, resulting in offspring that are genetically identical to the parent plant.

== Etymology ==
The Latin name Taraxacum derives from the Arabic tarakhshaqūn, meaning "bitter herb". The Arabic term is possibly of Persian origin. Persian polymath Al-Razi used the word tarakhshaqūn in relation to dandelions, chicory, and endives. Al-Razi wrote "the tarakhshaqūn is like chicory, but more efficacious"; it is unclear exactly to which plant Al-Razi referred however. If Persian in origin, the word could have originally meant "bitter purslane" from تلک (talk, 'bitter') and چکش (chakūk, 'purslane'). Gerard of Cremona, in translating Arabic to Latin around 1170, spelled it tarasacon.

The English name, dandelion, is a borrowing of the French dent de lion meaning "lion's tooth", referring to the coarsely toothed leaves. This is still the name it carries in German and Norwegian (løvetann). The plant is also known as blowball, cankerwort, doon-head-clock, witch's gowan, milk witch, lion's-tooth, yellow-gowan, Irish daisy, monks-head, priest's-crown, and puff-ball; other common names include faceclock, pee-a-bed, wet-a-bed, swine's snout, white endive, and wild endive. The English folk name "piss-a-bed" (and the equivalent French pissenlit) refers to the strong diuretic effect of the plant's leaves. In Swedish, it is called maskros (worm rose) after the thrip nymphs usually present on the plant.

== Description ==
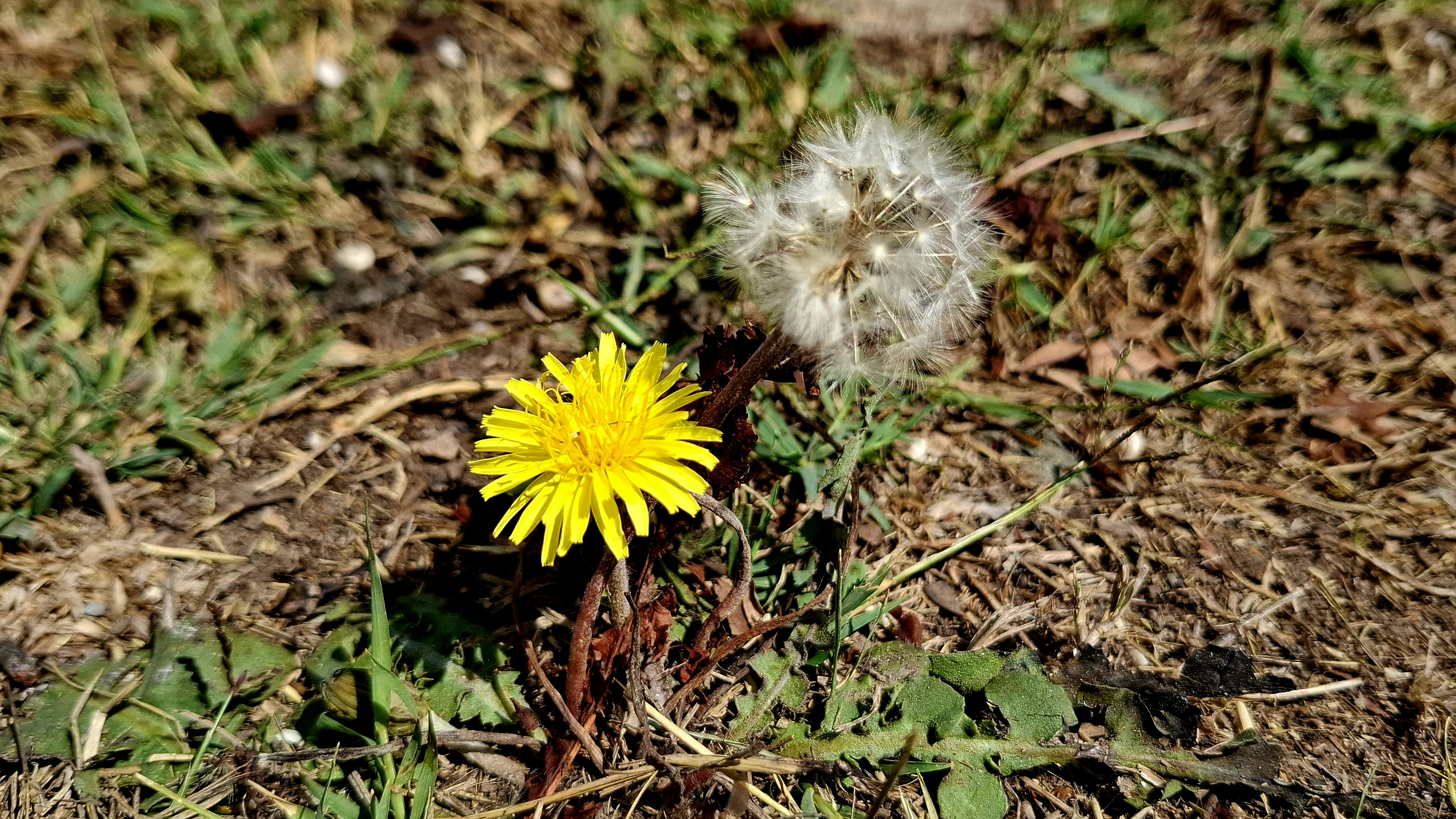
Two stages in the life cycle of a common dandelion (Taraxacum officinale) – flower head and seed head

Taraxacum species are tap-rooted, perennial, herbaceous plants, native to temperate areas of the Northern Hemisphere. The genus contains many species, which usually (or in the case of triploids, obligately) reproduce by apomixis, resulting in many local populations and endemism. In the British Isles alone, 234 microspecies (i.e. morphologically distinct clonal populations) are recognised in nine loosely defined sections. A number of Taraxacum species can act as ruderals, pioneer species that rapidly colonise disturbed soil. The common dandelion (T. officinale) has been introduced over much of the temperate world, and it is especially effective at spreading along roads, cemeteries, lawns, and pastures. A week or two after flowering, the dandelion's flower becomes a round seed head. The bracts, specialized leaves around the flower, curve backwards. The parachute ball fully opens into a sphere, and the yellow petals fall away. When development is complete, the mature seeds are attached to white, fluffy "parachutes", which easily detach from the seed head and glide on the wind, dispersing.

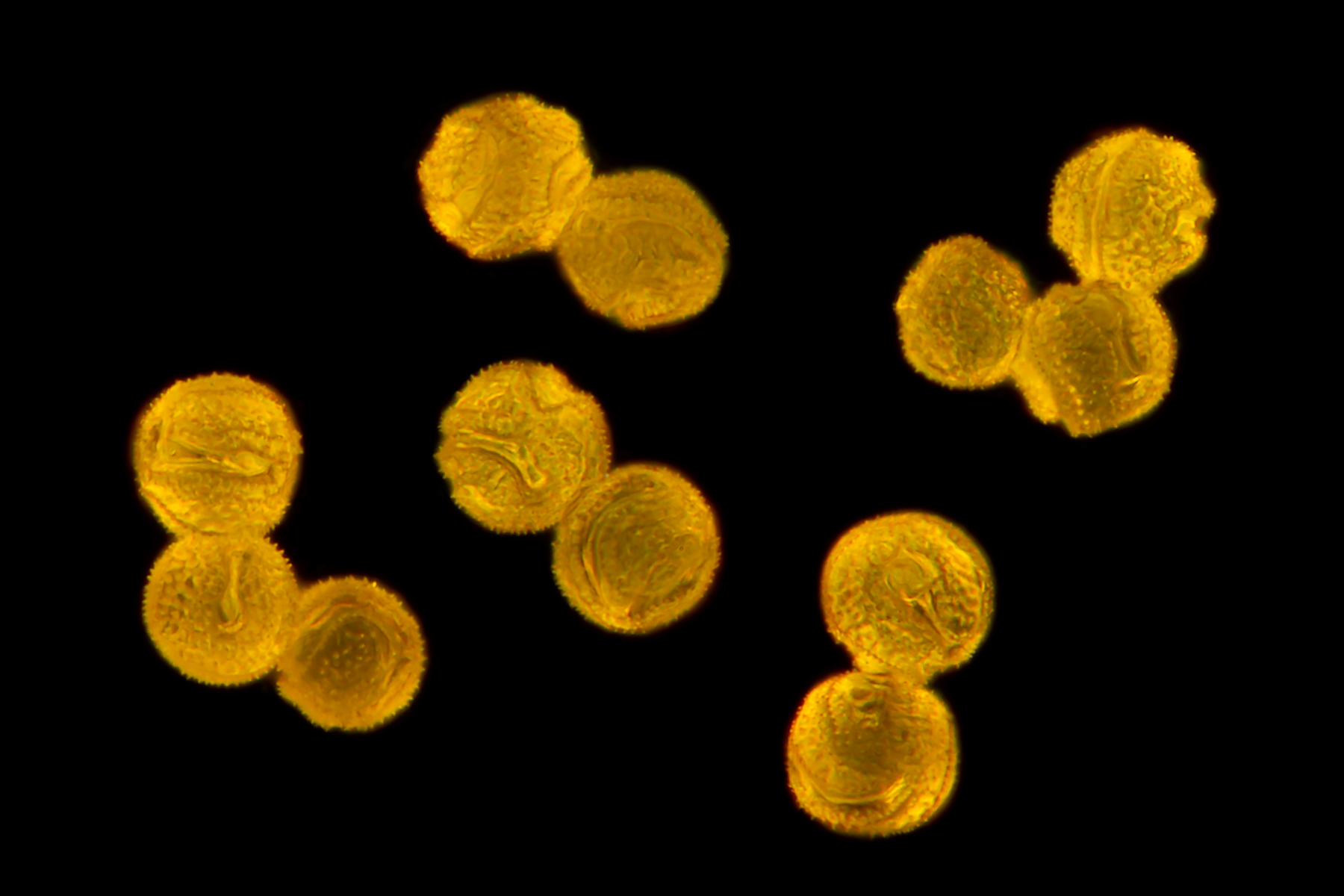
Individual pollen grains of T. officinale

In general, the leaves are 5–25 centimetres (2.0–9.8 in) long or longer, simple, lobed-to-pinnatisect, forming a basal rosette above the central taproot. The flower heads range from yellow to orange, and are typically open during sunlight and\or on warmer days, but closed at night. The heads are attached to a hollow stem (scape) that is usually leafless and rises 1–10 centimetres (0.4–3.9 in) or more above the ground. Stems and leaves exude a white, milky latex when broken. A rosette may produce several flowering stems at a time. The flower heads are 2–5 centimetres (0.8–2.0 in) in diameter and consist entirely of ray florets. The flower heads mature into spherical seed heads, sometimes called blowballs or clocks, containing many single-seeded fruits named cypselae, which are similar to achenes. Each cypsela is attached to a pappus of fine hair-like material, which enables anemochorous (wind-aided) dispersal over long distances.

The seeds are able to cover large distances when dispersed due to the unique morphology of the pappus, which works to create a unique type of vortex ring that stays attached to the seed rather than being sent downstream. In addition to the creation of this vortex ring, the pappus can adjust its morphology depending on the moisture in the air; this allows the plume of seeds to close up and reduce the chance to separate from the stem, waiting for optimal conditions that will maximise dispersal and germination.

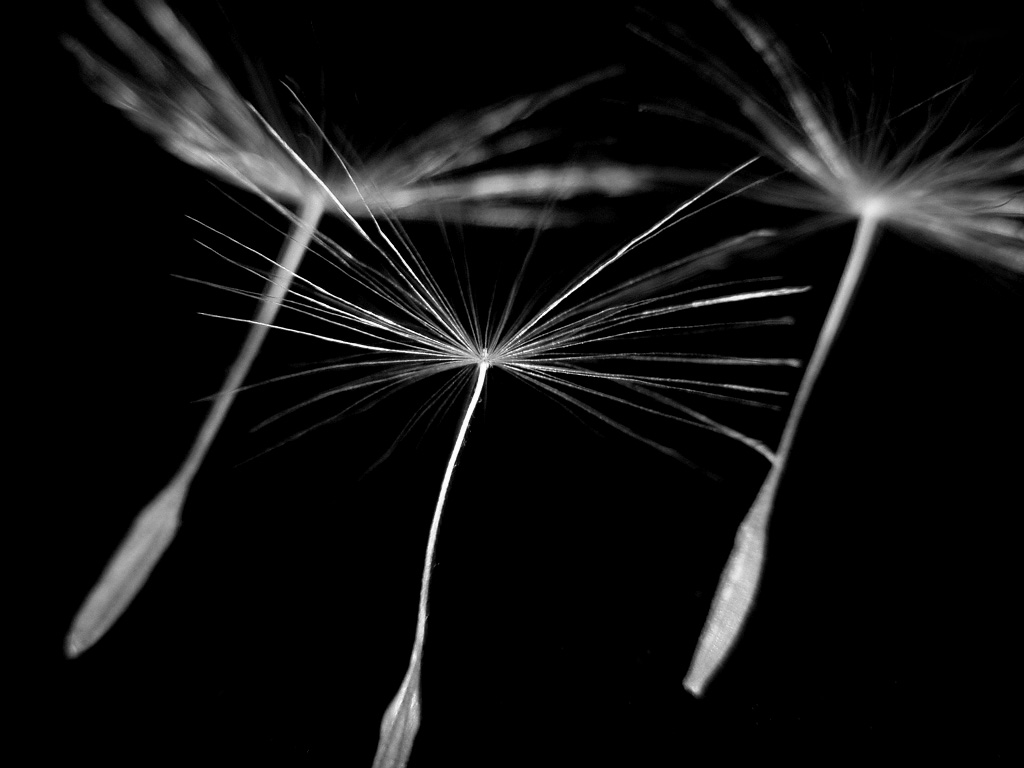
The pappus of a dandelion seed, which aids in wind-driven dispersal

In Taraxacum ovules, the megaspore mother cell is the only cell committed to enter the meiotic process. T. officinale is able to reproduce by a sexual meiotic process involving the production of haploid gametes, as well as by an asexual parthenogenetic meiotic process, referred to as apomixis, that produces diploid seeds genetically identical to the mother plant. Parthenogenesis permits the autonomous development of an unreduced egg cell into an embryo without the requirement of fertilisation.

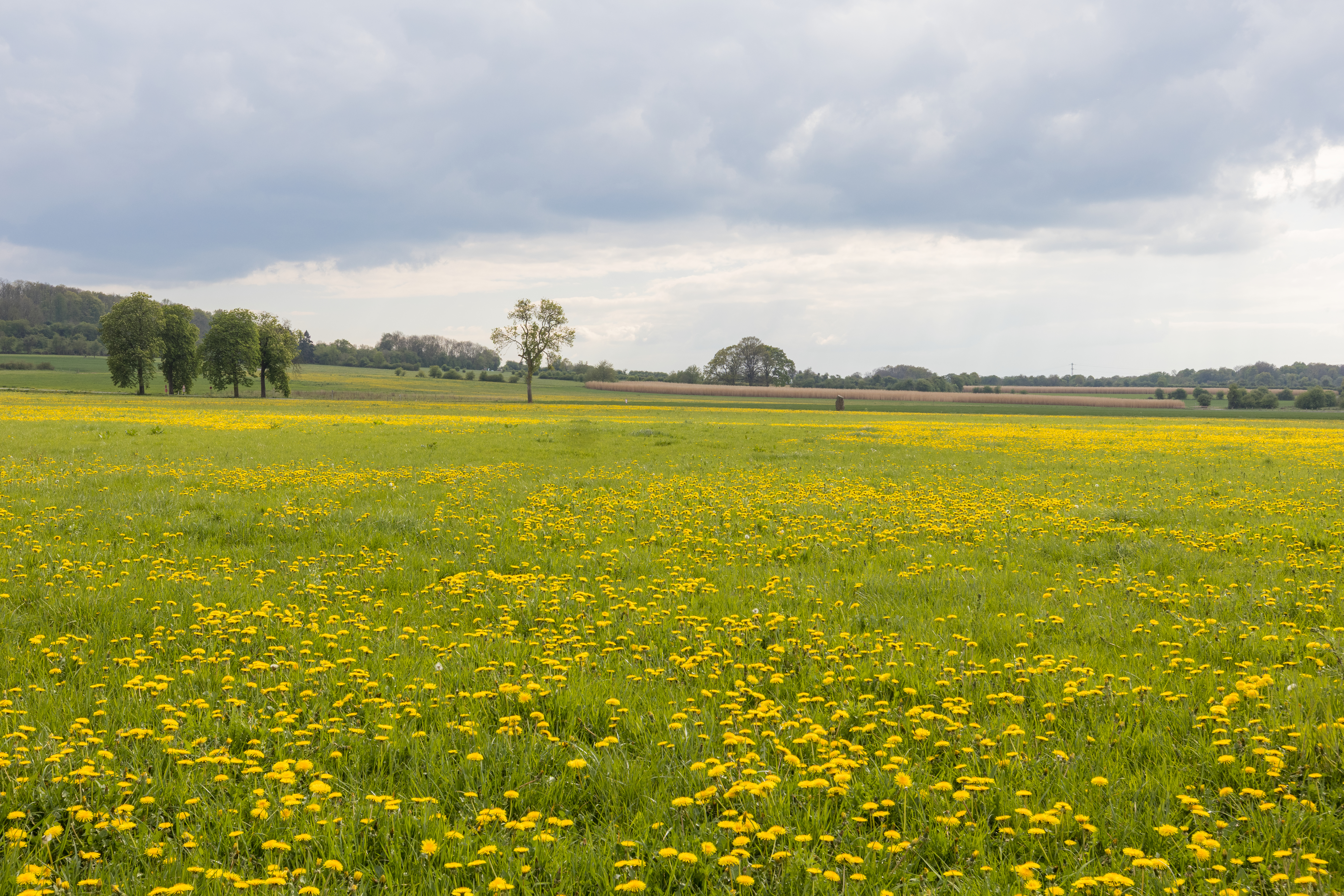
Field of dandelions, Wéris, Belgium

Taraxacum flowers contain various phytochemicals, including polyphenols such as flavonoids apigenin, isoquercitrin (a quercetin-like compound), and caffeic acid, as well as terpenoids, triterpenes, and sesquiterpenes. The roots contain a substantial amount of the prebiotic fibre inulin. Dandelion greens contain lutein. Taraxalisin, a serine proteinase, is found in the latex of dandelion roots. Maximal activity of the proteinase in the roots is attained in April, at the beginning of plant development after the winter period. Each dandelion seed produced in the spring weighs about half a milligram (mg). Seeds produced in summer are lighter, around 0.3 mg.

=== Similar plants ===
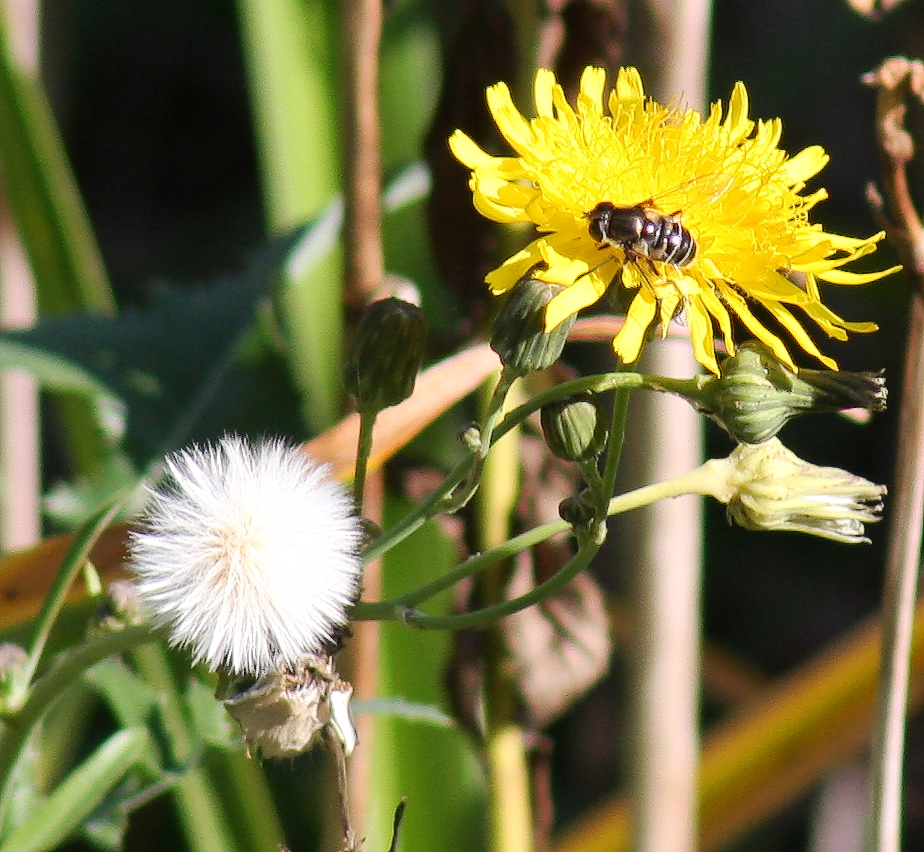
Hawksbeard flower heads and ripe seeds are sometimes confused with dandelions.

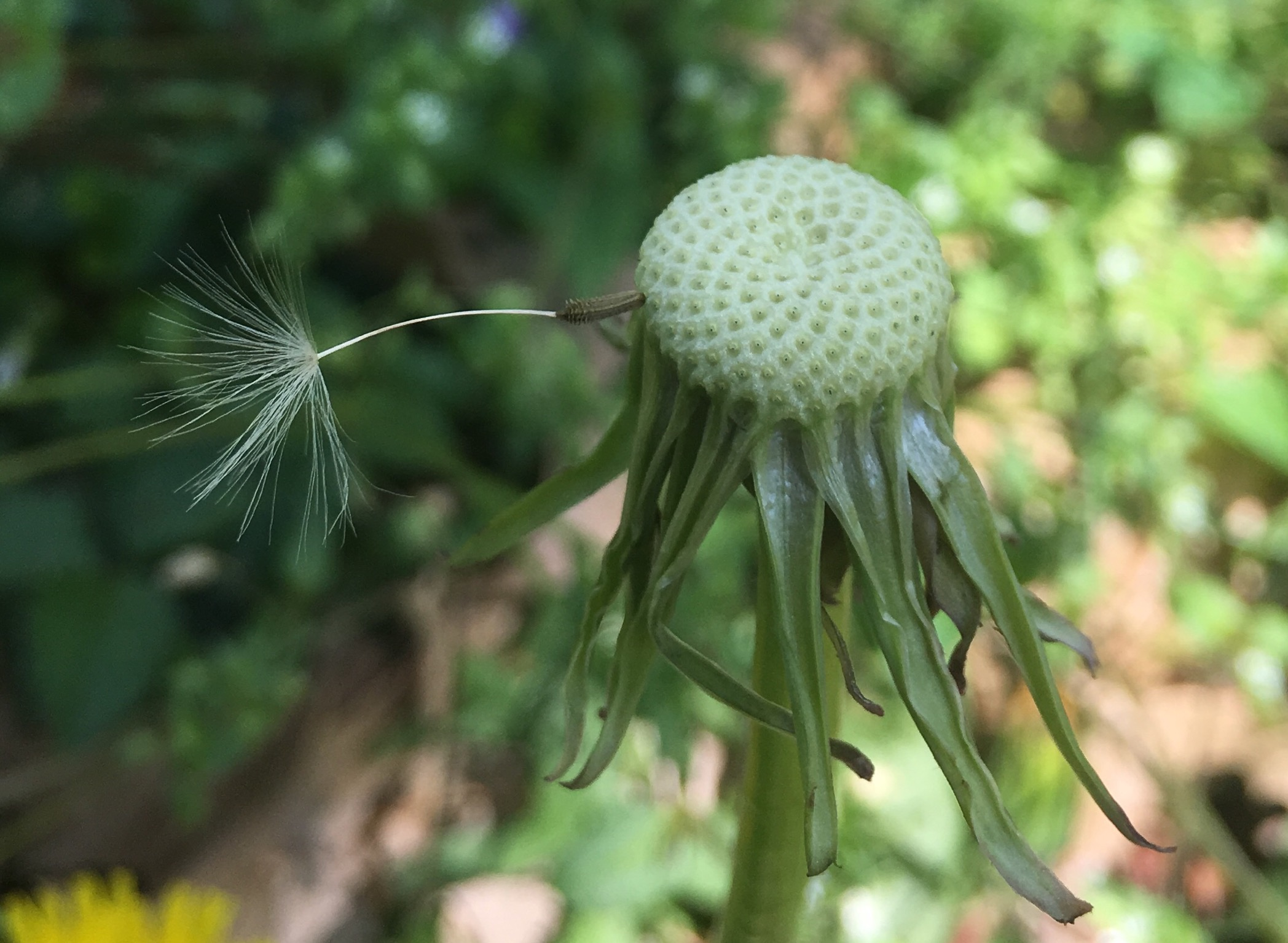
T. officinale seed head with only one seed still attached

Many plants in the family Asteraceae with yellow flowers are sometimes known as false dandelions. In the case of cat's ear (Hypochaeris), both plants carry similar flowers, which form into windborne seeds. However, dandelion have unbranched, hairless and leafless, hollow stems, while cat's ear stems are branched, solid, and carry bracts. Both plants have a basal rosette of leaves and a central taproot. However, the leaves of dandelions are smooth, whereas those of cat's ear are hairy. Early-flowering dandelions may be distinguished from coltsfoot (Tussilago farfara) by their basal rosette of leaves, their lack of disc florets, and the absence of scales on the flowering stem. Other plants with superficially similar flowers include hawkweeds (Hieracium) and hawksbeards (Crepis). These are distinguished by branched stems, which are usually hairy and bear leaves.

== Classification ==
The genus is taxonomically complex due to the presence of apomixis; any morphologically distinct clonal population would deserve its own microspecies. About 235 apomictic and polyploid microspecies have been recorded in Great Britain and Ireland alone. Phylogenetic approaches are also complicated by the accelerated mutation in apomixic lines and repeated ancient hybridisation events in the genus.

By 1970, the group was divided into about 34 macrospecies or sections, and about 2000 microspecies; By 2015, the number had been revised to include 60 sections and about 2800 microspecies. 30 of these sections are known to reproduce sexually. In Sweden alone, there are about 1000 microspecies present. 100 of them are redlisted or near redlisted, among them Taraxacum duplidentifrons.

Taraxacum polium is classified as extinct worldwide.

Botanists specialising in the genus Taraxacum are sometimes called taraxacologists, such as Gunnar Marklund, Johannes Leendert van Soest and A.J. Richards.

=== Selected species ===
- Taraxacum albidum, the white-flowered Japanese dandelion, a hybrid between T. coreanum and T. japonicum
- Taraxacum algarbiense
- Taraxacum aphrogenes, the Paphos dandelion
- Taraxacum arcticum
- Taraxacum balticum
- Taraxacum brachyceras
- Taraxacum brevicorniculatum, frequently misidentified as T. kok-saghyz and a poor rubber producer
- Taraxacum californicum, the California dandelion, an endangered species
- Taraxacum carneocoloratum
- Taraxacum centrasiaticum, the Xinjiang dandelion
- Taraxacum ceratophorum, the horned dandelion, considered by some sources to be a North American subspecies of T. officinale (T. officinale subsp. ceratophorum)
- Taraxacum coreanum
- Taraxacum cyprium H.Lindb.
- Taraxacum desertorum
- Taraxacum erythrospermum, the red-seeded dandelion, often considered a variety of T. laevigatum (i.e., T. laevigatum var. erythrospermum)
- Taraxacum farinosum, the Turkish dandelion
- Taraxacum holmboei, the Troödos dandelion
- Taraxacum hybernum
- Taraxacum japonicum, the Japanese dandelion, no ring of smallish, downward-turned leaves under the flower head
- Taraxacum kok-saghyz, the Kazakh dandelion, which produces rubber
- Taraxacum laevigatum, the rock dandelion, achenes reddish brown and leaves deeply cut throughout the length, inner bracts' tips are hooded
- Taraxacum lissocarpum
- Taraxacum minimum
- Taraxacum mirabile
- Taraxacum officinale (syn. T. officinale subsp. vulgare), the common dandelion, found in many forms
- Taraxacum pankhurstianum, the St. Kilda dandelion
- Taraxacum platycarpum, the Korean dandelion
- Taraxacum pseudoroseum
- Taraxacum rubifolium
- Taraxacum suecicum

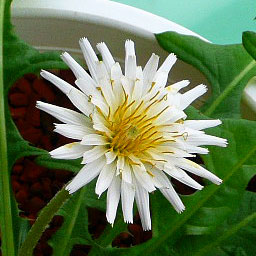
T. albidum

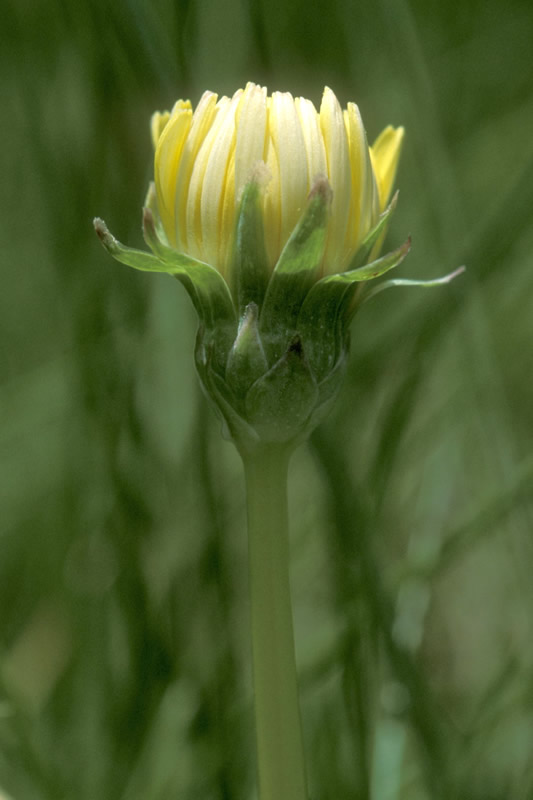
T. californicum

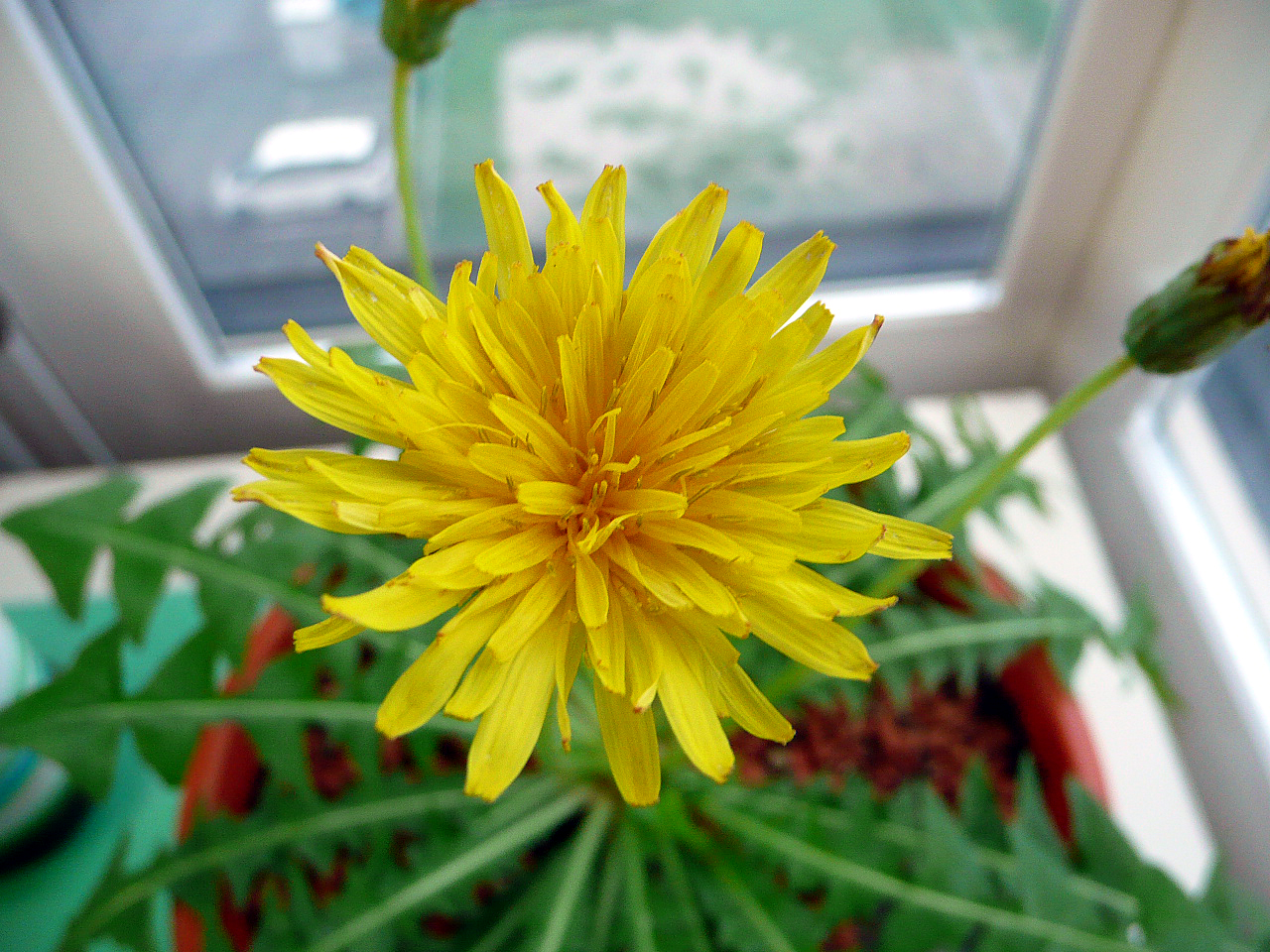
T. japonicum

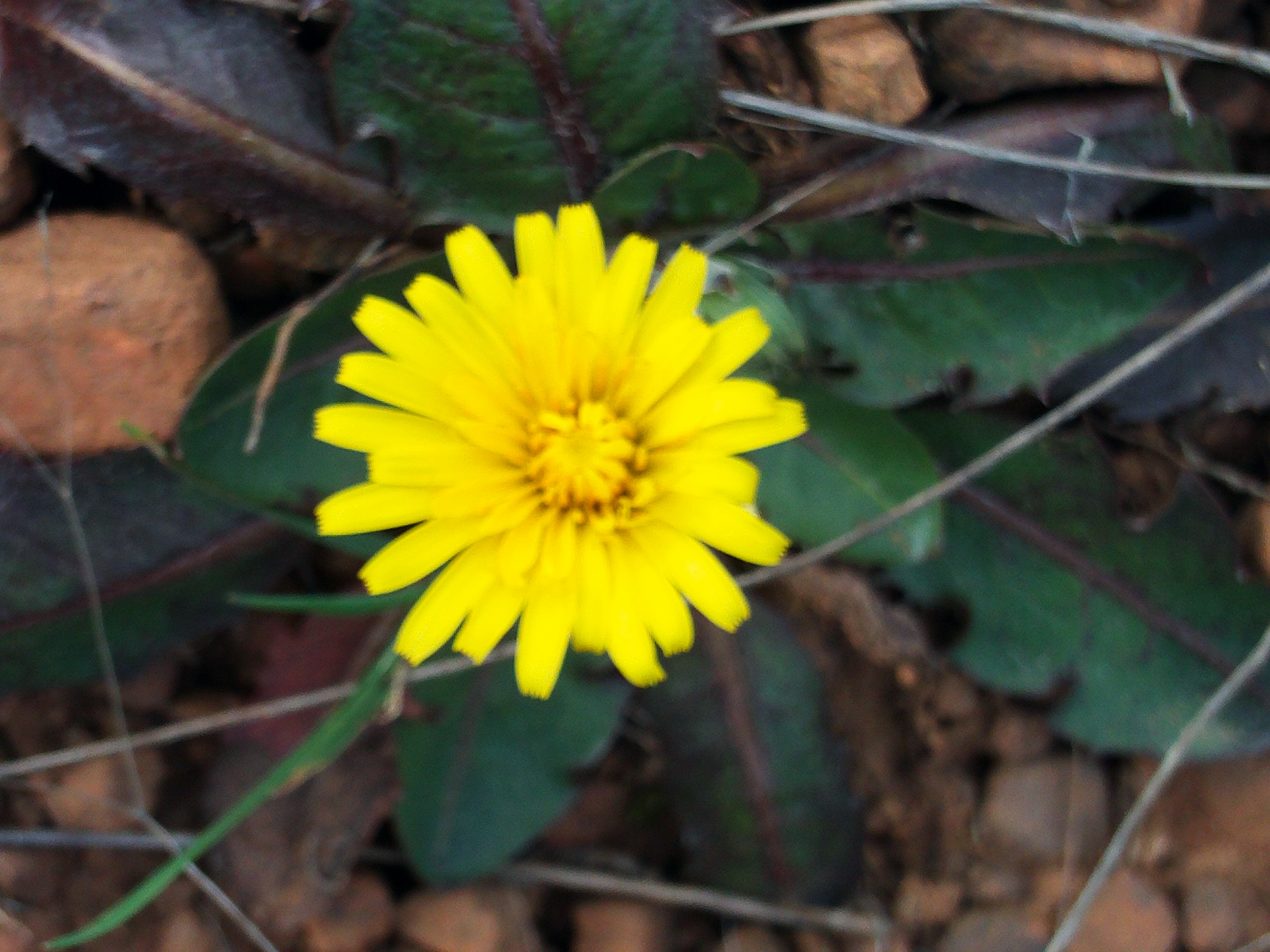
T. laevigatum

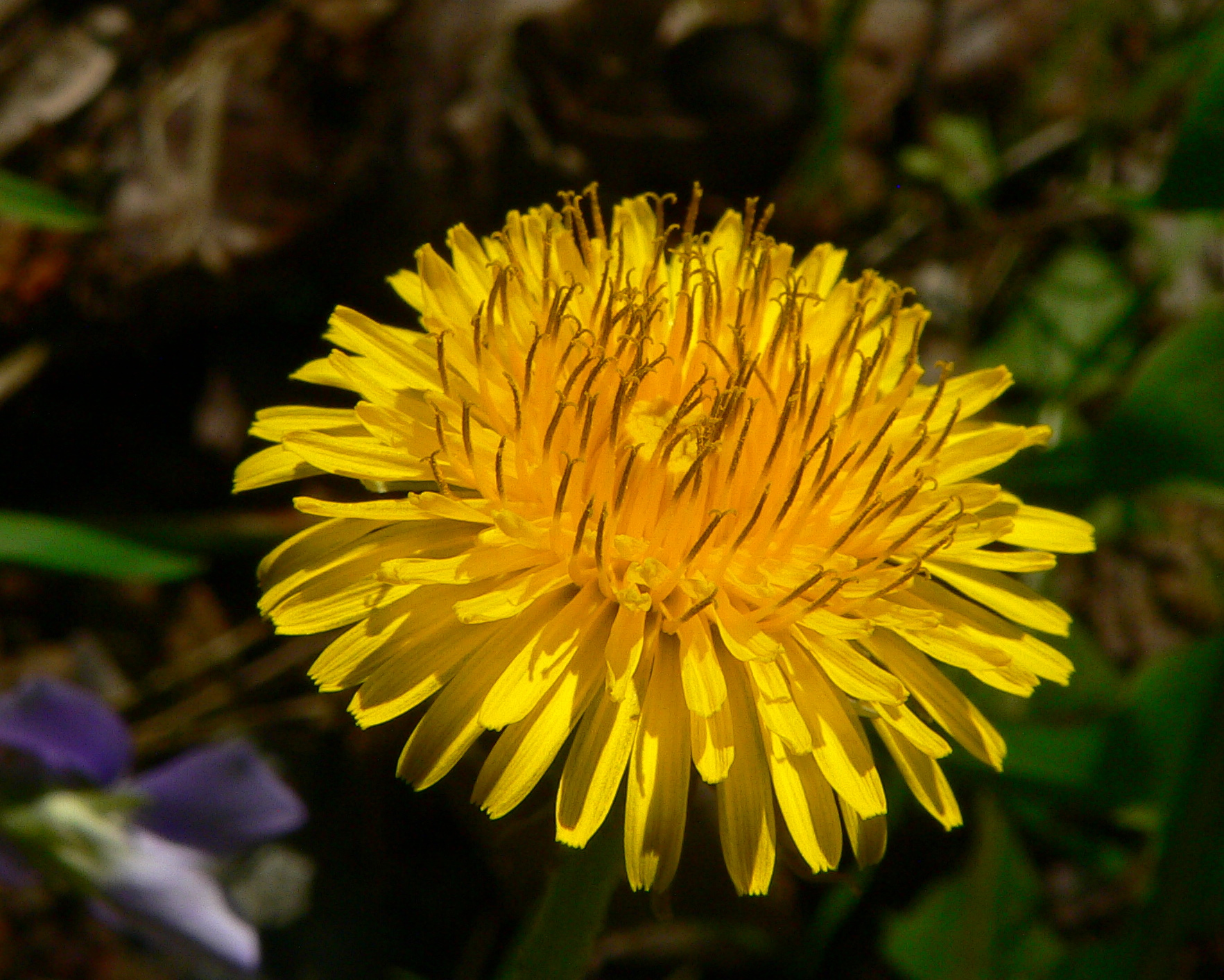
T. officinale

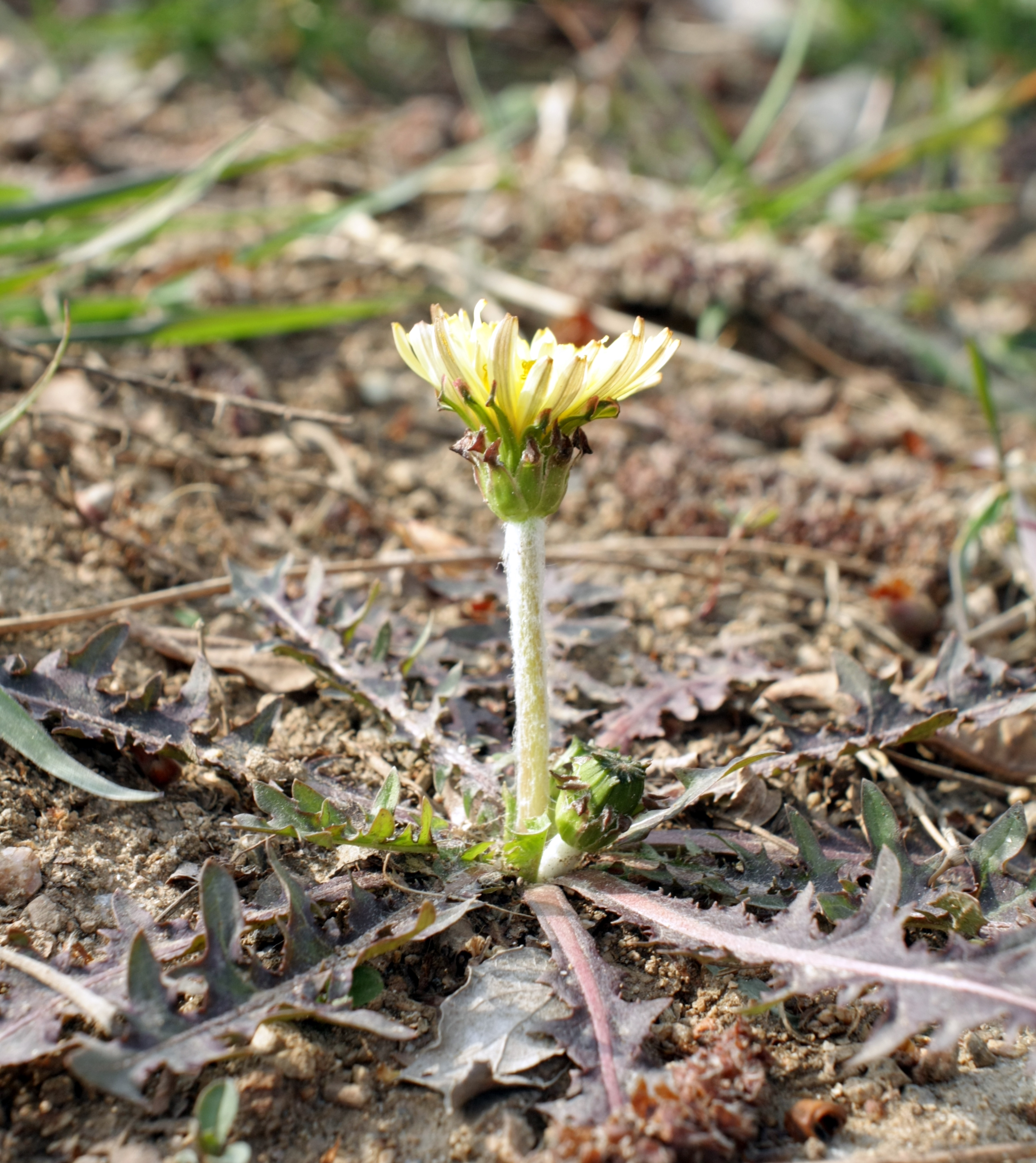
T. platycarpum

=== Cultivars ===
- 'Amélioré à Coeur Plein' yields an abundant crop with minimal ground space because its leaves clump rather than spreading out.
- 'Broad-leaved' - The leaves are thick and tender. It grows up to 60 mm (2') wide depending on the soil.
- 'Vert de Montmagny' is a large-leaved, vigorous grower, which matures early.

== History ==
Dandelions are thought to have evolved about 30 million years ago in Eurasia. Fossil seeds of Taraxacum tanaiticum have been recorded from the Pliocene of southern Belarus. Dandelions have been used by humans for food and as a herb for much of recorded history. They were well known to ancient Egyptians, Greeks and Romans, and are recorded to have been used in traditional Chinese medicine for over a thousand years. The plant was used as food and medicine by Native Americans. Dandelions were probably brought to North America on the Mayflower for their supposed medicinal benefits. Purposeful cultivation of dandelions seems to have begun in the United States in the early mid-19th century.

== Ecology ==
=== Food for wildlife ===
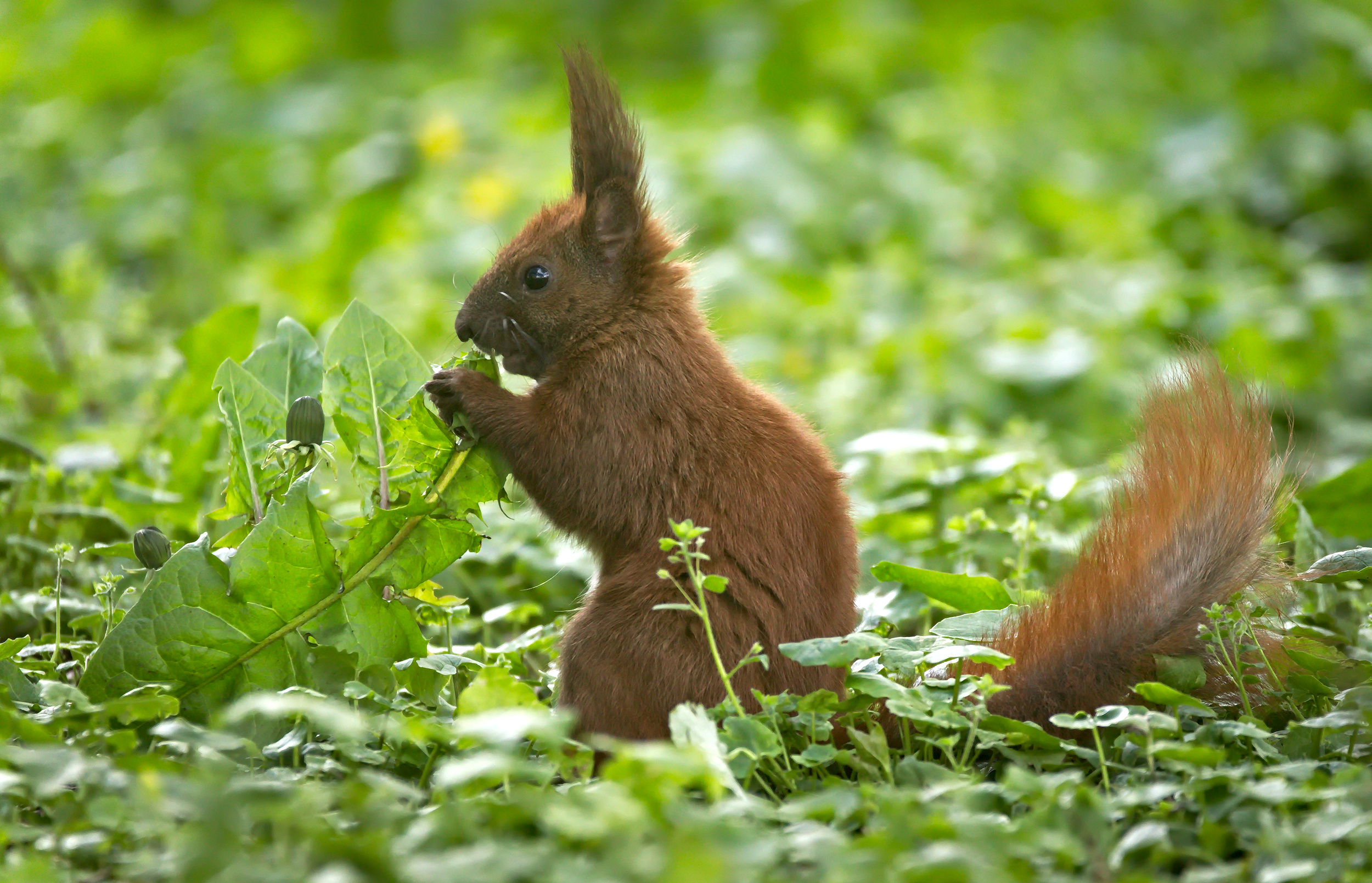
Red squirrel eating a common dandelion

Dandelions do not depend on wildlife for distribution or pollination; however much of wildlife benefits from the abundance of the plant. Rabbits, wild turkeys, white-tailed deer, eastern chipmunks, bobwhite quail, and many species of bird will consume the seeds and foliage. Additionally, many insects will collect nectar from the flower, especially in early spring when there are very few other flowers in bloom.

==== Seeds ====
Taraxacum seeds are an important food source for certain birds (linnets, Linaria spp.).

==== Nectar ====
Szabo studied nectar secretion in a dandelion patch over two years (59.2 and 8.9 flowers per square metre (5.50 and 0.83/sq ft) in 1981 and 1982). He measured average nectar volume at 7.4 μl/flower in 1981 and 3.7 μl/flower in 1982. The flowers tended to open in the morning and close in the afternoon with the concentrations significantly higher on the second day.

==== Leaves ====
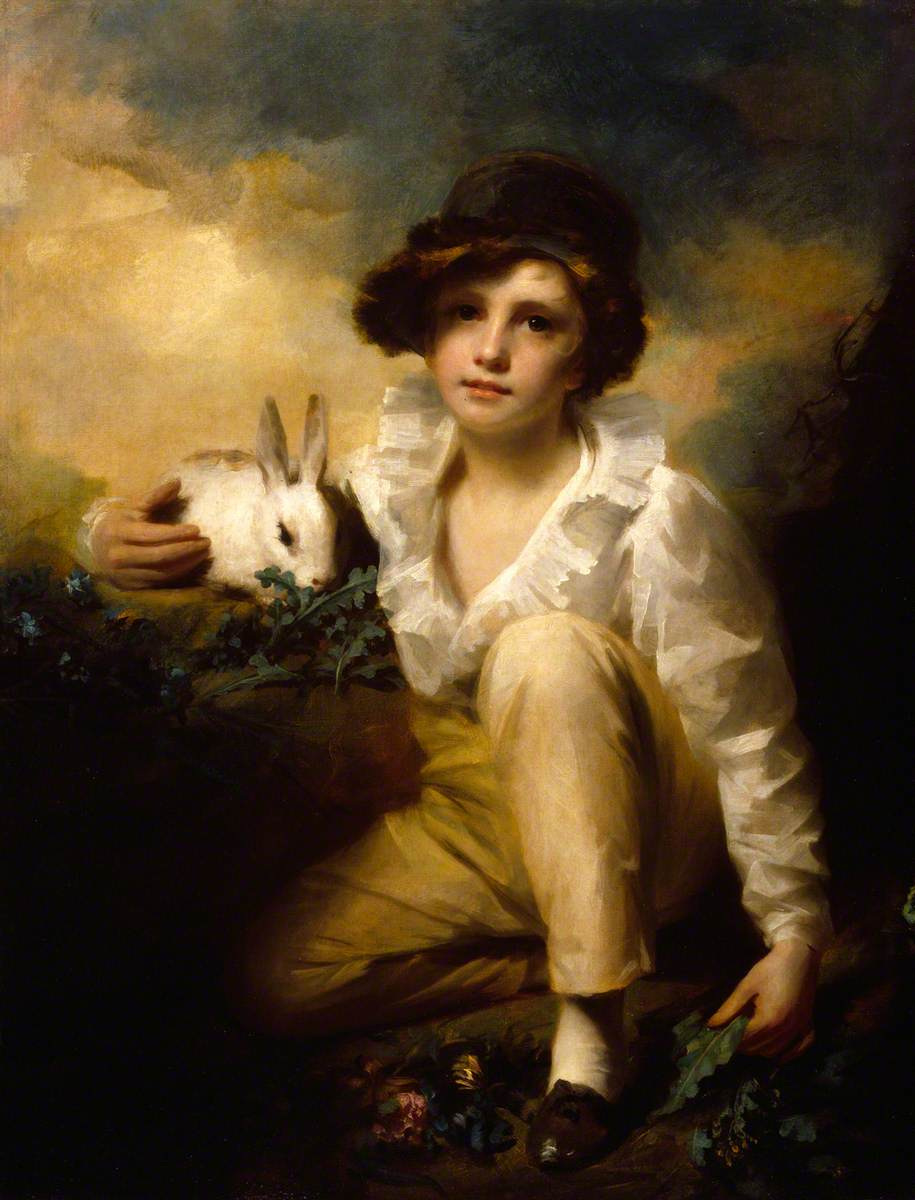
Boy and Rabbit by Henry Raeburn, 1814. The rabbit is shown eating dandelion leaves.

Insects eat the leaves of dandelions, especially species of Lepidoptera, which includes butterflies and moths. A study in Kargil, India, found that the most frequent insect visitors to dandelions were butterflies followed by species of Hymenoptera and Diptera.

=== As invasive species ===
Dandelions can cause significant economic damage as an invasive species and infestation of other crops worldwide. In Canada, the species T. officinale is listed as a noxious weed by Saskatchewan, Québec, and Manitoba. It can also be considered invasive in protected areas such as national parks. For example, Denali National Park and Preserve in Alaska lists Taraxacum officinale as the most common invasive species in the park and hosts an annual "Dandelion Demolition" event where volunteers are trained to remove the plant from the park's roadsides.

== Cultivation ==
=== In food ===
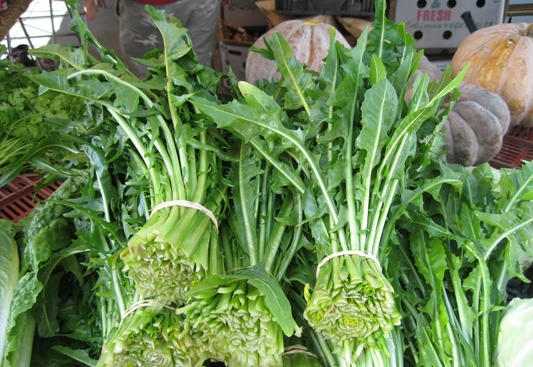
Bunches of dandelion greens at a farmer's market

The entire plant, including the leaves, stems, flowers, and roots, is edible and rich in nutrients such as calcium, iron, and vitamins A and K. Dandelions grow wild on every continent except Antarctica. Most commercial varieties are native to Eurasia. It is a perennial plant with a taproot, so the greens can be repeatedly harvested if the root remains in the ground. Raw dandelion greens contain high amounts of vitamins A, C, and K, and are moderate sources of calcium, potassium, iron, and manganese. Raw dandelion greens are 86% water, 9% carbohydrates, 3% protein, and 1% fat. A 100 gram (3 1/2oz) reference amount supplies 45 Calories.

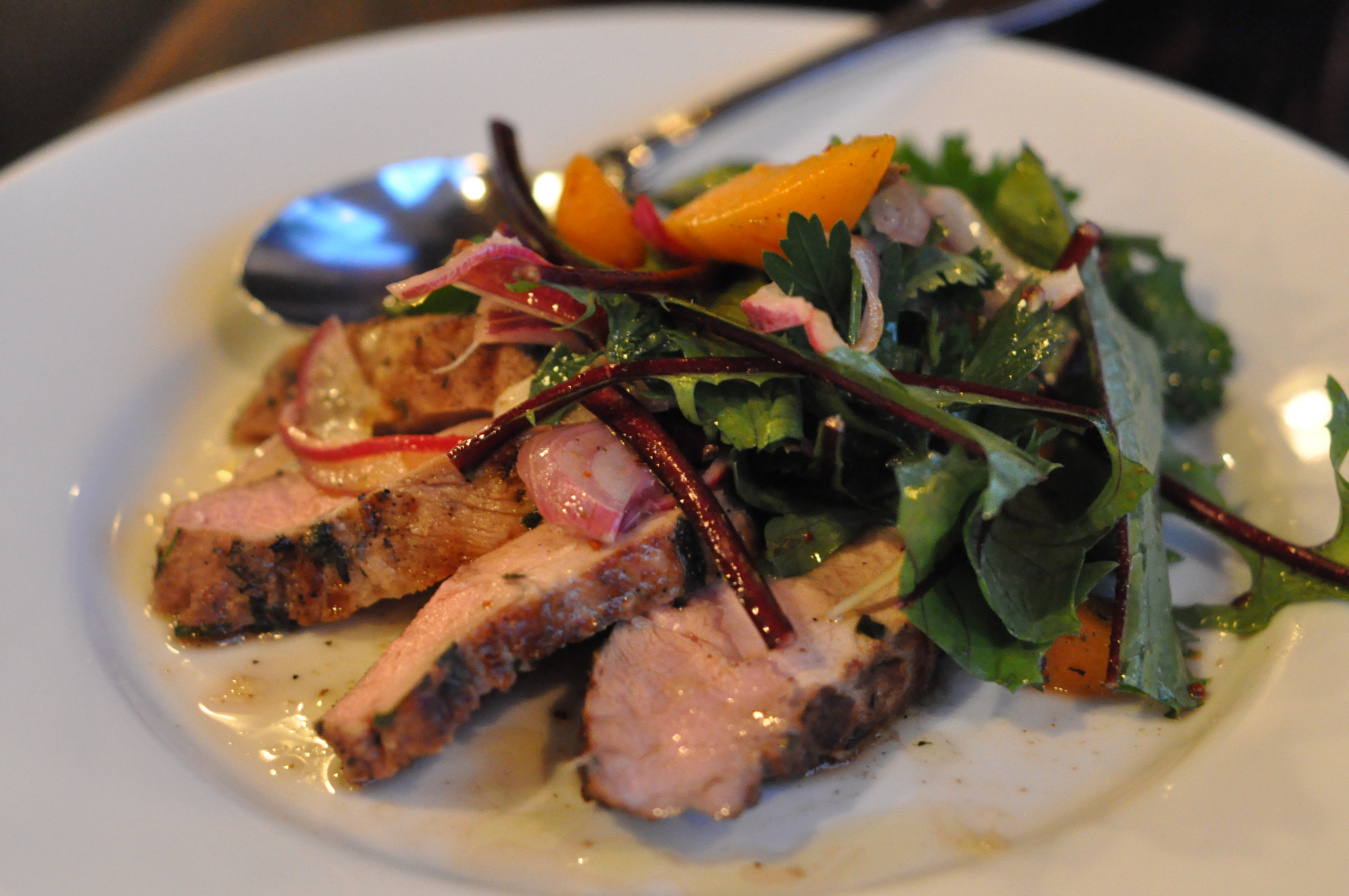
Dandelion greens with roasted pork and peaches

Dandelions contain bitter but water-soluble sesquiterpenes. The bitterness increases later in the season, after the flowers bloom, and as the leaves mature. To make dandelion greens more palatable, they can be blanched, picked young, served with other strong flavours, or some combination. In the Southern United States, they are traditionally served with a hot bacon dressing (similar to spinach salad). In Italy, the leaves are sauteed, added to soups, or added raw to salads. Dandelion greens have been a part of traditional Kashmiri cuisine, Lebanese cuisine, Spanish cuisine, Italian cuisine, Albanian cuisine, Slovenian, Sephardic Jewish, Chinese, Greek cuisine (χόρτα) and Korean cuisines. In Crete, the leaves of a variety called 'Mari' (Μαρί), 'Mariaki' (Μαριάκι), or 'Koproradiko' (Κοπροράδικο) are eaten by locals, either raw or boiled, in salads. T. megalorhizon, a species endemic to Crete, is eaten in the same way; it is found only at high altitudes (1,000–1,600 metres (3,300–5,200 ft)) and in fallow sites, and is called pentaramia (πενταράμια) or agrioradiko (αγριοράδικο).

The flower petals, along with other ingredients, usually including citrus, are used to make dandelion wine. Its ground, roasted roots can be used as a caffeine-free coffee alternative, as well as a flour substitute. Dandelion was also commonly used to make the traditional British soft drink dandelion and burdock, and is one of the ingredients of root beer.

=== Dye ===
The yellow flowers can be dried and ground into a yellow-pigmented powder and used as a dye.

=== Allergies ===
Dandelions may cause allergic reactions for sensitive individuals when consumed or coming into contact with skin, but the risk is mild. Latex containing sesquiterpene lactones are present in high concentrations in the main root and stems of the common dandelion. However, only a few researchers have mentioned the possible risk of mild allergic contact dermatitis for people with lactone hypersensitivity.

=== Herbalism ===
Dandelion has been used in traditional medicine in Europe, North America, and China. However, at this point, there is no clear scientific evidence of efficacy for any health condition. The root of the dandelion is a plentiful source of the fiber inulin, which encourages the movement of food in the digestive system.

=== Benefits to gardeners ===
With a wide range of uses, the dandelion is cultivated in sites ranging from small gardens to massive farms. It is kept as a companion plant; its taproot brings up nutrients for shallow-rooting plants. It is also known to attract pollinating insects and release ethylene gas, which helps fruit to ripen.

=== Cultural importance ===
It has been a Western tradition for someone to blow out a dandelion seed head and think of a wish they want to come true.

Five dandelion flowers are the emblem of White Sulphur Springs, West Virginia. The citizens celebrate spring with an annual Dandelion Festival.

The dandelion is the official flower of the University of Rochester in New York State, and "Dandelion Yellow" is one of the school's official colours. "The Dandelion Yellow" is an official University of Rochester song.

=== Inspiration for engineering ===
Because dandelion seeds can travel great distances on the wind, they have been studied as a basis for passive flight technologies. A 2003 study found that the wind blew over 99% of dandelion seeds just several meters from the plants, but 0.014% travelled over a kilometre away. The seeds can travel up to 100 kilometres (62 mi), the farthest known passive flight among plants. Scientists at the University of Edinburgh created prototype drones based on dandelion pappus in the 2010s. In 2018, researchers discovered how dandelion seeds create a separated vortex ring, a type of airflow. The geometry of their pappus affects fluid behaviours around the seed in a way that the researchers could duplicate in microfabricated silicone discs. In 2022, researchers at the University of Washington demonstrated battery-free wireless sensors and computers that mimic dandelion seeds and can float in the wind and disperse across a large area. In 2025, researchers at the New Mexico Institute of Mining and Technology developed dandelion-based drones that can power themselves from solar energy and vibrations.

=== As a source of natural rubber ===
Dandelions secrete latex when the tissues are cut or broken, yet in the wild type, the latex content is low and varies greatly. Taraxacum kok-saghyz, the Russian dandelion, is a species that produced industrially useful amounts during WW2. Using modern cultivation methods and optimisation techniques, scientists in the Fraunhofer Institute for Molecular Biology and Applied Ecology (IME) in Germany developed a cultivar of the Russian dandelion that is suitable for current commercial production of natural rubber. The latex produced exhibits the same quality as the natural rubber from rubber trees. In collaboration with Continental AG, IME is building a pilot facility. As of May 2014, the first prototype test tyres made with blends from dandelion-rubber are scheduled for testing on public roads over the next few years. In December 2017, Linglong Group Co. Ltd., a Chinese company, invested $450 million into making commercially viable rubber from dandelions.
