= Natural rubber =

Polymer harvested from certain trees

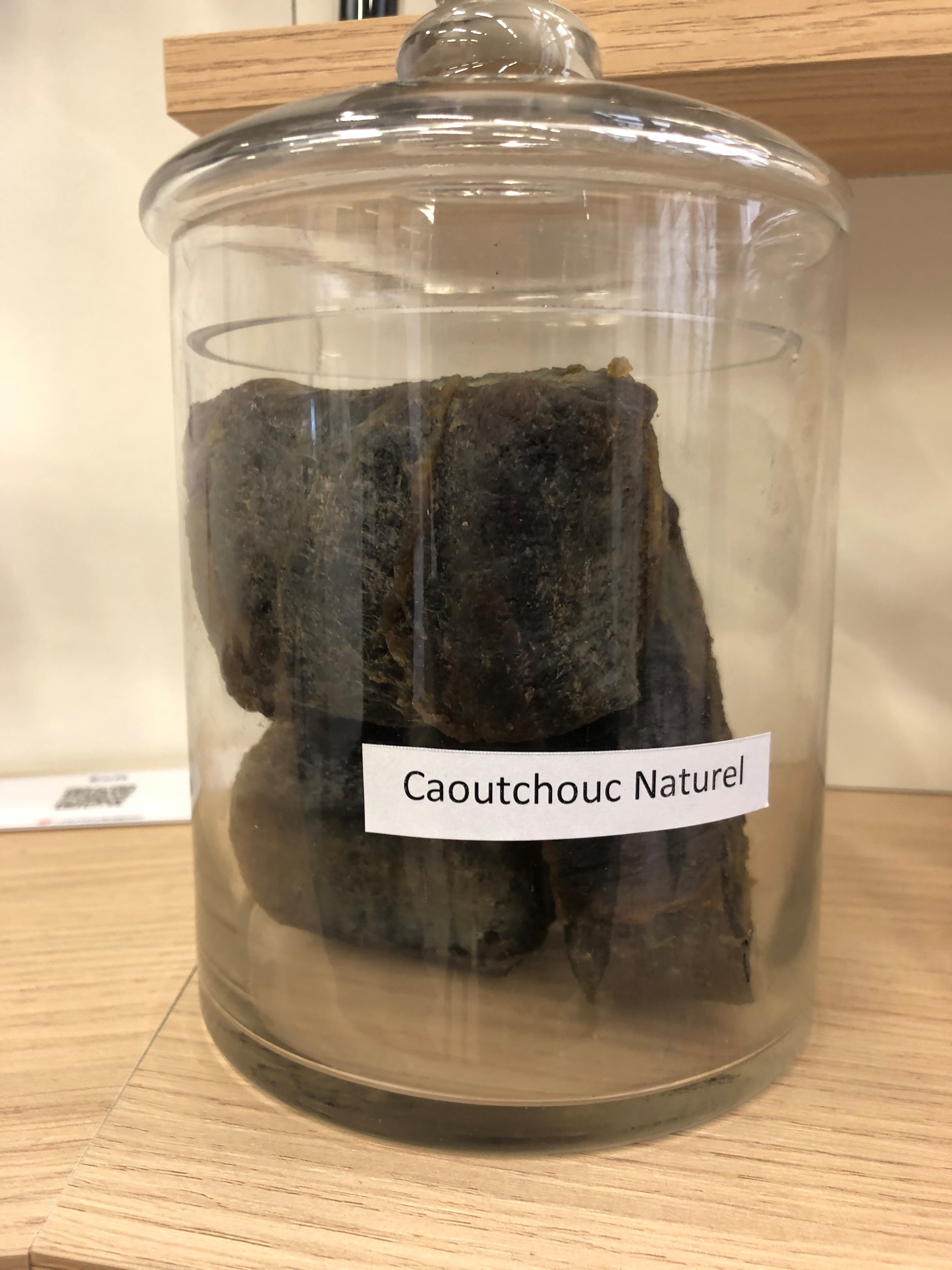
Pieces of natural vulcanized rubber at Hutchinson's Research and Innovation Center in France

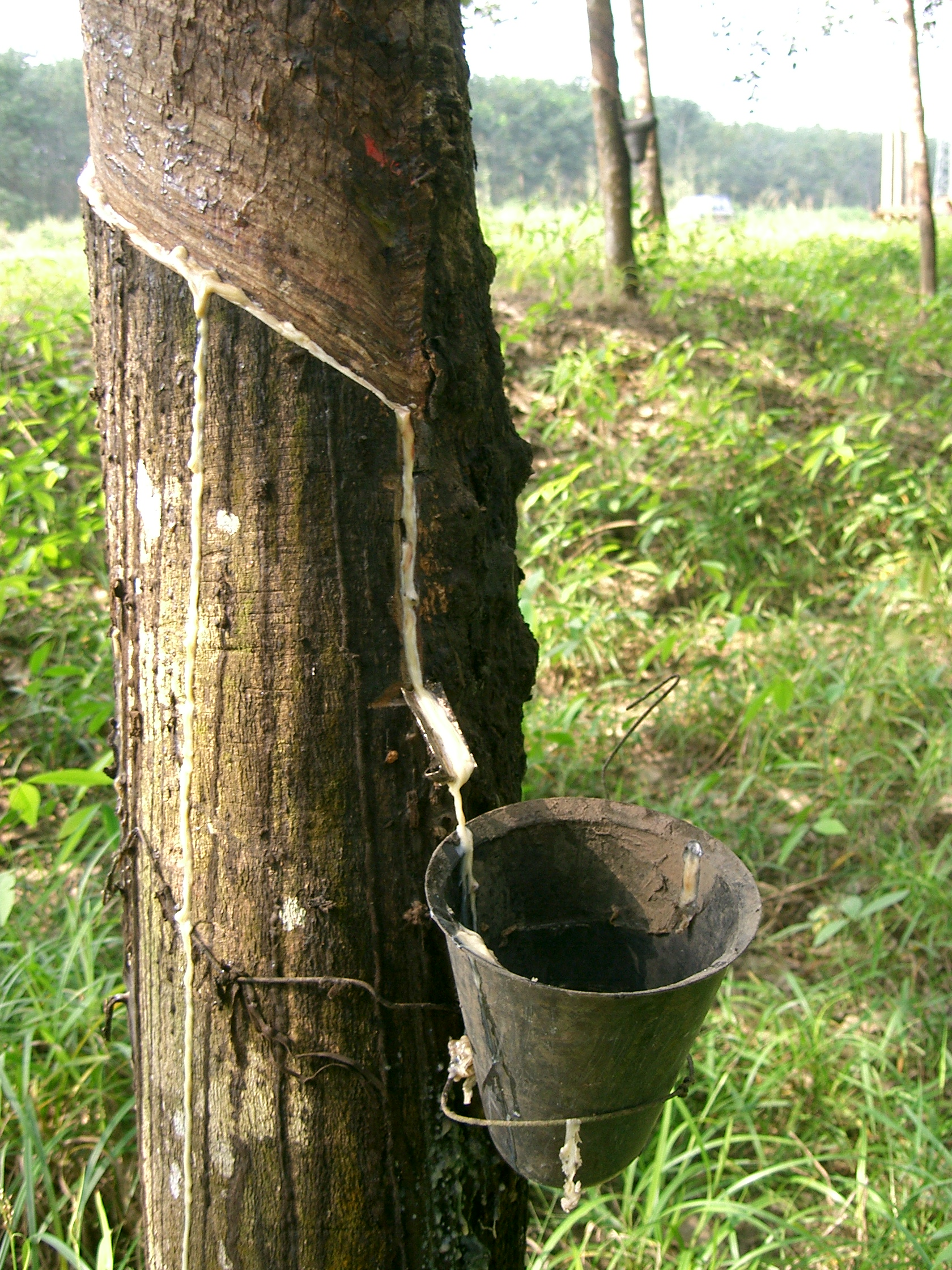
Latex being collected from a tapped rubber tree, Cameroon

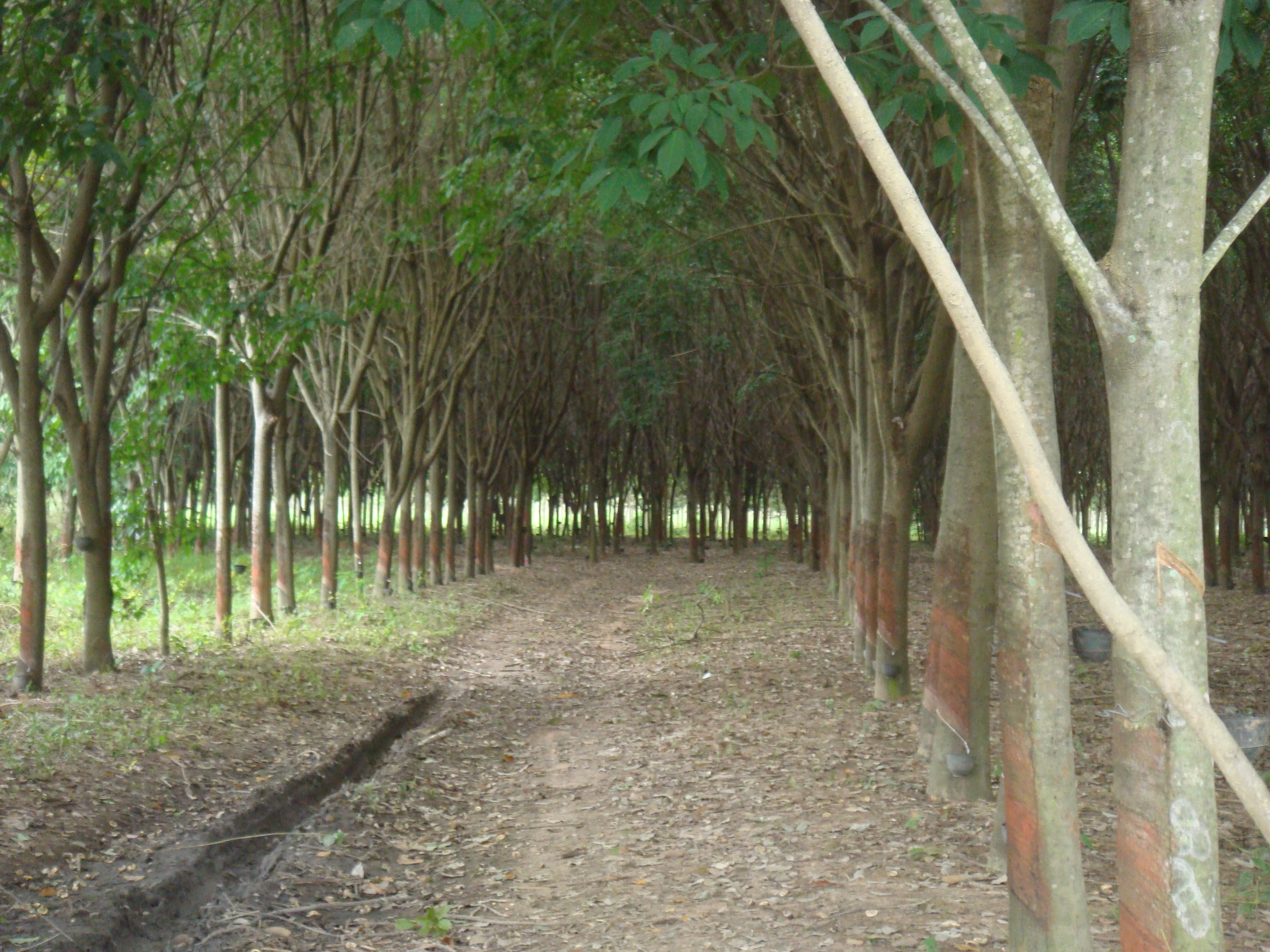
Rubber tree plantation in Thailand

Molecular structure of isoprene.

Rubber, also called India rubber, latex, Amazonian rubber, caucho, or caoutchouc, as initially produced, consists of polymers of the organic compound isoprene, with minor impurities of other organic compounds.

Types of polyisoprene that are used as natural rubbers are classified as elastomers. Currently, rubber is harvested mainly in the form of the latex from the Pará rubber tree (Hevea brasiliensis) or others. The latex is a sticky, milky and white colloid drawn off by making incisions in the bark and collecting the fluid in vessels in a process called "tapping". Manufacturers refine this latex into the rubber that is ready for commercial processing.

Natural rubber is used extensively in many applications and products, either alone or in combination with other materials. In most of its useful forms, it has a large stretch ratio and high resilience and also is buoyant and water-proof. Industrial demand for rubber-like materials began to outstrip natural rubber supplies by the end of the 19th century, leading to the synthesis of synthetic rubber in 1909 by chemical means. Thailand, Malaysia, Indonesia, and Cambodia are four of the leading rubber producers.

== Varieties ==
=== Amazonian rubber tree (Hevea brasiliensis) ===
The major commercial source of natural rubber latex is the Amazonian rubber tree (Hevea brasiliensis), a member of the spurge family, Euphorbiaceae. Once native to Brazil, the species is now pan-tropical. This species is preferred because it grows well under cultivation. A properly managed tree responds to wounding by producing more latex for several years.

=== Congo rubber (Landolphia owariensis and L. spp.) ===
Congo rubber, formerly a major source of rubber, which motivated the atrocities in the Congo Free State, came from vines in the genus Landolphia (L. kirkii, L. heudelotii, and L. owariensis).

=== Dandelion ===
Dandelion milk contains latex. The latex exhibits the same quality as the natural rubber from rubber trees. In the wild types of dandelion, latex content is low and varies greatly. In Nazi Germany, research projects tried to use dandelions as a base for rubber production, but failed. In 2013, by inhibiting one key enzyme and using modern cultivation methods and optimization techniques, scientists in the Fraunhofer Institute for Molecular Biology and Applied Ecology (IME) in Germany developed a cultivar of the Kazakh dandelion (Taraxacum kok-saghyz) that seems suitable for commercial production of natural rubber. In collaboration with Continental Tires, IME began a pilot facility.

=== Other ===
Many other plants produce forms of latex rich in isoprene polymers, though not all produce usable forms of polymer as easily as the Pará. Some of them require more elaborate processing to produce anything like usable rubber, and most are more difficult to tap. Some produce other desirable materials, for example gutta-percha (Palaquium gutta) and chicle from Manilkara species. Others that have been commercially exploited, or at least showed promise as rubber sources, include the rubber fig (Ficus elastica), Panama rubber tree (Castilla elastica), Micrandra minor (source of Caurá rubber), various spurges (Euphorbia spp.), lettuce (Lactuca species), the related Scorzonera tau-saghyz, various Taraxacum species, including common dandelion (Taraxacum officinale) and Kazakh dandelion, and, perhaps most important (for its hypoallergenic properties), guayule (Parthenium argentatum). The term gum rubber is sometimes applied to the tree-obtained version of natural rubber in order to distinguish it from the synthetic version.

== History ==
The first use of rubber was by the indigenous cultures of Mesoamerica. The earliest archeological evidence of the use of natural latex from the Hevea tree comes from the Olmec culture, in which rubber was first used for making balls for the Mesoamerican ballgame. Rubber was later used by the Maya and Aztec cultures: in addition to making balls, Aztecs used rubber for other purposes, such as making containers and making textiles waterproof by impregnating them with the latex sap.

Charles Marie de La Condamine is credited with introducing samples of rubber to the Académie Royale des Sciences of France in 1736, which he wrote as caoutchouc, from cahuchu in the language of the Manina people in Quito. In 1751, he presented a paper by François Fresneau to the Académie (published in 1755) that described many of rubber's properties. This has been referred to as the first scientific paper on rubber. In England, Joseph Priestley, in 1770, observed that a piece of the material was extremely good for rubbing off pencil marks on paper, hence the name "rubber". It slowly made its way around England. In 1764, François Fresnau discovered that turpentine was a rubber solvent. Giovanni Fabbroni is credited with the discovery of naphtha as a rubber solvent in 1779. Charles Macintosh also experimented with naphtha leading to his invention of waterproof rubberized fabric; the essence of his patent was the cementing of two thicknesses of cloth together with natural rubber. Charles Goodyear redeveloped vulcanization in 1839, although Mesoamericans had used stabilized rubber for balls and other objects as early as 1600 BC.

South America remained the main source of latex rubber used during much of the 19th century. The rubber trade was heavily controlled by business interests but no laws expressly prohibited the export of seeds or plants. In 1876, Henry Wickham smuggled 70,000 Amazonian rubber tree seeds from Brazil and delivered them to Kew Gardens, England. Only 2,400 of these germinated. Seedlings were then sent to India, British Ceylon (Sri Lanka), Dutch East Indies (Indonesia), Singapore, and British Malaya. Malaya (now Peninsular Malaysia) was later to become the biggest producer of rubber.

In the early 1900s, the Congo Free State in Africa was also a significant source of natural rubber latex, mostly gathered by forced labor. King Leopold II's colonial state brutally enforced production quotas due to the high price of natural rubber at the time. Tactics to enforce the rubber quotas included removing the hands of victims to prove they had been killed. Soldiers often came back from raids with baskets full of chopped-off hands. Villages that resisted were razed to encourage better compliance locally.

The rubber boom in the Amazon also similarly affected indigenous populations to varying degrees. Correrias, or slave raids were frequent in Colombia, Peru and Bolivia where many were either captured or killed. The best-known case of atrocities generated from rubber extraction in South America came from the Putumayo genocide. Between the 1880s and 1913, Julio César Arana and his company, which would become the Peruvian Amazon Company, controlled the Putumayo river. W. E. Hardenburg, Benjamin Saldaña Rocca and Roger Casement were influential figures in exposing these atrocities. Roger Casement was also prominent in revealing the Congo atrocities to the world. Days before entering Iquitos by boat Casement wrote "'Caoutchouc was first called 'india rubber,' because it came from the Indies, and the earliest European use of it was to rub out or erase. It is now called India rubber because it rubs out or erases the Indians."

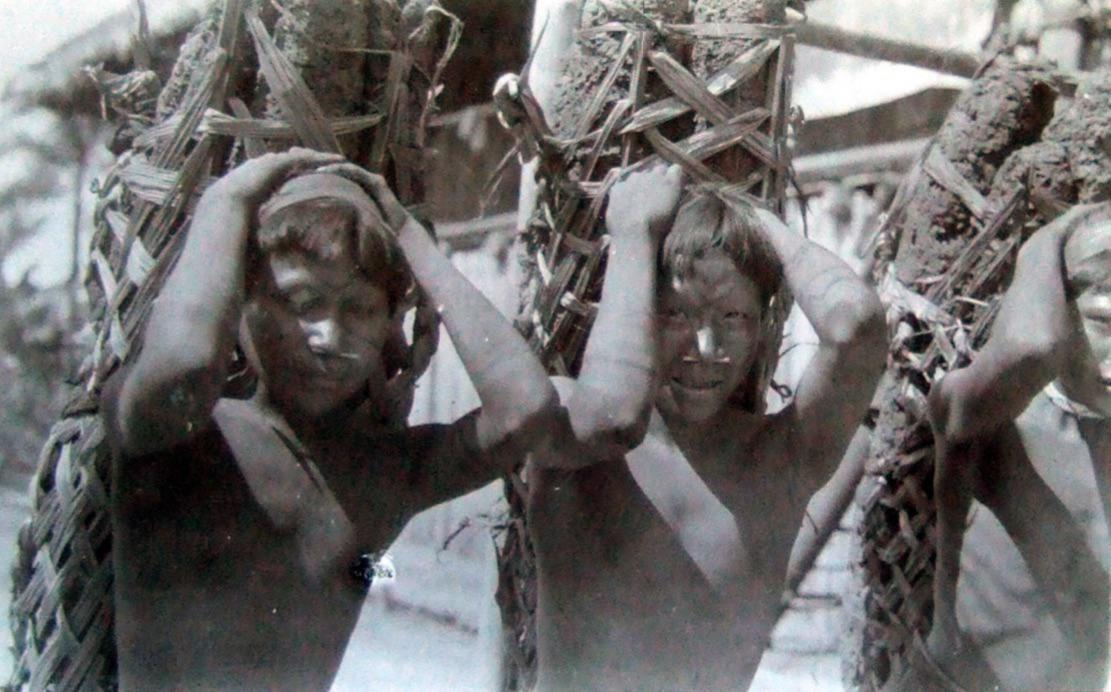
"Enslaved natives with a load of rubber weighing 75 kilos; they have journeyed 100 kilometers with no food given"

In India, commercial cultivation was introduced by British planters, although the experimental efforts to grow rubber on a commercial scale were initiated as early as 1873 at the Calcutta Botanical Garden. The first commercial Hevea plantations were established at Thattekadu in Kerala in 1902. In later years the plantation expanded to Karnataka, Tamil Nadu and the Andaman and Nicobar Islands of India. Today, India is the world's third-largest producer and fourth-largest consumer of rubber.

In Singapore and Malaya, commercial production was heavily promoted by Sir Henry Nicholas Ridley, who served as the first Scientific Director of the Singapore Botanic Gardens from 1888 to 1911. He distributed rubber seeds to many planters and developed the first technique for tapping trees for latex without causing serious harm to the tree. Because of his fervent promotion of this crop, he is popularly remembered by the nickname "Mad Ridley".

=== Pre–World War II ===
Before World War II significant uses included door and window profiles, hoses, belts, gaskets, matting, flooring, and dampeners (antivibration mounts) for the automotive industry. The use of rubber in car tires (initially solid rather than pneumatic) in particular consumed a significant amount of rubber. Gloves (medical, household, and industrial) and toy balloons were large consumers of rubber, although the type of rubber used is concentrated latex. Significant tonnage of rubber was used as adhesives in many manufacturing industries and products, although the two most noticeable were the paper and the carpet industries. Rubber was commonly used to make rubber bands and pencil erasers.

Rubber produced as a fiber, sometimes called 'elastic', had significant value to the textile industry because of its excellent elongation and recovery properties. For these purposes, manufactured rubber fiber was made as either an extruded round fiber or rectangular fibers cut into strips from extruded film. Because of its low dye acceptance, feel and appearance, the rubber fiber was either covered by yarn of another fiber or directly woven with other yarns into the fabric. Rubber yarns were used in foundation garments. While rubber is still used in textile manufacturing, its low tenacity limits its use in lightweight garments because latex lacks resistance to oxidizing agents and is damaged by aging, sunlight, oil and perspiration. The textile industry turned to neoprene (polymer of chloroprene), a type of synthetic rubber, as well as another more commonly used elastomer fiber, spandex (also known as elastane), because of their superiority to rubber in both strength and durability.

Plants like guayule and the Kazakh dandelion are being explored as alternative sources of natural rubber today.

=== World War II ===
From 1939 to 1941, Malaya was the world's largest supplier of rubber, producing enough to fully supply the industrial and military needs of the British Empire and all its allies, including the then still officially neutral United States. The entry of Imperial Japan into World War II in December 1941 and the rapid seizure of Malaya by Japanese forces in early 1942 cut off the Allied Powers from most of the global rubber supply, and Adolf Hitler rejoiced. The United States was cut off from almost its entire supply of natural rubber and entered a temporary rubber famine. As such, it sought to reduce its dependence on Malayan rubber by developing substantial synthetic rubber production. Following the Japanese conquest of Southeast Asia, Ceylon became the Allies' primary source of natural rubber.

== Properties ==
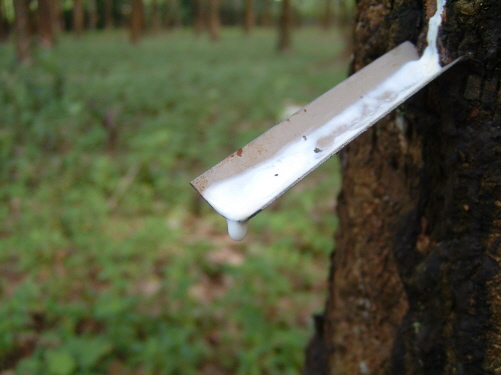
Rubber latex

Rubber exhibits unique physical and chemical properties. Rubber's stress–strain behavior exhibits the Mullins effect and the Payne effect and is often modeled as hyperelastic. Rubber strain crystallizes. Because there are weakened allylic C–H bonds in each repeat unit, natural rubber is susceptible to vulcanisation as well as being sensitive to ozone cracking. The two main solvents for rubber are turpentine and naphtha (petroleum). Because rubber does not dissolve easily, the material is finely divided by shredding prior to its immersion. An ammonia solution can be used to prevent the coagulation of raw latex. Rubber begins to melt at approximately 180 °C (356 °F).

=== Elasticity ===
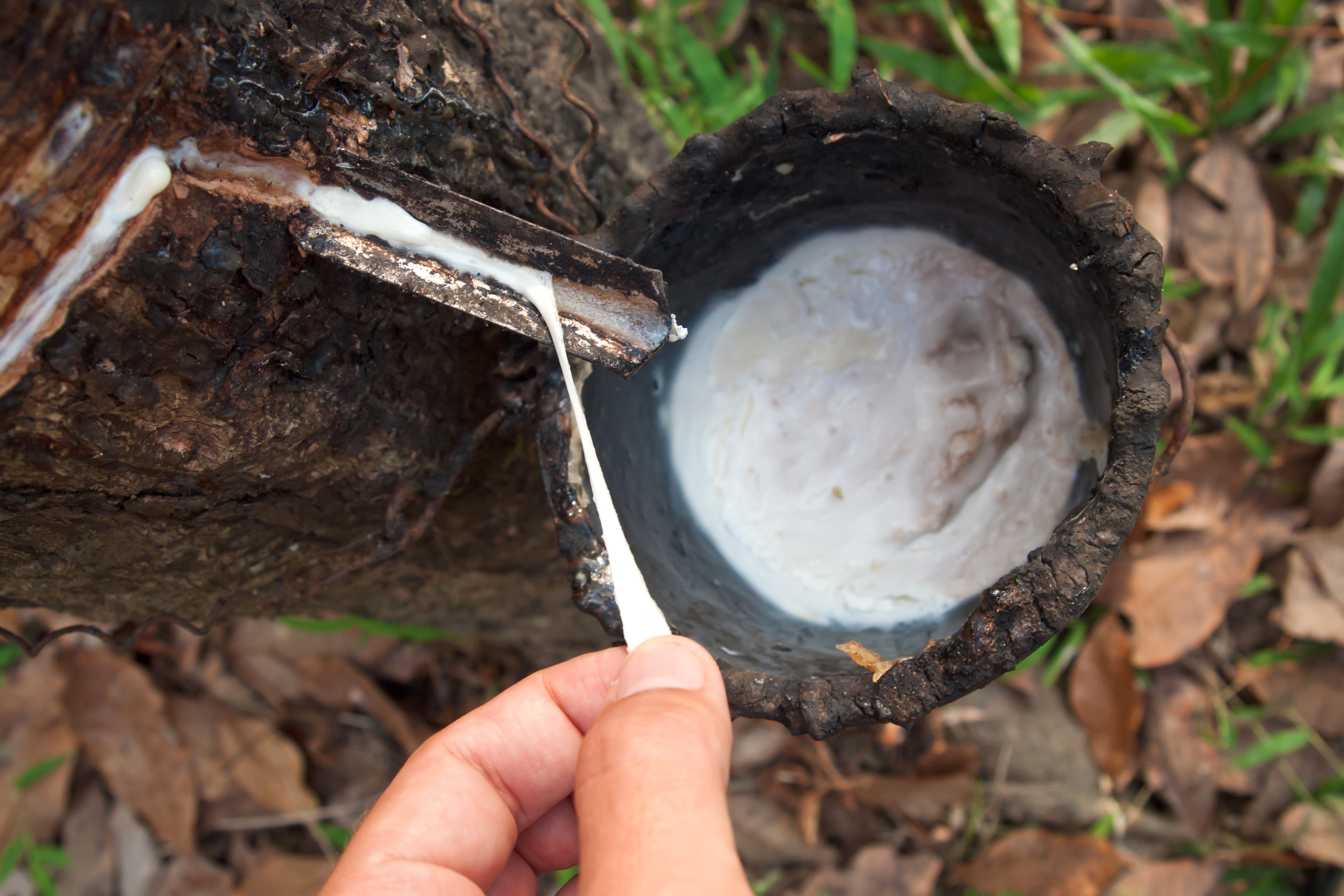
Rubber latex elasticity

On a microscopic scale, relaxed rubber is a disorganized cluster of erratically changing wrinkled chains. In stretched rubber, the chains are almost linear. The restoring force is due to the preponderance of wrinkled conformations over more linear ones.

Cooling below the glass transition temperature permits local conformational changes but a reordering is practically impossible because of the larger energy barrier for the concerted movement of longer chains. "Frozen" rubber's elasticity is low and strain results from small changes of bond lengths and angles: this caused the Challenger disaster, when the American Space Shuttle's flattened o-rings failed to relax to fill a widening gap. The glass transition is fast and reversible: the force resumes on heating.

The parallel chains of stretched rubber are susceptible to crystallization. This takes some time because turns of twisted chains have to move out of the way of the growing crystallites. Crystallization has occurred, for example, when, after days, an inflated toy balloon is found withered at a relatively large remaining volume. Where it is touched, it shrinks because the temperature of the hand is enough to melt the crystals.

Vulcanization of rubber creates di- and polysulfide bonds between chains, which limits the degrees of freedom and results in chains that tighten more quickly for a given strain, thereby increasing the elastic force constant and making the rubber harder and less extensible.

=== Malodour ===
Raw rubber storage depots and rubber processing can produce malodour that is serious enough to become a source of complaints and protest to those who live in its vicinity. Microbial impurities originate during the processing of block rubber. These impurities break down during storage or thermal degradation and produce volatile organic compounds. Examination of these compounds using gas chromatography/mass spectrometry (GC/MS) and gas chromatography (GC) indicates that they contain sulfur, ammonia, alkenes, ketones, esters, hydrogen sulfide, nitrogen, and low-molecular-weight fatty acids (C2–C5). When latex concentrate is produced from rubber, sulfuric acid is used for coagulation. This produces malodourous hydrogen sulfide. The industry can mitigate these bad odours with scrubber systems.

== Chemical makeup ==
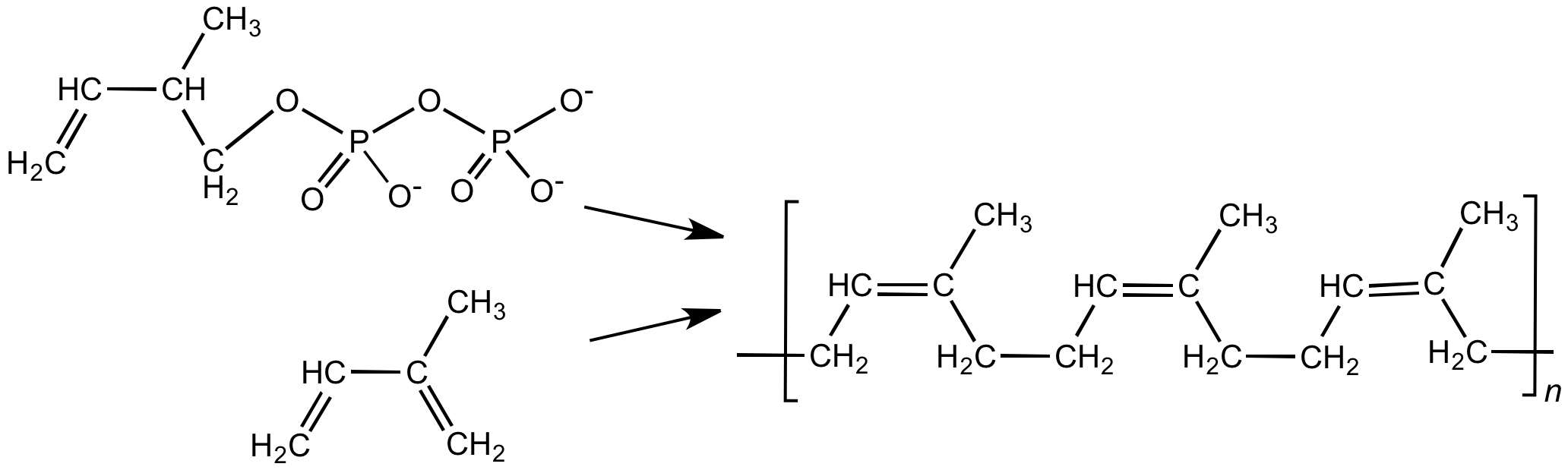
Chemical structure of cis-polyisoprene, the main constituent of natural rubber. Synthetic cis-polyisoprene and natural cis-polyisoprene are derived from distinct precursors, isopentenyl pyrophosphate and isoprene.

Rubber is the polymer cis-1,4-polyisoprene—with a molecular weight of 100,000 to 1,000,000 daltons. Typically, a small percentage (up to 5% of dry mass) of other materials, such as proteins, fatty acids, resins, and inorganic materials (salts) are found in natural rubber. Polyisoprene can also be created synthetically, producing what is sometimes referred to as "synthetic natural rubber", but the synthetic and natural routes are distinct. Some natural rubber sources, such as gutta-percha, are composed of trans-1,4-polyisoprene, a structural isomer that has similar properties. Natural rubber is an elastomer and a thermoplastic. Once the rubber is vulcanized, it is a thermoset. Most rubber in everyday use is vulcanized to a point where it shares properties of both; i.e., if it is heated and cooled, it is degraded but not destroyed. The final properties of a rubber item depend not just on the polymer, but also on modifiers and fillers, such as carbon black, factice, whiting and others.

=== Biosynthesis ===
Rubber particles are formed in the cytoplasm of specialized latex-producing cells called laticifers within rubber plants. Rubber particles are surrounded by a single phospholipid membrane with hydrophobic tails pointed inward. The membrane allows biosynthetic proteins to be sequestered at the surface of the growing rubber particle, which allows new monomeric units to be added from outside the biomembrane, but within the lacticifer. The rubber particle is an enzymatically active entity that contains three layers of material, the rubber particle, a biomembrane and free monomeric units. The biomembrane is held tightly to the rubber core by the high negative charge along the double bonds of the rubber polymer backbone. Free monomeric units and conjugated proteins make up the outer layer. The rubber precursor is isopentenyl pyrophosphate (an allylic compound), which elongates by Mg^{2+}-dependent condensation by the action of rubber transferase. The monomer adds to the pyrophosphate end of the growing polymer. The process displaces the terminal high-energy pyrophosphate. The reaction produces a cis polymer. The initiation step is catalyzed by prenyltransferase, which converts three monomers of isopentenyl pyrophosphate into farnesyl pyrophosphate. The farnesyl pyrophosphate can bind to rubber transferase to elongate a new rubber polymer.

The required isopentenyl pyrophosphate is obtained from the mevalonate pathway, which derives from acetyl-CoA in the cytosol. In plants, isoprene pyrophosphate can also be obtained from the 1-deox-D-xyulose-5-phosphate/2-C-methyl-D-erythritol-4-phosphate pathway within plasmids. The relative ratio of the farnesyl pyrophosphate initiator unit and isoprenyl pyrophosphate elongation monomer determines the rate of new particle synthesis versus elongation of existing particles. Though rubber is known to be produced by only one enzyme, extracts of latex host numerous small molecular weight proteins with unknown function. The proteins possibly serve as cofactors, as the synthetic rate decreases with complete removal.

== Production ==
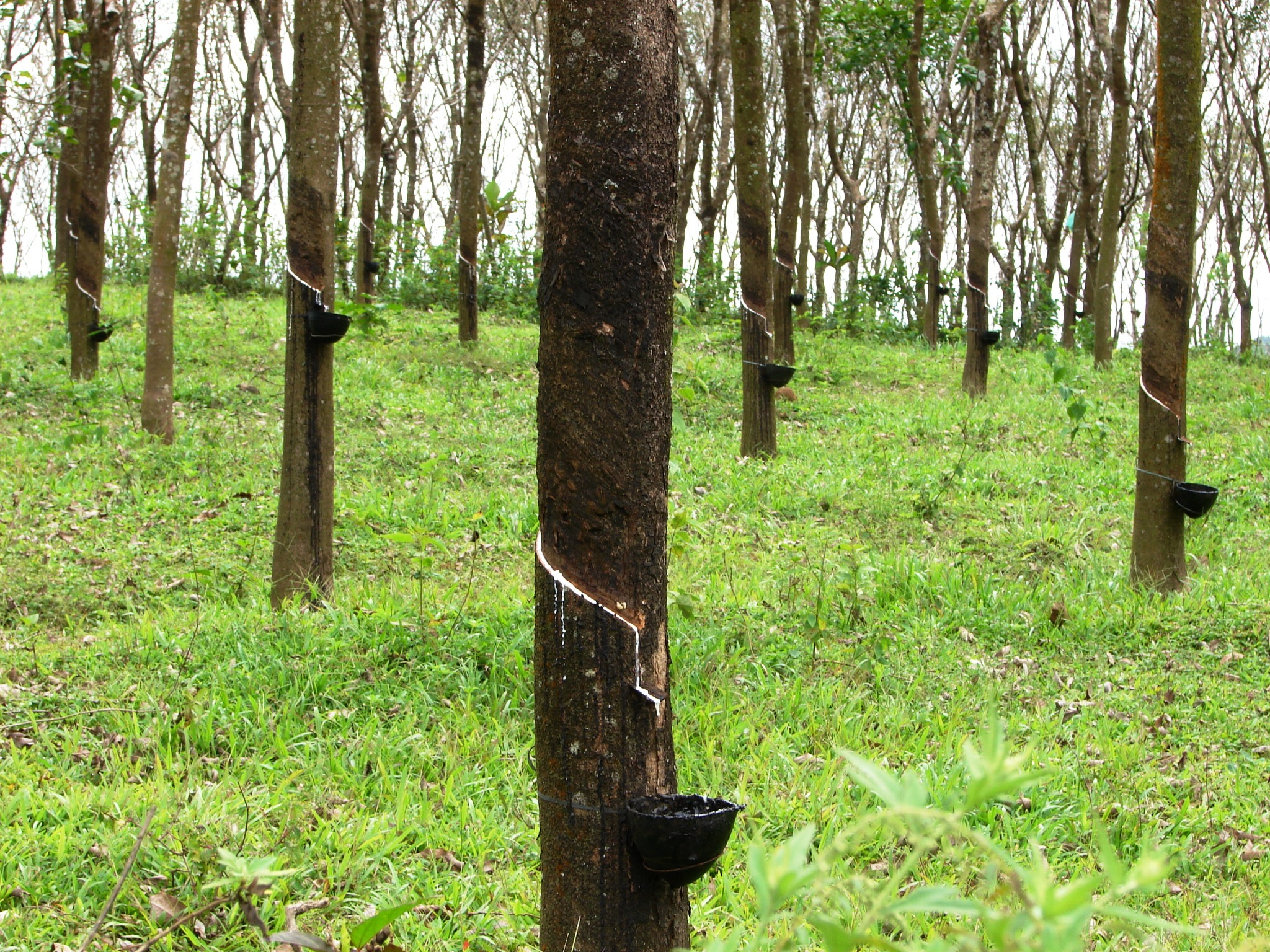
Rubber is generally cultivated in large plantations. The image shows a coconut shell used in collecting latex, in plantations in Kerala, India.

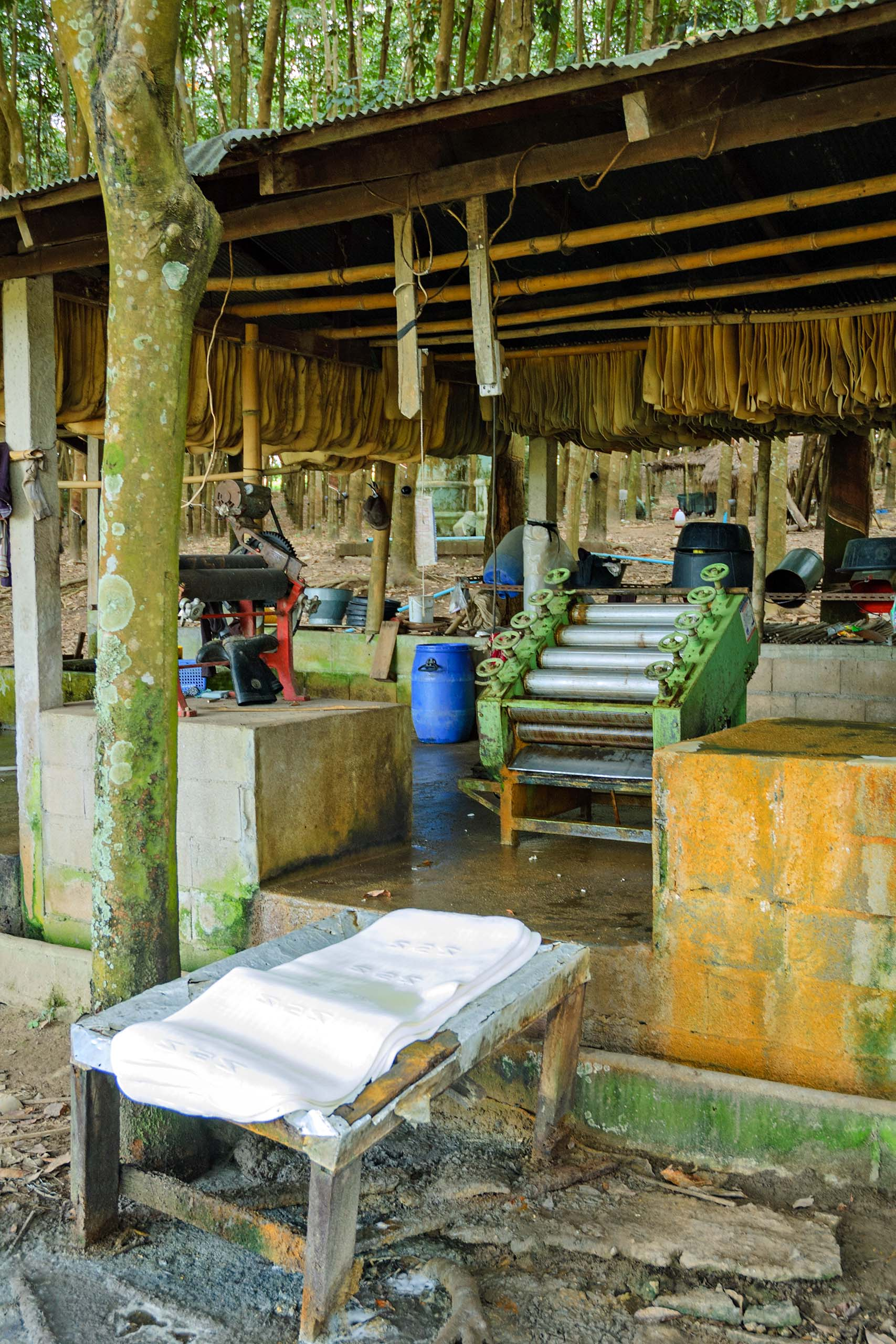
Natural rubber plantation press with raw latex sheets, Chiang Saen, Thailand

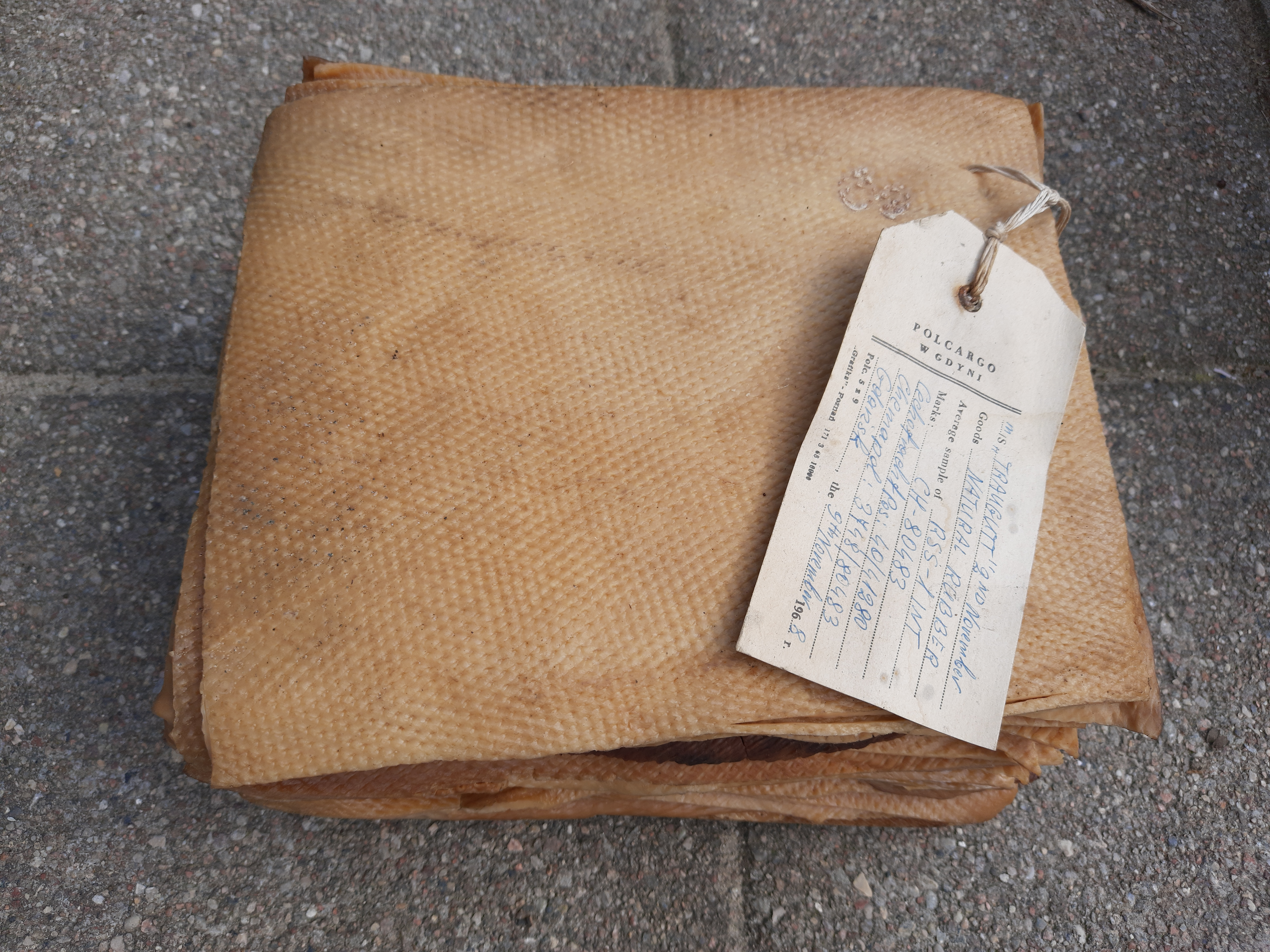
Sheets of natural rubber

More than 29 million metric tonnes of rubber were produced in 2022, of which over 50% was natural (15.1 million tonnes). Since the remainder is synthetic, which is derived from petroleum, the price of natural rubber is determined, to a large extent, by the prevailing global price of crude oil. Asia was the main source of natural rubber, accounting for about 90% of output in 2021. The three largest producers, Thailand, Indonesia, and Vietnam, together accounted for around 61% of all natural rubber production in 2022.

Natural rubber is not cultivated widely in its native continent of South America because of the South American leaf blight, and other natural predators there.

=== Cultivation ===
Rubber latex is extracted from rubber trees. The economic life of rubber trees in plantations is around 32 years, with up to 7 years being an immature phase and about 25 years of productive phase.

The soil requirement is well-drained, weathered soil consisting of laterite, lateritic types, sedimentary types, nonlateritic red or alluvial soils.

The climatic conditions for optimum growth of rubber trees are:

- Rainfall of around 250 centimetres (98 in) evenly distributed without any marked dry season and with at least 100 rainy days per year
- Temperature range of about 20 to 34 °C (68 to 93 °F), with a monthly mean of 25 to 28 °C (77 to 82 °F)
- Atmospheric humidity of around 80%
- About 2,000 hours sunshine per year at the rate of six hours per day throughout the year
- Absence of strong winds

Many high-yielding clones have been developed for commercial planting. These clones yield more than 2,000 kilograms per hectare (1,800 lb/acre) of dry rubber per year, under ideal conditions.

Rubber production has been linked to deforestation. Rubber therefore is one of seven commodities included in the 2023 EU Regulation on Deforestation-free products (EUDR), which aims to guarantee that the products European Union (EU) citizens consume do not contribute to deforestation or forest degradation worldwide.

=== Collection ===
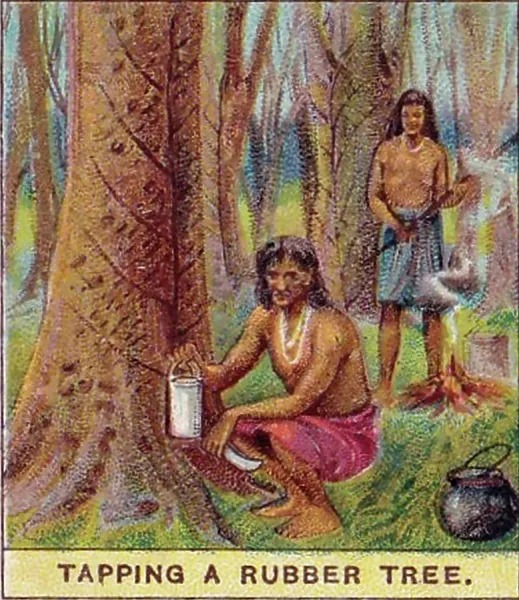
Vintage tobacco card, Tapping a Rubber Tree, India, Products of the World series, Player's Cigarettes, 1909

In places such as Kerala and Sri Lanka, where coconuts are in abundance, the half shell of coconut was used as the latex collection container. Glazed pottery or aluminium or plastic cups became more common in Kerala-India and other countries. The cups are supported by a wire that encircles the tree. This wire incorporates a spring so it can stretch as the tree grows. The latex is led into the cup by a galvanised "spout" knocked into the bark. Rubber tapping normally takes place early in the morning, when the internal pressure of the tree is highest. A good tapper can tap a tree every 20 seconds on a standard half-spiral system, and a common daily "task" size is between 450 and 650 trees. Trees are usually tapped on alternate or third days, although many variations in timing, length and number of cuts are used. "Tappers would make a slash in the bark with a small hatchet. These slanting cuts allowed latex to flow from ducts located on the exterior or the inner layer of the bark (cambium) of the tree. Since the cambium controls the growth of the tree, growth stops if it is cut. Thus, rubber tapping demanded accuracy, so that the incisions would not be too many given the size of the tree, or too deep, which could stunt its growth or kill it."

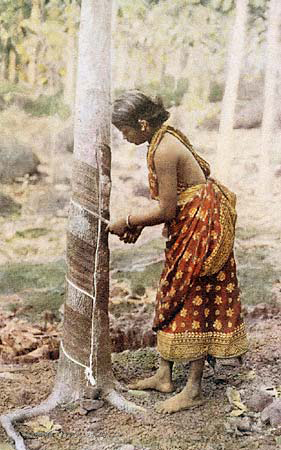
A woman in Sri Lanka harvesting rubber, c. 1920

It is common to tap a rubber tree at least twice, and sometimes three times, during its lifetime. The tree's economic lifespan depends on how efficiently the tapping is performed, as bark consumption is the critical factor. In Malaysia, the standard bark consumption for alternate daily tapping is 25 cm vertically per year.

The latex-bearing tubes in the bark spiral upward to the right, so tapping cuts are usually made upward to the left in order to intersect more tubes. The trees release latex for about four hours before the flow stops as the latex naturally coagulates on the tapping cut, blocking the tubes in the bark. Tappers typically rest and eat after completing their tapping work, and begin collecting the liquid "field latex" around midday.

==== Field coagula ====
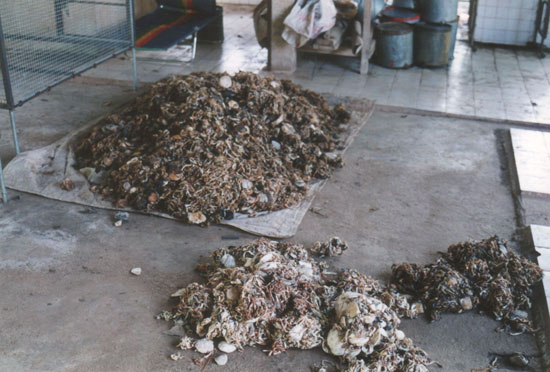
Mixed field coagula

The four types of field coagula are "cuplump", "treelace", "smallholders' lump", and "earth scrap". Each has significantly different properties. Some trees continue to drip after the collection leading to a small amount of "cup lump" that is collected at the next tapping. The latex that coagulates on the cut is also collected as "tree lace". Tree lace and cup lump together account for 10%–20% of the dry rubber produced. Latex that drips onto the ground, "earth scrap", is also collected periodically for processing of low-grade product.

===== Cup lump =====
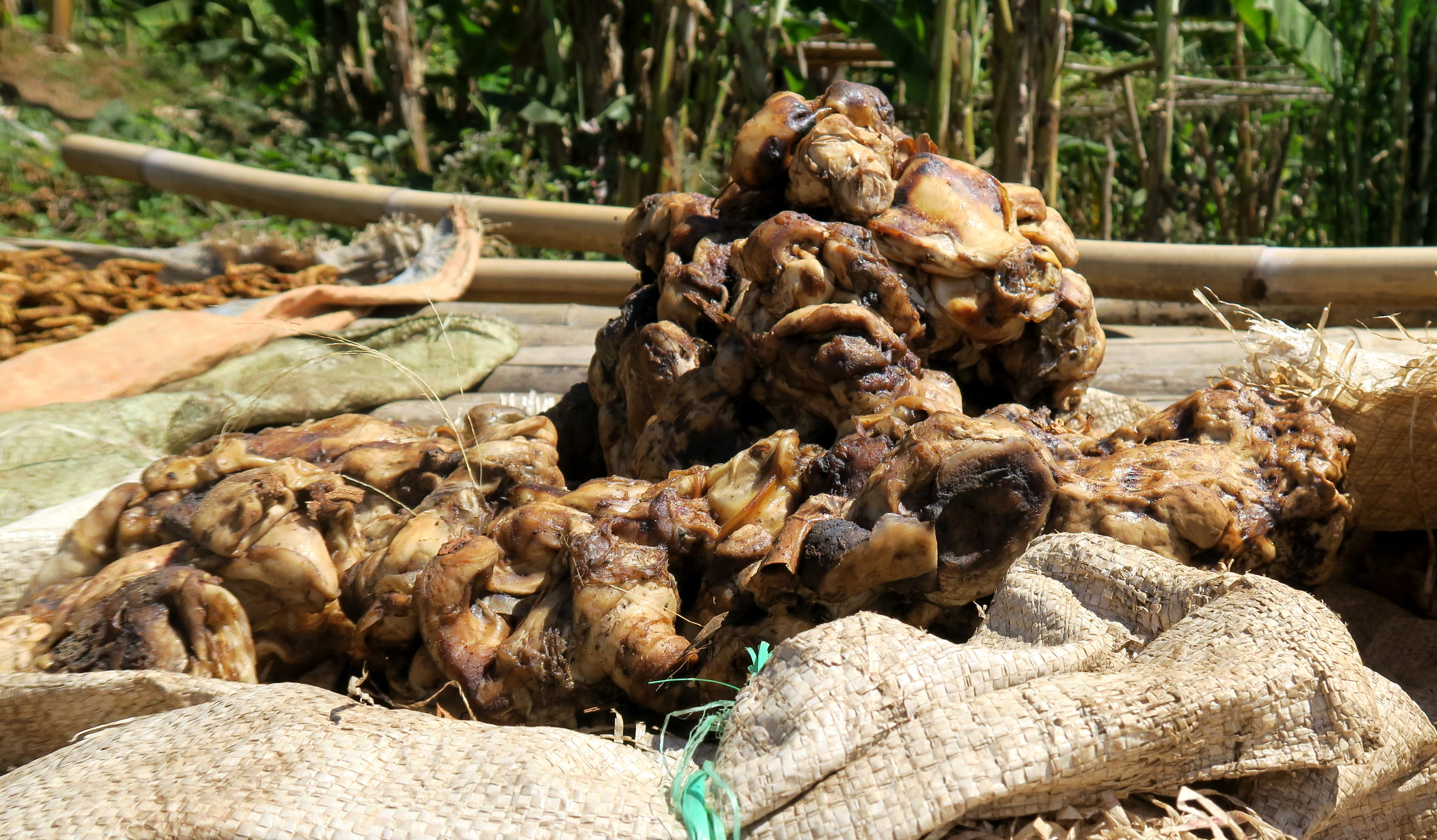
Cup lump rubber coagula in a Myanmar road stall

Cup lump is the coagulated material found in the collection cup when the tapper next visits the tree to tap it again. It arises from latex clinging to the walls of the cup after the latex was last poured into the bucket, and from late-dripping latex exuded before the latex-carrying vessels of the tree become blocked. It is of higher purity and of greater value than the other three types.

'Cup lumps' can also be used to describe a completely different type of coagulate that has collected in smallholder plantations over a period of 1–2 weeks. After tapping all of the trees, the tapper will return to each tree and stir in some type of acid, which allows the newly harvested latex to mix with the previously coagulated material. The rubber/acid mixture is what gives rubber plantations, markets, and factories a strong odor.

===== Tree lace =====
Tree lace is the coagulum strip that the tapper peels off the previous cut before making a new cut. It usually has higher copper and manganese contents than cup lump. Both copper and manganese are pro-oxidants and can damage the physical properties of the dry rubber.

===== Smallholders' lump =====
Smallholders' lump is produced by smallholders, who collect rubber from trees far from the nearest factory. Many Indonesian smallholders, who farm paddies in remote areas, tap dispersed trees on their way to work in the paddy fields and collect the latex (or the coagulated latex) on their way home. As it is often impossible to preserve the latex sufficiently to get it to a factory that processes latex in time for it to be used to make high quality products, and as the latex would anyway have coagulated by the time it reached the factory, the smallholder will coagulate it by any means available, in any container available. Some smallholders use small containers, buckets etc., but often the latex is coagulated in holes in the ground, which are usually lined with plastic sheeting. Acidic materials and fermented fruit juices are used to coagulate the latex – a form of assisted biological coagulation. Little care is taken to exclude twigs, leaves, and even bark from the lumps that are formed, which may also include tree lace.

===== Earth scrap =====
Earth scrap is material that gathers around the base of the tree. It arises from latex overflowing from the cut and running down the bark, from rain flooding a collection cup containing latex, and from spillage from tappers' buckets during collection. It contains soil and other contaminants, and has variable rubber content, depending on the amount of contaminants. Earth scrap is collected by field workers two or three times a year and may be cleaned in a scrap-washer to recover the rubber, or sold to a contractor who cleans it and recovers the rubber. It is of low quality.

=== Processing ===
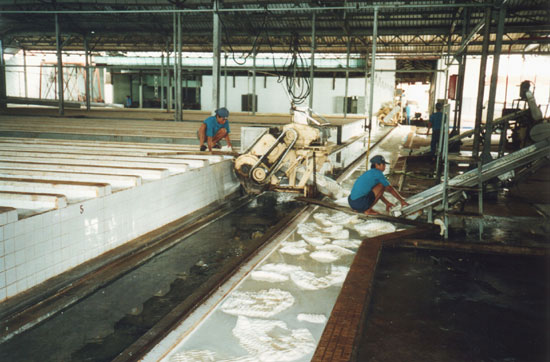
Removing coagulum from coagulating troughs

Latex coagulates in the cups if kept for long and must be collected before this happens. The collected latex, "field latex", is transferred into coagulation tanks for the preparation of dry rubber or transferred into air-tight containers with sieving for ammoniation. Ammoniation, invented by patent lawyer and vice-president of the United States Rubber Company Ernest Hopkinson around 1920, preserves the latex in a colloidal state for longer periods of time. Latex is generally processed into either latex concentrate for manufacture of dipped goods or coagulated under controlled, clean conditions using formic acid. The coagulated latex can then be processed into the higher-grade, technically specified block rubbers such as SVR 3L or SVR CV or used to produce Ribbed Smoke Sheet grades. Naturally coagulated rubber (cup lump) is used in the manufacture of TSR10 and TSR20 grade rubbers. Processing for these grades is a size reduction and cleaning process to remove contamination and prepare the material for the final stage of drying.

The dried material is then baled and palletized for storage and shipment.

=== Vulcanized rubber ===
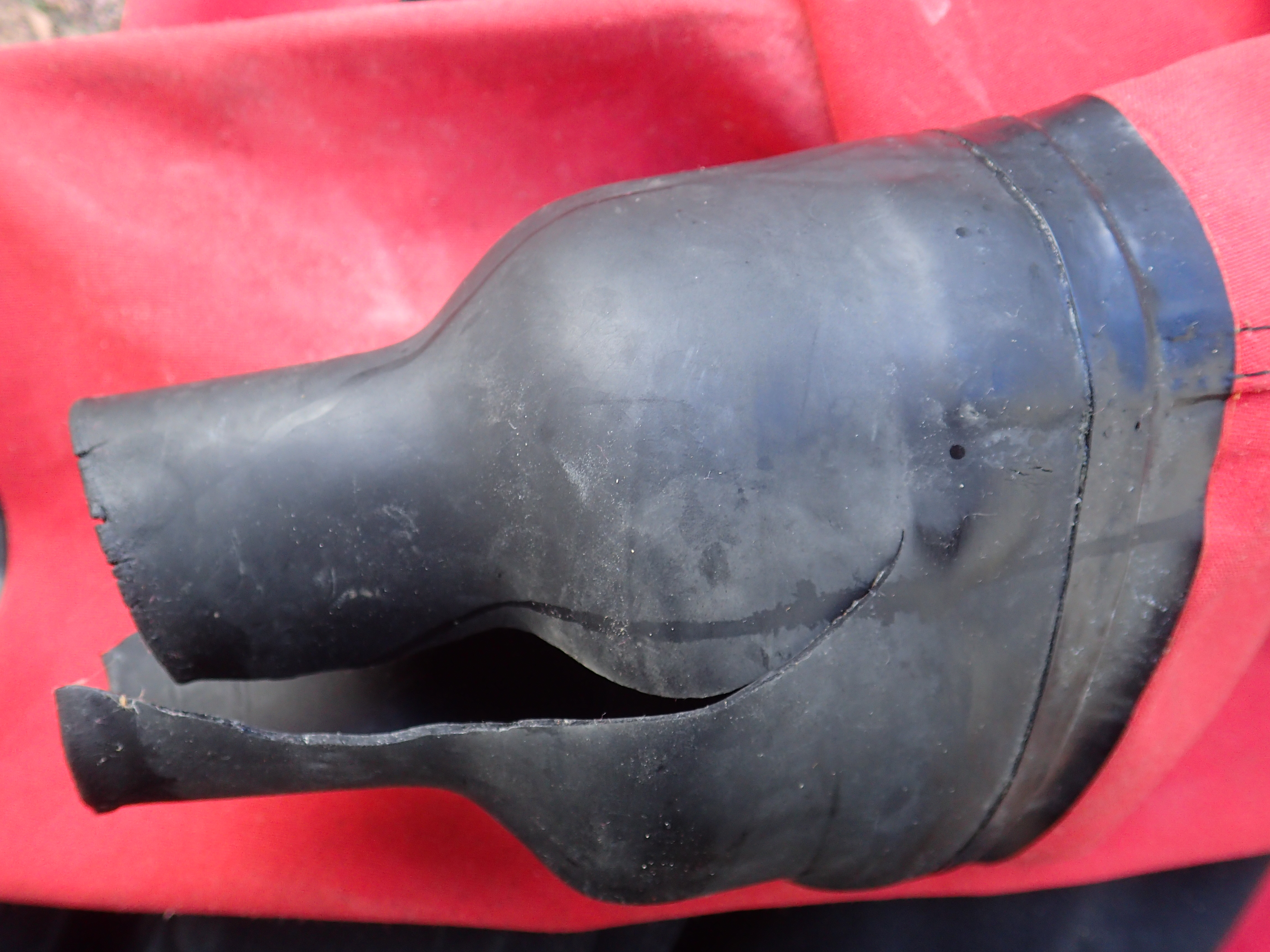
Torn latex rubber dry suit wrist seal

Natural rubber is reactive and vulnerable to oxidization, but it can be stabilized through a heating process called vulcanization. Vulcanization is a process by which the rubber is heated and sulfur, peroxide, or bisphenol are added to improve resistance and elasticity and to prevent it from oxidizing. Carbon black, which can be derived from a petroleum refinery or other natural incineration processes, is sometimes used as an additive to rubber to improve its strength, especially in vehicle tires.

During vulcanization, rubber's polyisoprene molecules (long chains of isoprene) are heated and cross-linked with molecular bonds to sulfur, forming a 3-D matrix. The optimal percentage of sulfur is approximately 10%. In this form, the polyisoprene molecules orientation is still random but they become aligned when the rubber is stretched. This sulfur vulcanization makes the rubber stronger and more rigid, but still very elastic. And through the vulcanization process, the sulfur and latex are meant to be totally used up in individual form.

=== Transportation ===
Natural rubber latex is shipped from factories in Southeast Asia, South America, and West and Central Africa to destinations around the world. As the cost of natural rubber has risen significantly and rubber products are dense, the shipping methods offering the lowest cost per unit weight are preferred. Depending on destination, warehouse availability, and transportation conditions, some methods are preferred by certain buyers. In international trade, latex rubber is mostly shipped in 20-foot ocean containers. Inside the container, smaller containers are used to store the latex.

== Rubber shortage and global economics ==
There is growing concern for the future supply of rubber due to various factors, including plant disease, climate change, and the volatile market price of rubber. Producers of natural rubber are mostly small family-held plantations, often serving large industrial aggregators. High volatility in the price of rubber affects rubber plantation investment, and farmers may remove their rubber trees if the international market spot price of a seemingly more profitable crop (for example palm oil) surges in relation to rubber.

For instance, during the 2020 and 2021 international COVID-19 pandemic, demand for rubber gloves surged, leading to a spike in rubber prices of about 30%. In addition to the pandemic, demand exceeded supply in part because long term plantations had been torn out and replaced with other crops over the previous 5–10 years, and other areas were affected by climate-fueled natural disasters. In this environment, producers did increase their prices in keeping with supply and demand dynamics, putting upward price pressure on the whole downstream supply chain.

== Uses ==
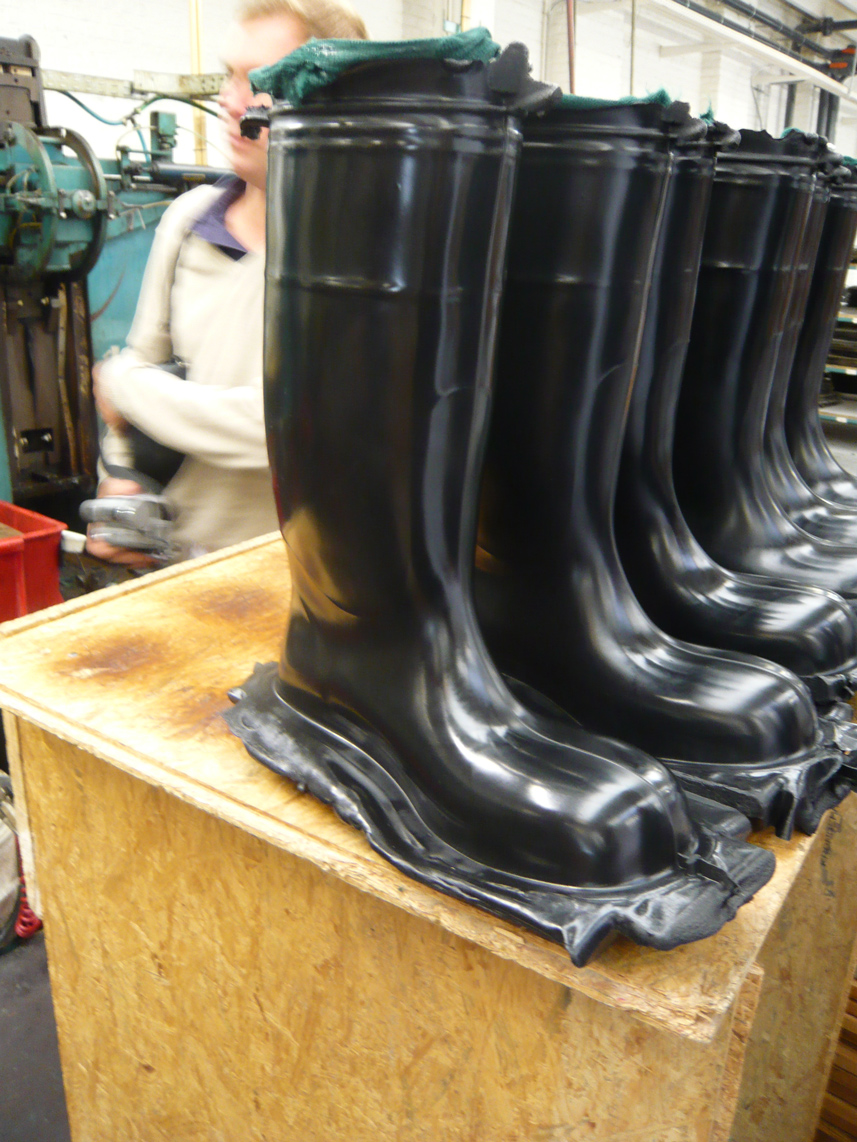
Compression molded (cured) rubber boots before the flashes are removed

Uncured rubber is used for cements; for adhesive, insulating, and friction tapes; and for crepe rubber used in insulating blankets and footwear. Vulcanized rubber has many more applications. Resistance to abrasion makes softer kinds of rubber valuable for the treads of vehicle tires and conveyor belts, and makes hard rubber valuable for pump housings and piping used in the handling of abrasive sludge.

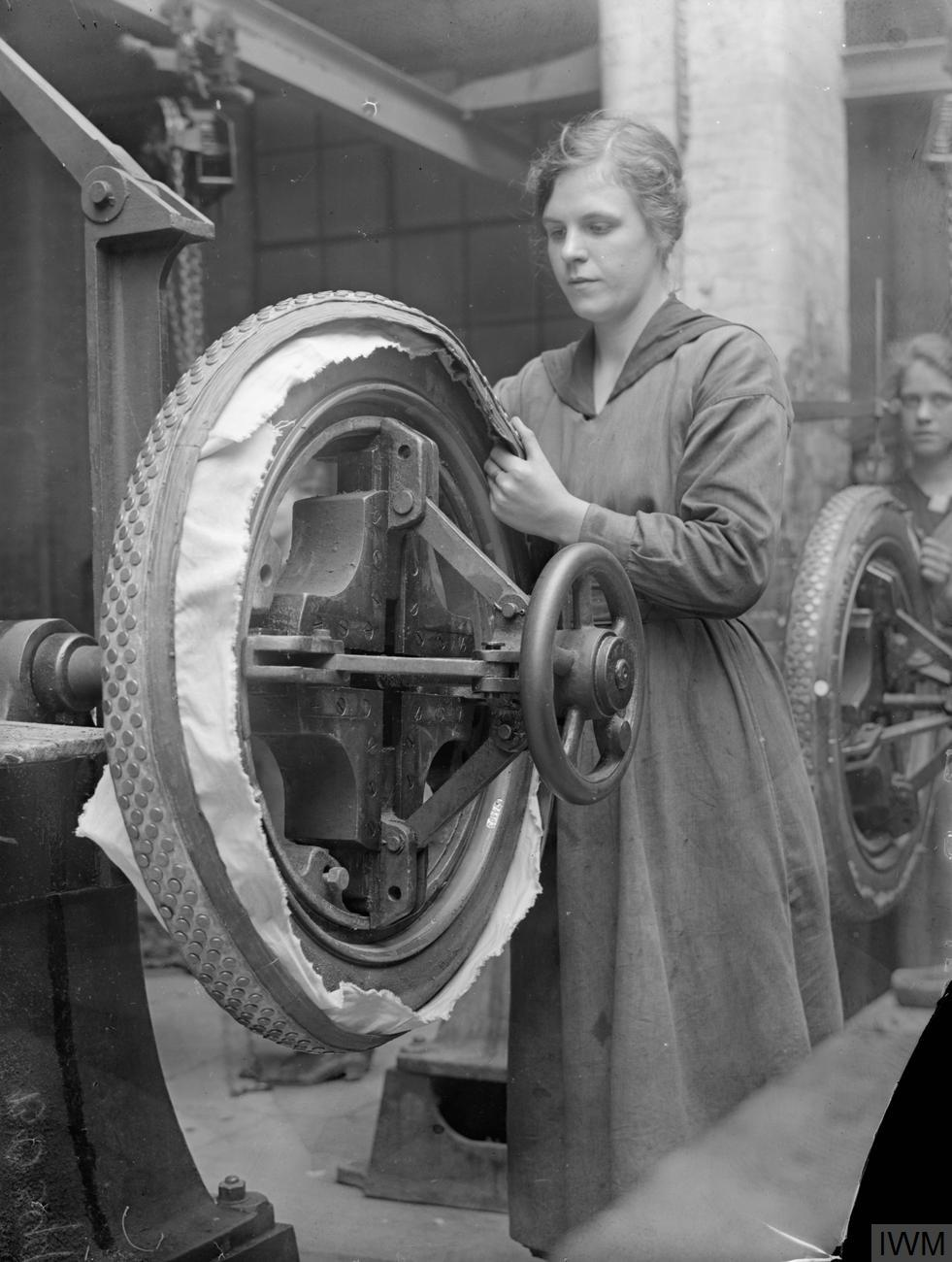
A factory worker producing a vehicle tire using natural rubber, September 1918

The flexibility of rubber is appealing in hoses, tires and rollers for devices ranging from domestic clothes wringers to printing presses; its elasticity makes it suitable for various kinds of shock absorbers and for specialized machinery mountings designed to reduce vibration. Its relative gas impermeability makes it useful in the manufacture of articles such as air hoses, balloons, balls and cushions. The resistance of rubber to water and to the action of most fluid chemicals has led to its use in rainwear, diving gear, and chemical and medicinal tubing and as a lining for storage tanks, processing equipment and railroad tank cars. Because of their electrical resistance, soft rubber goods are used as insulation and for protective gloves, shoes, and blankets; hard rubber is used for articles such as telephone housings and parts for radio sets, meters, and other electrical instruments. The coefficient of friction of rubber, which is high on dry surfaces and low on wet surfaces, leads to its use for power-transmission belting, highly flexible couplings, and for water-lubricated bearings in deep-well pumps. Indian rubber balls or lacrosse balls are made of rubber.

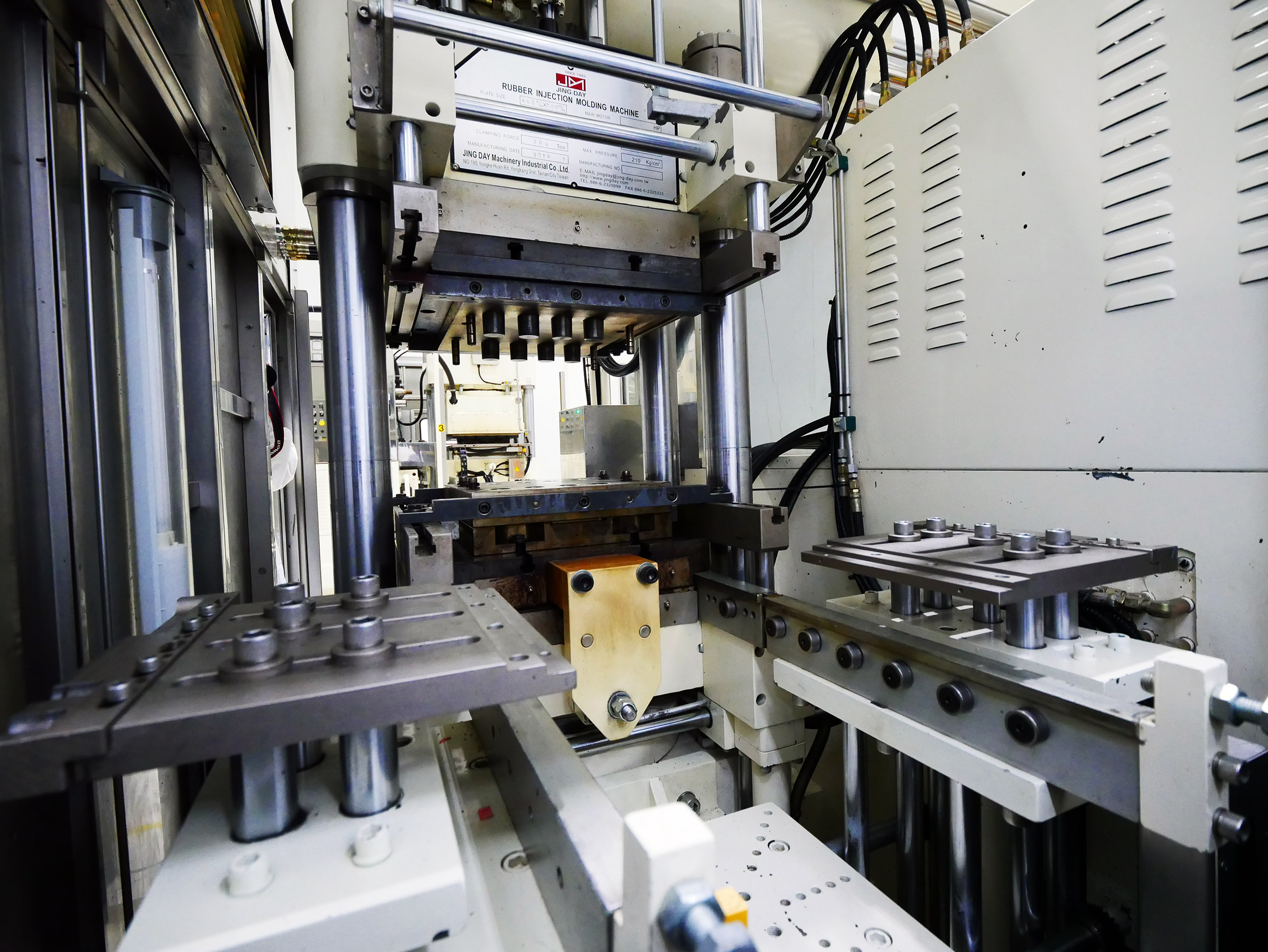
Compression molding machine for rubber parts

Around 25 million tonnes of rubber are produced each year, of which 30 percent is natural. The remainder is synthetic rubber derived from petrochemical sources. The top end of latex production results in latex products such as surgeons' gloves, balloons, and other relatively high-value products. The mid-range which comes from the technically specified natural rubber materials ends up largely in tires but also in conveyor belts, marine products, windshield wipers, and miscellaneous goods. Natural rubber offers good elasticity, while synthetic materials tend to offer better resistance to environmental factors such as oils, temperature, chemicals, and ultraviolet light. "Cured rubber" is rubber that has been compounded and subjected to the vulcanisation process to create cross-links within the rubber matrix. Rubber can be added to cement to improve its properties.

== Allergic reactions ==
Some people have a serious latex allergy, and exposure to natural latex rubber products such as latex gloves can cause anaphylactic shock. The antigenic proteins found in Hevea latex are reduced by about 99.9 percent (though not eliminated) through vulcanization processing.

Latex from non-Hevea sources, such as guayule, can be used without allergic reaction by persons with an allergy to Hevea latex.

Some allergic reactions are not to the latex itself, but from residues of chemicals used to accelerate the cross-linking process. Although this may be confused with an allergy to latex, it is distinct from it, typically taking the form of Type IV hypersensitivity in the presence of traces of specific processing chemicals.

== Microbial degradation ==
Natural rubber is susceptible to degradation by a wide range of bacteria. The bacteria Streptomyces coelicolor, Pseudomonas citronellolis, and Nocardia spp. are capable of degrading vulcanized natural rubber. It is, however, not advised to throw away rubber products in the organic waste, as rubber does not naturally degrade in typical home- or industrial compostable conditions.

== See also ==
- Akron, Ohio, center of the United States rubber industry
- Crepe rubber
- Ebonite
- Emulsion dispersion
- Fordlândia, failed attempt to establish a rubber plantation in Brazil
- Reinforced rubber
- Resilin, a highly elastic protein found in insects
- Rubber seed oil
- Rubber technology
- Stevenson Plan, historical British plan to stabilize rubber prices
- Charles Greville Williams, researched natural rubber being a polymer of the monomer isoprene
