= I, Pencil =

1958 essay by Leonard Read

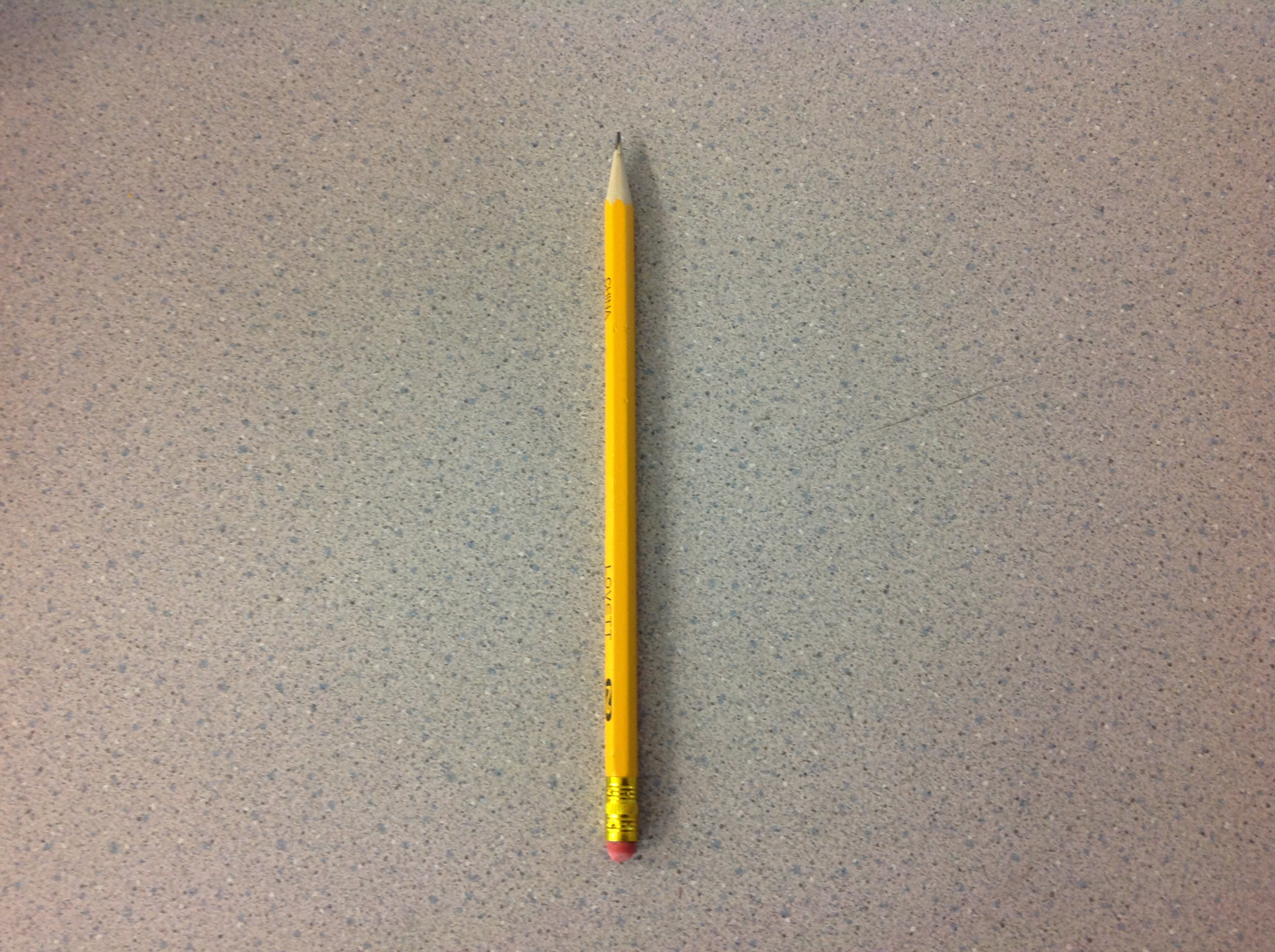
A pencil similar to the one described in the essay.

"I, Pencil: My Family Tree as Told to Leonard E. Read", commonly known as "I, Pencil", is an essay by Leonard Read, first published in the December 1958 issue of The Freeman.

== Essay ==
"I, Pencil" is written in the first person from the point of view of a pencil. The pencil details the complexity of its own creation, listing its components (cedar, lacquer, graphite, ferrule, factice, pumice, wax, glue) and the numerous people involved, down to the sweeper in the factory and the lighthouse keeper guiding the shipment into port.

No Master Mind

There is a fact still more astounding: The absence of a master mind, of anyone dictating or forcibly directing these countless actions which bring me into being. No trace of such a person can be found. Instead, we find the invisible hand at work.

... Since only God can make a tree, I insist that only God could make me. Man can no more direct these millions of know-hows to bring me into being than he can put molecules together to create a tree.

... The lesson I have to teach is this: Leave all creative energies uninhibited. Merely organize society to act in harmony with this lesson. Let society's legal apparatus remove all obstacles the best it can. Permit these creative know-hows freely to flow. Have faith that free men and women will respond to the Invisible Hand. This faith will be confirmed.

— "I, Pencil", 2008 edition

The essay uses this argument to illustrate a broader defense of free-market coordination.

It was reprinted in The Freeman in May 1996 and as a pamphlet entitled "I... Pencil" in May 1998. In the reprint, Milton Friedman wrote the introduction and Donald J. Boudreaux wrote the afterword. Friedman used the essay in his 1980 PBS television show Free to Choose and the accompanying book of the same name. In the 2008 50th Anniversary Edition, the introduction is written by Lawrence W. Reed and Friedman wrote the afterword.
