= Landolphia angustisepala =

Scientific classification
- Kingdom: Plantae
- Clade: Tracheophytes
- Clade: Angiosperms
- Clade: Eudicots
- Clade: Asterids
- Order: Gentianales
- Family: Apocynaceae
- Genus: Landolphia
- Species: L. angustisepala

Binomial name
- Landolphia angustisepala Pichon

Species of plant

Landolphia angustisepala is a species within the Apocynaceae family. It occurs in Gabon and the Democratic Republic of the Congo.

== Description ==
Landolphia angustisepala is a large liana with curled tendrils that grow up to 30 cm long, tendril hooks can reach 2.5 cm long. Its branches are red or brownish in color often with lenticels. Leaves, petiole is 3-6 mm long; when dry, its leaflets have a coriaceous surface, the leaf-blade is ovate to obovate in shape, apex is acuminate but sometimes rounded or obtuse and it is basally acute. The inflorescence is terminal, dichisial cyme is 1.1-3.6 cm long and 1.7-4.3 cm wide; its lanate or densely villose peduncle is 2-16 mm long, pedicel is 1-2.2 mm long and its corolla is creamy.

== Distribution ==
Occurs in the rainforest areas of Gabon and the Democratic Republic of the Congo.
