= Landolphia mannii =

Scientific classification
- Kingdom: Plantae
- Clade: Tracheophytes
- Clade: Angiosperms
- Clade: Eudicots
- Clade: Asterids
- Order: Gentianales
- Family: Apocynaceae
- Genus: Landolphia
- Species: L. mannii

Binomial name
- Landolphia mannii Dyer.

Flora of West Tropical Africa

Landolphia mannii is a liana within the dogbane family (Apocynaceae). It is commonly called Jungle chocolate or Malombo. Its fruit, with significant lipid and iron content is consumed by locals and it is also a part of the diet the Mandrillus sphinx.

== Description ==
This species is a climbing plant over 330 feet ("more than 100 meters") in length with branches that are brown or grey in color and are marked by narrow fissures and have light lenticels. Petioles are 4-13 mm long; leaflets are obovate to ovate in shape, glaucous, acuminate at the apex and acute at the base. Terminal inflorescence with tendril-like features, cymes are dense and sometimes at the end of the tendril hooks, the tendril hooks can grow up to 7 cm long. Peduncle grows up to 30 cm long; pedicels are commonly pubescent or pilose and are up to 5 mm long, anthers are 1.5 to 2.5 mm long. It has scented flowers, its calyx is1.8-5 mm in width, corolla is white, yellow or creamy. Fruit is large and globose, yellow, red or orange colored with a smooth surface and scattered brown or greyish lenticel, size is 8 to 26 cm (3 to 10 inches) long. Flowers throughout the year.

== Distribution ==
Occurs along rivers in the rainforest areas of Central Africa, Southern Nigeria and Northern Angola.
