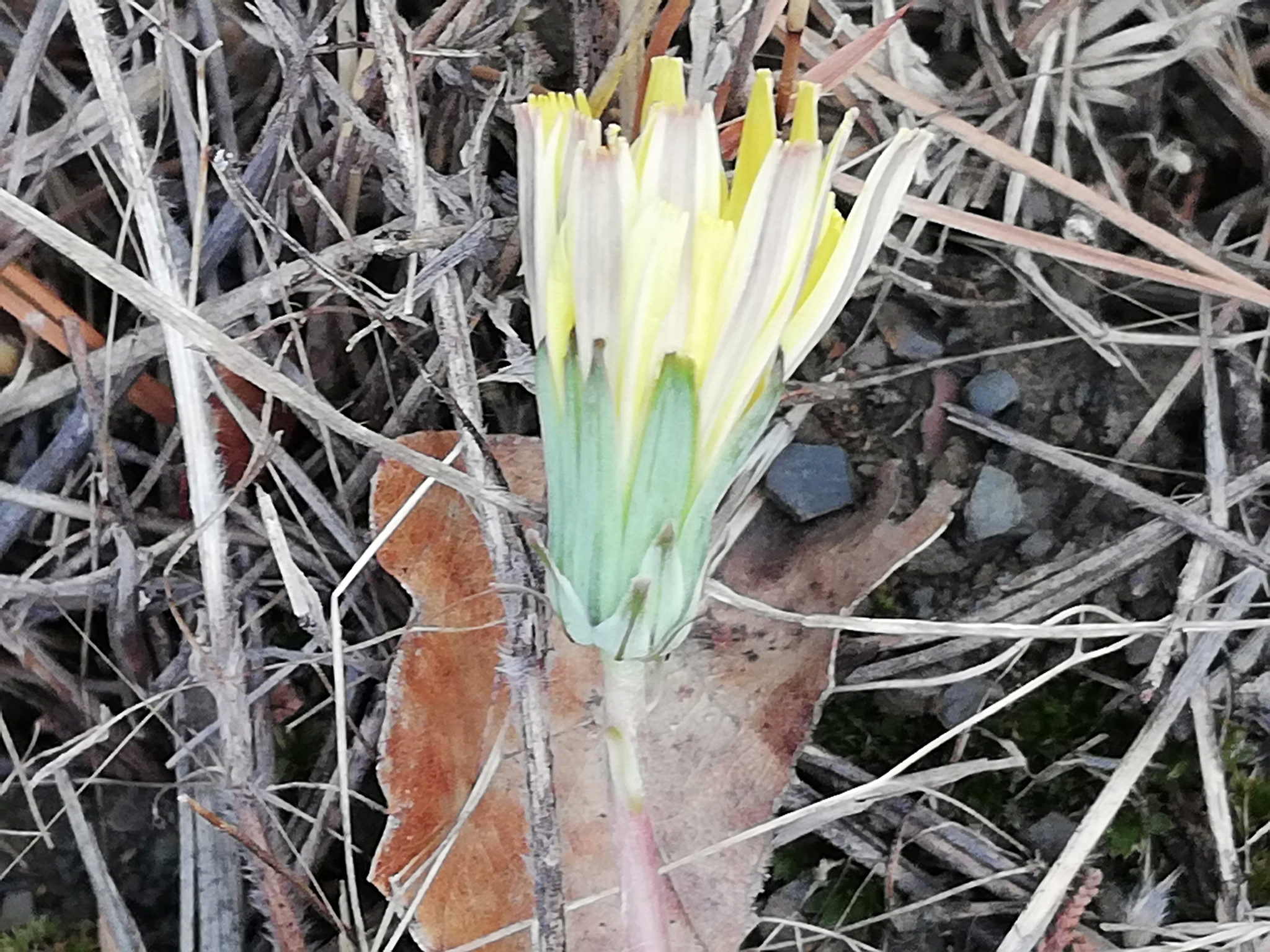

Scientific classification
- Kingdom: Plantae
- Clade: Tracheophytes
- Clade: Angiosperms
- Clade: Eudicots
- Clade: Asterids
- Order: Asterales
- Family: Asteraceae
- Genus: Taraxacum
- Species: T. hybernum

Binomial name
- Taraxacum hybernum Steven

Synonyms
- Taraxacum pobedimoviae Schischk.

= Taraxacum hybernum =

Species of flowering plant

Taraxacum hybernum, also known as krim-saghyz, or Autumn dandelion, is a perennial species of flowering plant in the family Asteraceae. In dry spring it produces only a rosette of leaves. In the wild, it blooms in spring or autumn, depending on moisture conditions, as a cultivated plant it has been reported to have two flowerings in one season.

== Distribution ==
Taraxacum hybernum is commonly found in Southern Europe, the Balkans, Crimea, and Turkey.

== Uses ==
It has been researched in the Soviet Union as a source of latex for rubber production, with "very good results" and 800ha worth of plantations in both North Caucasus and South Caucasus (as of 1934).

== See also ==
- Taraxacum kok-saghyz
- Scorzonera tau-saghyz
