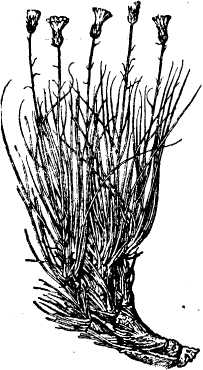

Scientific classification
- Kingdom: Plantae
- Clade: Tracheophytes
- Clade: Angiosperms
- Clade: Eudicots
- Clade: Asterids
- Order: Asterales
- Family: Asteraceae
- Genus: Takhtajaniantha
- Species: T. tau-saghyz

Binomial name
- Takhtajaniantha tau-saghyz (Lipsch. & G.G.Bosse) Zaika, Sukhor. & N.Kilian

Synonyms
- List: Ramaliella tau-saghyz (Lipsch. & G.G.Bosse) Yıld.; Scorzonera tau-saghyz Lipsch. & G.G.Bosse; Scorzonera karataviensis Kult.; Scorzonera kirghisorum Afanasiev; Scorzonera longipes Kult.; Scorzonera longipes var. kyzyl-kulensis Kult.; Scorzonera longipes var. tautaryensis Kult.; Scorzonera mariae Kult.; Scorzonera tau-saghyz subsp. karataviensis (Kult.) Kamelin; Scorzonera tau-saghyz subsp. longipes (Kult.) Kamelin; Scorzonera tau-saghyz subsp. mariae (Kult.) Kamelin & Tagaev; Scorzonera tau-saghyz subsp. tautaryensis (Kult.) Kamelin; Scorzonera tau-saghyz subsp. usbekistanica Tagaev; Scorzonera uzbekistanica Czevr. & Bondarenko

= Takhtajaniantha tau-saghyz =

Species of flowering plant from central Asia

Takhtajaniantha tau-saghyz is a species of plant in the family Asteraceae.

It is endemic to Tajikistan, Uzbekistan and the Karatau Mountains of Kazakhstan in Central Asia.

== Uses ==
Takhtajaniantha tau-saghyz is of interest as a source of latex suitable for making natural rubber, with latex (in old specimens on averaging 20%) contained in large roots and underground stems extending from them. The Soviet Union cultivated this species, together with Taraxacum hybernum and Taraxacum kok-saghyz, on a large scale between 1931 and 1950—notably during World War II—as an emergency source of rubber when supplies of rubber from Hevea brasiliensis in Southeast Asia were threatened.
