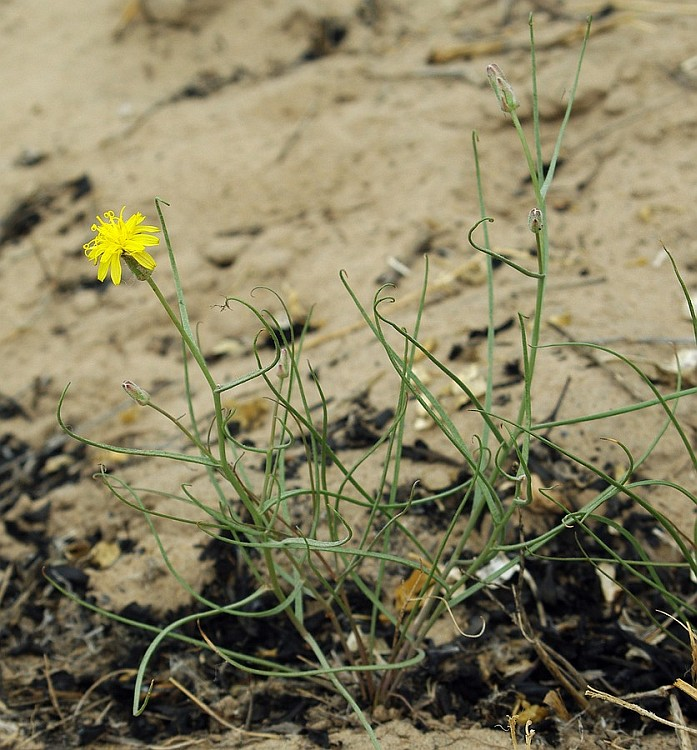
- Takhtajaniantha pusilla
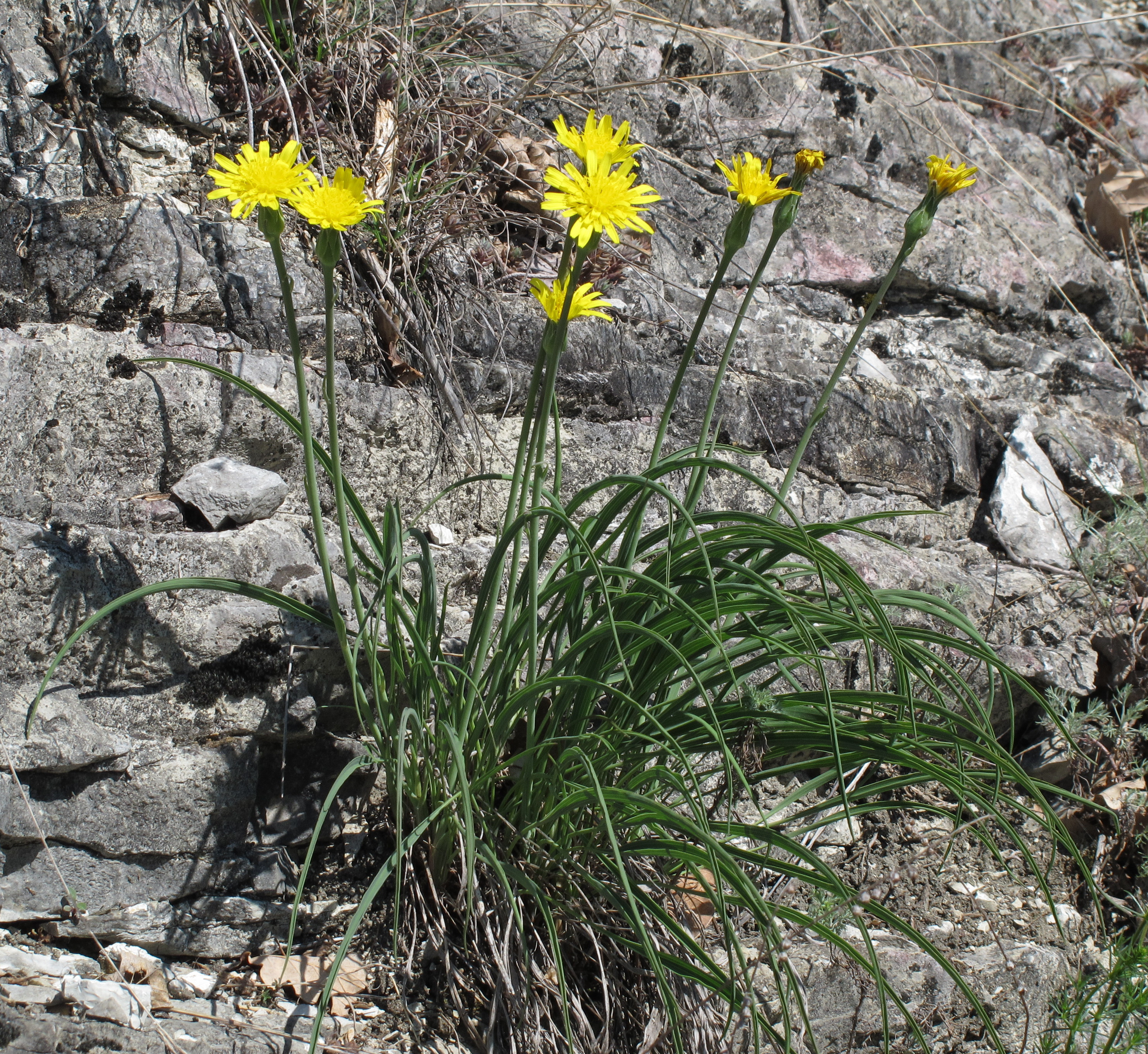
- Takhtajaniantha austriaca

Scientific classification
- Kingdom: Plantae
- Clade: Tracheophytes
- Clade: Angiosperms
- Clade: Eudicots
- Clade: Asterids
- Order: Asterales
- Family: Asteraceae
- Subfamily: Cichorioideae
- Tribe: Cichorieae
- Subtribe: Scorzonerinae
- Genus: Takhtajaniantha; Nazarova

= Takhtajaniantha =

Genus of plants

Takhtajaniantha is a genus of flowering plants in the tribe Cichorieae within the family Asteraceae, widespread across central Asia, Middle east and eastern Europe.

The genus is named for Armenian botanist Armen Takhtajan, 1910-2009.

== Species ==
The following species are recognised in the genus Takhtajaniantha:

- Takhtajaniantha austriaca (Willd.) Zaika, Sukhor. & N.Kilian
- Takhtajaniantha capito (Maxim.) Zaika, Sukhor. & N.Kilian
- Takhtajaniantha crispa (M.Bieb.) Zaika, Sukhor. & N.Kilian
- Takhtajaniantha ikonnikovii (Lipsch. & Krasch.) Zaika, Sukhor. & N.Kilian
- Takhtajaniantha mongolica (Maxim.) Zaika, Sukhor. & N.Kilian
- Takhtajaniantha pseudodivaricata (Lipsch.) Zaika, Sukhor. & N.Kilian
- Takhtajaniantha pusilla (Pall.) Nazarova
- Takhtajaniantha subacaulis (Regel) Zaika, Sukhor. & N.Kilian
- Takhtajaniantha tau-saghyz (Lipsch. & G.G.Bosse) Zaika, Sukhor. & N.Kilian
- Takhtajaniantha veresczaginii (Kamelin & S.V.Smirn.) Kamelin & S.V.Smirn.
