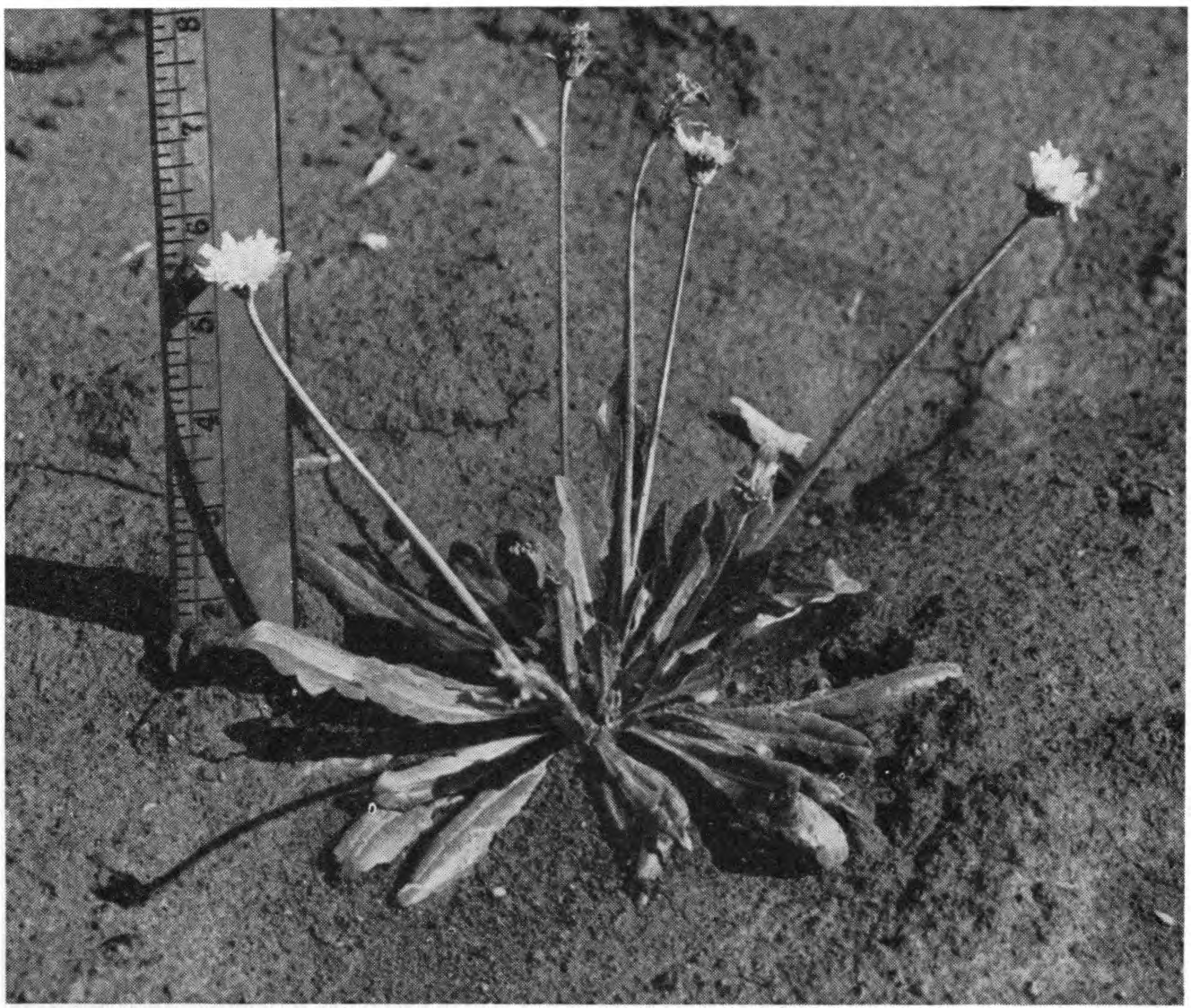
- The Russian dandelion

Scientific classification
- Kingdom: Plantae
- Clade: Tracheophytes
- Clade: Angiosperms
- Clade: Eudicots
- Clade: Asterids
- Order: Asterales
- Family: Asteraceae
- Genus: Taraxacum
- Species: T. kok-saghyz

Binomial name
- Taraxacum kok-saghyz L.E.Rodin

= Taraxacum kok-saghyz =

Species of flowering plant

Taraxacum kok-saghyz, often abbreviated as TKS and commonly referred to as the Kazakh dandelion, rubber root, or Russian dandelion, is a species of dandelion native to Kazakhstan, Kyrgyzstan and Uzbekistan, notable for its production of high-quality rubber. T. kok-saghyz was discovered in Kazakhstan in 1932 by Soviet scientists seeking a domestic source of rubber.

== Etymology ==
Kok-saghyz is derived from the Kazakh kök-sağız (көк-сағыз), with kök meaning green and saghyz meaning rubber or gum. Its latex was traditionally used as a kind of chewing gum.

== Description ==
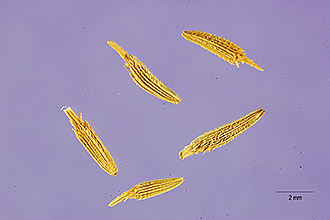
T. kok-saghyz fruits

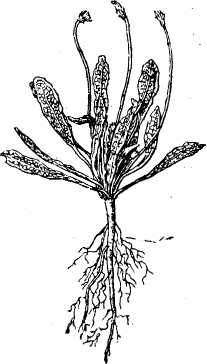
Botanical illustration

Taraxacum kok-saghyz is a perennial plant with a yellow composite flower characteristic of the genus Taraxacum. Each flower head may be approximately one inch in diameter and be made up of 50 to 90 florets. Plants may contain 25 to 50 leaves arranged in one or more rosettes at the upper end of the root. Taraxacum kok-saghyz can be differentiated from the common dandelion (Taraxacum officinale) by its generally smaller, grayish green leaves and hornlike structures on the bracts surrounding the bud. Flowers are hermaphrodite, insect-pollinated (entomophilous) and are on stalks that reach about a foot in height. Taraxacum kok-saghyz is usually in flower from May through June, with seeds ripening from June through July.

It is a diploid species that reproduces sexually, and produces good pollen. Another species, a triploid apomict that also has horned bracts and produces rubber, T. brevicorniculatum Korol. has frequently been misidentified as T. kok-saghyz.

== History ==
TKS was cultivated on a large scale in the Soviet Union during World War II. The Soviet Union cultivated Taraxacum kok-saghyz, together with Taraxacum hybernum and Scorzonera tau-saghyz, on a large scale between 1931 and 1950—notably during World War II—as an emergency source of rubber when supplies of rubber from Hevea brasiliensis in Southeast Asia were threatened. The United States, the UK, Germany, Sweden and Spain also cultivated the plant for the same reason. During this period, the highest yields achieved by the U.S. reached 110 kg of rubber per hectare, while the USSR achieved yields of 200 kg of rubber per hectare. The Raisko sub-camp of Auschwitz was a German-operated production factory for the plant. Some of the women deported on the Convoi des 31000 worked on its production there. With the conclusion of World War II and the return of affordable Hevea brasiliensis rubber (which has 8 to 10 times the yield), the majority of T. kok-saghyz programs ceased.

== Growth and cultivation ==
=== Growing conditions ===
Taraxacum kok-saghyz does best in loose, well-drained soils with high moisture retention and a pH between 5.5 and 8.5, in full or nearly-full sun. The plant grows well in temperate climates. The greatest growth is recorded in soils containing 2–8% organic matter.

=== Seeding ===
TKS produces about 1 million seeds per pound. The seeds readily germinate but grow very slowly despite the early development of a strong root system. Because of their slow growth, the seedlings are vulnerable to being outcompeted by native weeds. Slow growth and weed control remain major challenges in successfully growing TKS today. The direct seeding of TKS has been identified by researchers as the preferred method for establishing a crop. Field studies showed that TKS germination occurs in May. The vulnerability during early life stages is the main reason why the pest risk assessment, conducted by the Julius Kühn Institute, revealed little invasive potential for TKS in Germany.

=== Challenges ===
Currently, the main challenges of growing TKS include plant germination, seedling vigor, growth rate, and weed control. Weed control is ineffective, as current available herbicides often have undesired side effects such as injuring the plant itself or slowing its development. However, weed control is inevitable as uncontrolled weed pressure reduces crop survival and plant growth rate. In addition, the cultivation of TKS in rows is impractical due to the morphology of the plant. Current studies of plant genome aim to identify genetic markers to improve TKS germplasm. Moreover, the development of weed resistance through traditional plant breeding techniques is being investigated.

=== Pests and disease ===
In 2022, scientists have reported the first rust disease on TKS in China, caused by Puccinia hieracii. It leads to moderate to high yield losses and poses a potential threat for large scale production of TKS.

=== Harvest ===
TKS can be harvested after a single growing season. Rubber accumulation begins at germination, peaks at around one year, and then levels off or decreases due to older root tissues being shed and destroyed by microorganisms.

== Utility ==
=== Rubber ===
Natural rubber (cis-1,4-polyisoprene) is a polymer produced by plants. Natural rubber is obtained from coagulating and refining latex from plant species. In many of its most significant applications, it cannot be replaced by synthetic rubber alternatives. Some of the unique and unreplaceable properties include abrasion resistance, elasticity, tear and impact resistance, malleability at cold temperatures, and efficient heat dispersion. The production of natural rubber is concentrated in the tropical areas of Asian-Pacific countries, and it comes from the Para rubber tree (Hevea brasiliensis). The natural rubber market is coordinated by the Association of Natural Rubber Producing Countries (ANRPC). This intergovernmental association represents 92% of the world's natural rubber production. There are a number of factors driving the search for alternatives to natural rubber production.

One threat to Hevea brasiliensis rubber production is the South American Leaf Blight (SALB) caused by Pseudocercospora ulei fungi, which has afflicted conventional rubber production in South America since 1934. This blight may spread to the Hevea brasiliensis trees in Southeast Asia, which are genetically very similar to each other and to those of South America. Furthermore, land used for rubber production is being converted to palm-oil plantations in order to produce biofuel, and labor costs reduce the profitability of Hevea brasiliensis plantations, as each tree must be manually tapped in order to harvest its latex. Rising oil-prices limit the economic viability of synthetic rubbers, and synthetic equivalents often cannot pragmatically replace natural rubber. In May 2019 German tire-maker Continental AG announced it was about to begin production of the "first bicycle tyre made with sustainable rubber from dandelions", which it intended to grow on the grounds of its own manufacturing plants, avoiding several of the traditional issues with H. brasiliensis latex—from the long lead-time between planting and cultivating (only six months for the dandelion, rather than seven years for the rubber tree) and volatile prices of the product due to the long transport-distances between places where the rubber can be grown and the company's factories.

Additionally, there is increasing evidence of allergenic reactions to Hevea rubber used in medical devices (gloves, condoms, catheters, and other medical products), potential shortages of supply due to increasing demand (The global market of natural rubber increases annually by 1–3%.), changes in land use, and a general trend towards the replacement of petroleum-derived chemicals with renewables, which are pushing the search for new sources of natural rubber.

One of the alternative options is TKS. It contains on average 12% natural rubber and has an average yield of 225–750 kg/ha. Compared to Hevea brasiliensis, the yield of TKS is not enough to cover the cost of both collection and processing. Researchers have started to develop Taraxacum kok-saghyz cultivars which are easier to cultivate and which produce more and better rubber as part of a large research project at many institutions.

=== Storage ===
An important stage of the rubber production that also plays a role in the success of the TKS as a crop, is the storage of the roots. They should be stored and handled differently depending on the dimension of the roots and the harvesting season. In general, dry roots can be stored for at least nine months in a dry environment. In order to maximise the productivity, small roots (under 10 g fresh weight) are processed or dried immediately after harvesting. For large roots it is better to store them fresh in a refrigerated room. Cold conditions, besides stabilizing the rubber content, also increase the rubber content in the roots due to the cold induction of the rubber biosynthetic pathway. This is especially important if the harvest time is before the cold season.

=== Processing ===
Right after harvesting, the roots are washed from dirt and soil. If roots are not directly processed, because of transportation reason, they must be dried and then can be stored for several months under appropriate conditions.

The process of rubber-extraction follows this pattern:

1. leach the roots in hot water: it softens the tissue and coagulates the latex in fine filament. Also, this removes the soluble carbohydrates (mainly inulin), that can be further used for the ethanol production.
2. Pebble grinding: loosens the plant tissue and rolls together the rubber filaments, which can be separated from the root solids by passing over a vibrating screen and flotation.
3. Separation through vibrating screen and flotation: for the separation of the rubber filament from the root solids.

This process recovered well over 90% of the total rubber in the roots. Another processing option would be the extraction of rubber as latex.

=== Dandelion by-products ===
Inulin produced by TKS is a sugar that could be used in non-food applications or be turned into bioethanol through fermentation. The remaining plant biomass could be used to produce biogas. If the plant is cultivated for this by-product, it is important that the roots are not stored in refrigerated conditions, because the roots degrade inulin to provide the substrates for rubber biosynthesis.

== Breeding ==
=== Goals ===
The growing interest in natural rubber increases the interest in genetically modified organisms. This need is explained by the decrease of natural rubber world resources, the indispensability of natural rubber for industry, and the strategic necessity of a national industry to be independent of the import. The main breeding goals are increasing both the percentage of rubber content in the plant and the vegetative mass of the plant. Compared to other rubber producing plant, the heritability of yield related traits are lower, implying a slower breeding progress for TKS.

=== Strategies ===
The rubber percentage and the size of the roots could be increased through open pollinated polycrosses, resulting in doubled rubber yields. The rubber percentage in TKS could potentially be increased through breeding to 15 to 25% of dry weight. Three genes are mainly responsible for the biosynthesis of rubber: REF (rubber elongation factor), SRPP (small rubber particle protein) and CPT (cis-prenyltransferase). The role of these genes was proved in 2016 by the Hevea genome sequence analysis. With the insertion of these genes into the nuclear DNA of TKS, it is possible to increase the content and the quality of rubber in the plant. Genetic engineering allows to increase the rubber content of TKS in two ways: either through inulin degradation by gene 1-FEN expression or through knockdown of the gene fructan 1-fructosyl transferase (1-FFT), which codes for the fructose involved in inulin synthesis. Regarding the competitiveness with weeds, creating herbicide resistant TKS plants is a possible strategy to solve this problem. Hybridization between rubber dandelion TKS and common dandelion (Taraxacum officinale) has been proposed as a possible way to achieve this resistance.

== See also ==
- Hevea brasiliensis
