= Landolphia buchananii =

Scientific classification
- Kingdom: Plantae
- Clade: Tracheophytes
- Clade: Angiosperms
- Clade: Eudicots
- Clade: Asterids
- Order: Gentianales
- Family: Apocynaceae
- Genus: Landolphia
- Species: L. buchananii

Binomial name
- Landolphia buchananii (Hallier f.) Stapf

Synonyms
- Clitandra buchananii Hallier f.; Clitandra kilimandjarica Warb.; Clitandra semlikiensis Robyns & Boutique; Jasminochyla ugandensis (Stapf) Pichon; Landolphia cameronis Stapf; Landolphia kilimandjarica (Warb.) Stapf; Landolphia rogersii Stapf; Landolphia swynnertonii S.Moore; Landolphia ugandensis Stapf

Species of plant

Landolphia buchananii is a liana within the Apocynaceae family. It is sometimes called Nandi rubber in English and known locally as Mugu among Kikuyus. Occurs in savannahs and montane forests in East Africa and Southeastern Nigeria.

== Description ==
As a climbing liana, it that can go as high as 40 meters and reach a diameter of 23 cm, occasionally, a sarmentose shrub, it can be capable of reaching 7 meters high; its stem is dark brown with white latex. Coriaceous leaves and a glabrous or pilose petiole that is 1.5-8 mm long. Leaf blades are elliptic to obovate in outline, 1.9-14.5 cm long and 0.8-6 cm wide; leaflets are covered with minute or woolly hairs but can occasionally be glabrous. Terminal inflorescence, 2-20 flowered, composed of sepals that glabrous on the outside; fragrant flower with white, creamy or yellowish colored corolla and tubes that are sometimes green. Peduncle can be tendril like, curled or elongate and is 5-33 mm long, pedicel is 1.2-6.5 mm long. Fruit, 2-20 seeded is globular in form, usually green with white or light brown spots on it.

== Distribution ==
Occurs in West, Central and East Africa, from Nigeria in the west to Sudan in Central Africa and southwards to Zimbabwe.

== Uses ==
Ripe fruits are eaten by locals while stems are used in rope and basket making, root extracts are traditionally used to treat gonorrhea and bilharzia while leaf extracts are used to treat wounds.
