= Landolphia dulcis =

Scientific classification
- Kingdom: Plantae
- Clade: Tracheophytes
- Clade: Angiosperms
- Clade: Eudicots
- Clade: Asterids
- Order: Gentianales
- Family: Apocynaceae
- Genus: Landolphia
- Species: L. dulcis

Binomial name
- Landolphia dulcis (Sabine ex G.Don) Pichon

Species of plant

Landolphia dulcis is a climbing shrub or liana within the Apocynaceae family.

== Description ==
The species is capable of growing up to 5m tall as a sarmentose shrub and reach a height of 10m as a liana. Leaves, the glabrous or pilose petiole is 2-17 mm long; leaf-blade is ovate to obovate in outline, leaflets have a coriaceous surface, leaf apex is emarginate to acuminate while the base is cordate to cuneate. The inflorescence is axillary with 1-3 flower per axil, peduncle is 0.5-5.5 mm long, pedicels are 0.1-3.1 mm long. The flowers are fragrant, the calyx is green, brown or violet, 2-2.9 mm long with 4 or 5 unequal sepals. The corolla is often discolorous and is commonly dark green, yellow, violet, cream or reddish. Fruit is globular, 5-50 seeded, commonly green, orange, yellow or red turning blackish or reddish when cut.

== Distribution ==
Largely occurs in West Africa, from Senegal to Nigeria, also found in Central Africa, in particular, Gabon and Angola.

== Chemistry ==
Root of the species contains aromadendrene compounds, a group of sesquiterpenes.

== Uses ==
Leaf and stem bark extracts are part of a decoction used by herbalists in treating chronic sore, body pains and dysentery. Its fruit is edible and eaten by locals. Latex is sometimes used as birdlime.
