= Factice =

Factice is vulcanized unsaturated vegetable or animal oil, used as a processing aid and property modifier in rubber.

Longer chain fatty-acid containing oils such as rapeseed or meadowfoam produce a harder, more desirable factice. Soybean oil produces lower quality factice, though it can be mixed with longer-chain oils to yield factice nearly as good as that made from long chain oils alone. Oil-resistant factice is made with castor oil.

Cross-linking the fatty-acid chains with sulfur (brown factice) or disulfur dichloride (white factice) yields a rubbery material that improves the processing characteristics and ozone resistance of rubber. Varying the amount of factice changes the physical properties of the rubber; molded items might be 5–10% factice, extrusions 15–30%. Rubber erasers can have as much as 4 times as much factice as rubber in their composition.
