= Landolphia kirkii =

Scientific classification
- Kingdom: Plantae
- Clade: Tracheophytes
- Clade: Angiosperms
- Clade: Eudicots
- Clade: Asterids
- Order: Gentianales
- Family: Apocynaceae
- Genus: Landolphia
- Species: L. kirkii

Binomial name
- Landolphia kirkii Dyer

Species of flowering plant

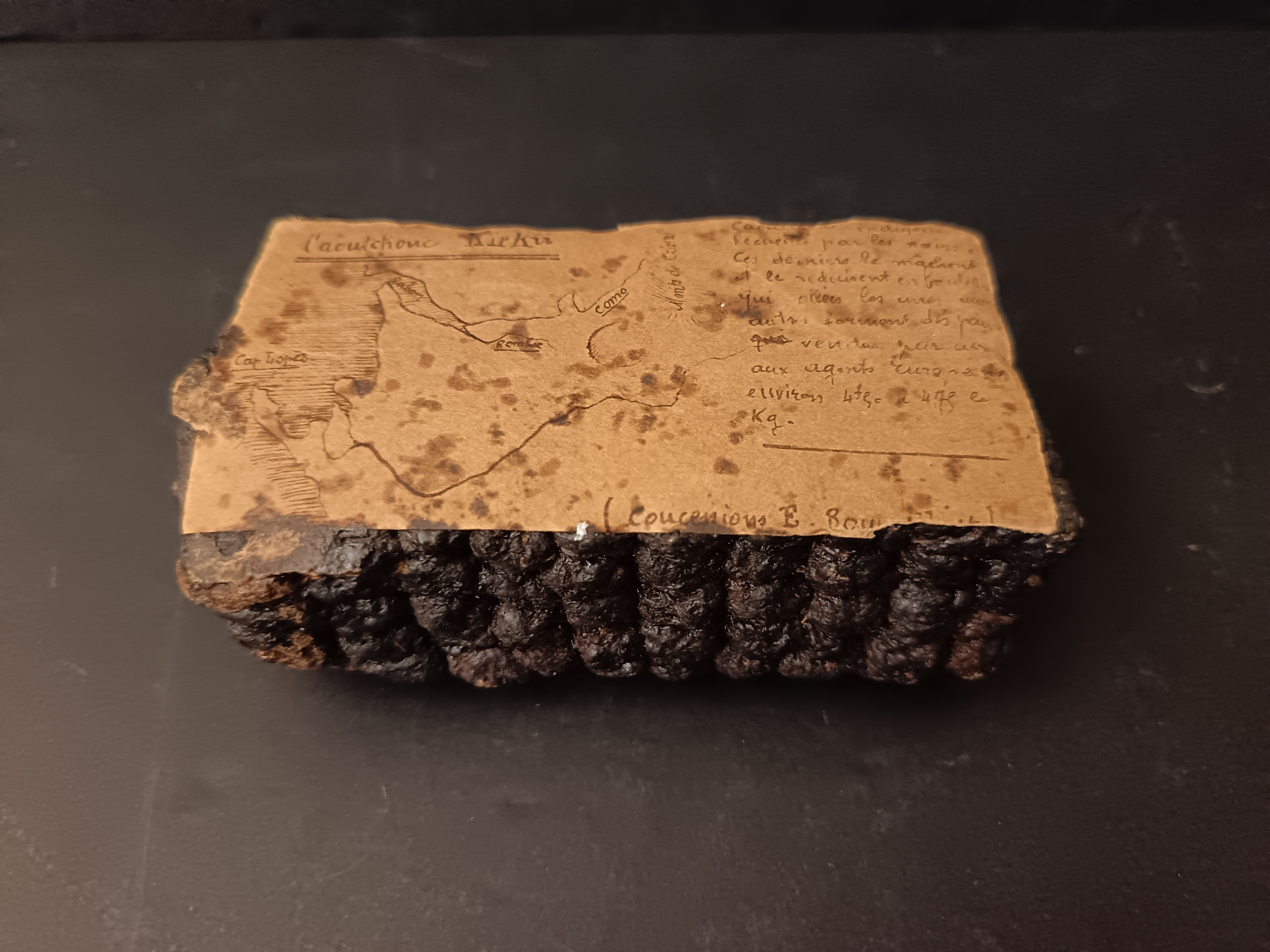
Landolphia kirkii : rubber chewed to be reduced into balls stuck together to form this bread.

Landolphia kirkii (known as sand apricot-vine, rubber vine or Kirk's landolphia) is a species of liana from the family Apocynaceae that can be found in Democratic Republic of the Congo, Malawi, Mozambique, Tanzania, Zambia, Zimbabwe, and in the KwaZulu-Natal province of South Africa.

== Description ==
The leaves of Landolphia kirkii are oblong and sometimes ovate and can reach up to 9 centimetres (3.5 in) in length. They are glossy green coloured from above, and have a channeled midrib. They have 10-12 pairs of lateral veins, with a net-veining that is slightly raised just above the midrib, that is pubescent underneath. The inflorescence has many flowers, which are white or creamy-yellow coloured and have a diameter of 1 centimetre (0.39 in). The flowers also have a tube that is 3.5–4 millimetres (0.14–0.16 in) long. The green fruits are spherical with a diameter of 15 centimetres (5.9 in), and are edible.

== Systematics ==
The specific epithet kirkii commemorates John Kirk, a companion of David Livingstone, who traveled to Zambezia for an expedition in 1858.

The bungo fruit widely growing on Pemba and Zanzibar islands in the Indian Ocean highly likely belongs to this species.
