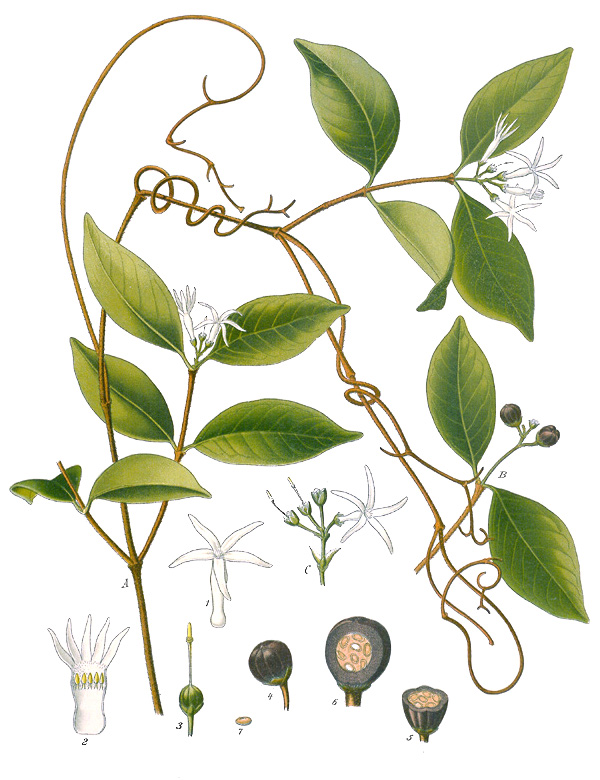
- Landolphia watsoniana

Scientific classification
- Kingdom: Plantae
- Clade: Tracheophytes
- Clade: Angiosperms
- Clade: Eudicots
- Clade: Asterids
- Order: Gentianales
- Family: Apocynaceae
- Subfamily: Rauvolfioideae
- Tribe: Willughbeieae
- Subtribe: Landolphiinae
- Genus: Landolphia; P.Beauv.

Synonyms
- Alstonia Scop., rejected name; Anthoclitandra (Pierre) Pichon; Aphanostylis Pierre; Carpodinus R.Br. ex G.Don; Djeratonia Pierre; Faterna Noronha ex A.DC.; Jasminochyla (Stapf) Pichon; Vahea Poir., rejected name; Willughbeia Klotzsch 1861 not Roxb. 1820

= Landolphia =

Genus of flowering plants

Landolphia is a genus of flowering plants in the family Apocynaceae first described as a genus in 1806. They take the form of vines that scramble over host trees. Landolphia is native to tropical Africa.

== Characteristics ==
There are about fifty species of Landolphia in continental Africa and about fourteen more species in Madagascar. They are typically found in forest habitats in tropical West and Central Africa, scrambling over trees, but a few species are large shrubs. They have simple, glossy green leaves in opposite pairs, jasmine-like flowers with tubes and parts in fives, and hard-shelled, fleshy fruits with several seeds embedded in the pulp. After fruiting, the flower stem develops into a twisting tendril which branches near its tip.

== Uses ==
Members of this genus exude latex when the bark is damaged. The vines have traditionally been used to supply rubber but that function has increasingly been taken over by the rubber tree, Hevea brasiliensis which can be conveniently grown in plantations. The latex from these vines is still used to a limited extent for rubber production. Many species have large edible fruits which are sweet and juicy and rich in beta-carotene. However, commercialisation of the crop is difficult because of the nature of the vines, their need for suitable supports and the lack of knowledge of suitable cultivation techniques.

Species

1. Landolphia angustisepala - Gabon, Zaïre
2. Landolphia axillaris - Gabon
3. Landolphia breviloba - Gabon, Congo
4. Landolphia bruneelii - Gabon, Congo, Cameroon, Zaïre
5. Landolphia buchananii - C + E + S Africa
6. Landolphia calabarica - W Africa
7. Landolphia camptoloba - C Africa
8. Landolphia congolensis - C Africa
9. Landolphia cuneifolia - S Zaïre, NW Zambia
10. Landolphia dewevrei - C Africa
11. Landolphia dulcis - W + C Africa
12. Landolphia elliptica - Madagascar
13. Landolphia eminiana - C + E Africa
14. Landolphia exilis - Madagascar
15. Landolphia ferrea - Gabon, Congo
16. Landolphia flavidiflora - Cameroon
17. Landolphia foretiana - W + C Africa
18. Landolphia fragrans - Madagascar
19. Landolphia glabra - C Africa
20. Landolphia glandulosa - Gabon, Cameroon
21. Landolphia gossweileri - SE Angola, Zambia
22. Landolphia gummifera - Madagascar
23. Landolphia heudelotii - W Africa
24. Landolphia hirsuta - W Africa
25. Landolphia hispidula - Madagascar
26. Landolphia incerta - W + C + S Africa
27. Landolphia jumellei - C Africa
28. Landolphia kirkii E + C + SE Africa
29. Landolphia lanceolata - Congo, Zaire, Angola
30. Landolphia landolphioides - C + E Africa
31. Landolphia le-testui - C Africa
32. Landolphia lecomtei - C Africa
33. Landolphia leptantha - Gabon, Cameroon, Nigeria
34. Landolphia ligustrifolia - Congo, Zaire, Gabon, Cameroon
35. Landolphia macrantha - Sierra Leone, Guinea
36. Landolphia mandrianambo - Madagascar
37. Landolphia mannii - C Africa
38. Landolphia maxima - Gabon, Cameroon, Nigeria
39. Landolphia membranacea - W Africa
40. Landolphia micrantha - W Africa
41. Landolphia myrtifolia - Madagascar
42. Landolphia nitens - Madagascar
43. Landolphia nitidula - Liberia, Ivory Coast
44. Landolphia noctiflora - Gabon
45. Landolphia obliquinervia - Madagascar
46. Landolphia owariensis - much of tropical Africa
47. Landolphia parvifolia - C + E + S Africa
48. Landolphia platyclada - Madagascar
49. Landolphia pyramidata - Gabon, Central African Republic
50. Landolphia reticulata - Gabon
51. Landolphia robustior - C Africa
52. Landolphia rufescens - Zaïre, Angola, Zambia
53. Landolphia sphaerocarpa - Madagascar
54. Landolphia stenogyna - Gabon, Cameroon, Nigeria
55. Landolphia subrepanda - C Africa
56. Landolphia tenuis - Madagascar
57. Landolphia thollonii - Zaïre, Angola, Congo
58. Landolphia togolana - W Africa
59. Landolphia trichostigma - Madagascar
60. Landolphia uniflora - Gabon, Cameroon, Nigeria
61. Landolphia × utilis - Ivory Coast
62. Landolphia villosa - C Africa
63. Landolphia violacea - C Africa
64. Landolphia watsoniana - Kenya, Tanzania, Mozambique
