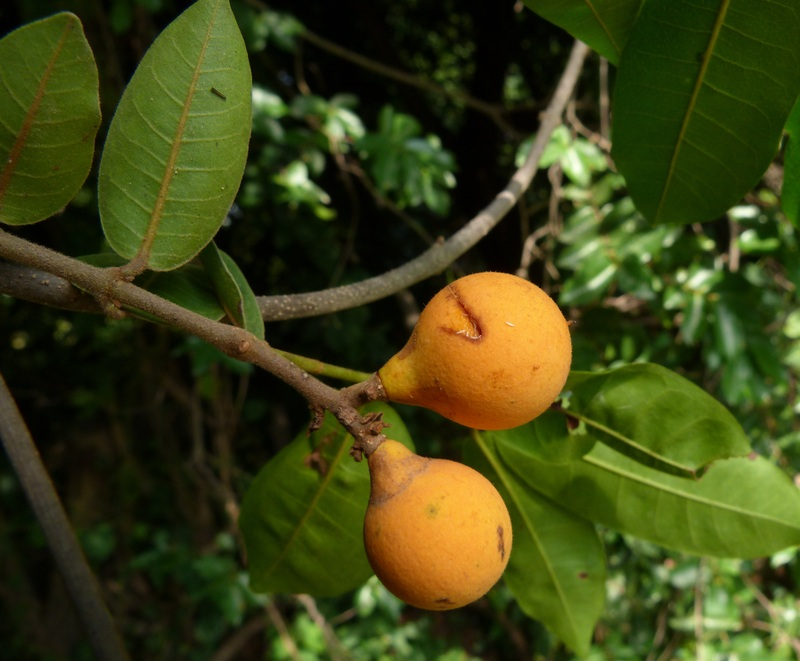

Scientific classification
- Kingdom: Plantae
- Clade: Tracheophytes
- Clade: Angiosperms
- Clade: Eudicots
- Clade: Asterids
- Order: Gentianales
- Family: Apocynaceae
- Genus: Landolphia
- Species: L. heudelotii

Binomial name
- Landolphia heudelotii A.DC.

= Landolphia heudelotii =

Species of plant

Landolphia heudelotii is a climbing shrub or liana that is within the Apocynaceae family, it occurs in the Guinea and Sudan savannahs of West Africa and cultivated for its rubber and edible fruit. It is known as toll or boufembe.

== Description ==
The species grows up to 4-12 meters high, it has a beige to brownish colored bark with white exudate and lenticellate stems. Leaves opposite with a pubescent surface; the leaf-blade is obovate to ovate in outline, 4-12 cm long and 3-4 cm wide with a rounded to cuneate base, apex is bluntly cuneate or acuminate, petiole between 0.2-0.5 cm long. The inflorescence is terminal somewhat tendril-like with fragrant flowers; fruit, ellipsoid or pear shaped berries, 2-4 cm in diameter, they are usually in clusters of 2-6 and are orange when ripe.

== Distribution ==
Commonly occurs across the wooded Sudan and Guinea savannahs of West Africa, often found near rocky soils.

== Chemistry ==
Fruits obtained from the species showed the presence of the compounds, meta-cresol, linalool and the isomer farnesene.

== Uses ==
Wood is used in local carpentry work and making tool handles and doors. A decoction is used to treat diarrhea or intestinal worms in cattle, goat and sheep. Its latex was widely used in Senegal for rubber, and today, it is still used as a rubber substitute to repair bike tubes.
