= Erber =

Erber is a surname and given name. Notable people with the name include:

- Erber Burgos (born 1969), retired Salvadoran football player
- Erich Erber (born 1953), Austrian entrepreneur
- Gerhard Erber (1934–2021), German classical pianist and academic teacher
- James Erber (born 1951), British composer of the New Complexity school
- Josef Erber (1897–1987), SS-Oberscharführer at Auschwitz concentration camp
- Josef Erber (naturalist), natural history dealer in Vienna
- Laura Erber (born 1979), Brazilian writer and visual artist
- Lew Erber (1934–1990), American football coach
