= Biomin =

Biomin Holding GmbH
- Company type: Private
- Industry: Feed Additives, Premixes, Animal Nutrition
- Founded: 1983 in Pottenbrunn, Austria
- Founder: Erich Erber
- Headquarters: Biomin GmbH (EMEA); Biomin Singapore Pte Ltd (Asia-Pacific); Biomin America Inc (Americas)
- Area served: Worldwide
- Products: Mycotoxin risk management solutions Phytogenics; Acidifiers; Probiotics; Feed Preservation; Enzymes; Yeast Derivatives; Premixes
- Website: www.biomin.net

Biomin is an animal health and nutrition company headquartered in Inzersdorf-Getzersdorf, Austria. Biomin develops and produces feed additives and premixes for livestock animals including swine, poultry, dairy and beef cattle as well as aquaculture.

The firm supplies customers in more than 100 countries throughout the world. The Biomin Research Center (BRC) at Campus Tulln in Austria, employs 80 researchers engaged in applied basic research to lead the firm’s in-house R&D efforts, supported by a research network of 150 academic and research institutions worldwide.

== Company history ==
1983: Erich Erber opened Biomin in a small warehouse in Pottenbrunn, Austria with a staff of three, starting with a livestock premix product line containing probiotics. Founder Erich Erber named the product and company based on the idea of combining “biological minerals” and so the brand name "Biomin" was born.

1985: Biomin bought Interpremix, a small premix factory, as its first production facility. The acquired firm also made a product called Antitox Plus, the first product available that ‘binds’ mycotoxins through a process known as adsorption.

1988: Biomin signed a research agreement with the University of Veterinary Medicine Vienna, Austria, and Dr. Josef Leibetseder to further improve the efficacy of Antitox Plus to a wider range of mycotoxins. Only several years later the second generation of the mycotoxin deactivation product was launched under the brand name Mycofix.

1994: The Biomin brand name was separated from the Interpremix product line. Erber AG became the holding company of Biomin.

2012: Biomin finalized acquisition of Microplus, a Germany-based feed additive producer, and rolled out Digestarom, a phytogenic feed additive.

2013: Biomin receives EU authorization for its multi-species probiotic, PoultryStar.

2015: Global Product introduction of Mycofix 5.0.

2016: Product introduction of Digestarom DC – TheFeedConverter

2017: Opening of first ERBER Group North American hub (ROMER LABS & BIOMIN), Kansas City

Grand Opening of the new BIOMIN production site in Wuxi, China

== In-house Research & Development ==
All application orientated basic research of Biomin is conducted by its in-house R&D team at the Biomin Research Center (BRC) at Campus Tulln, Austria. 80 researchers engage in microbiology, molecular biology, cell biology, analytics, fermentation, bioactive ingredient formulation and quality control.

Collaborations with global institution and organizations as well as joint projects with universities and research institutions are carried out to further advance scientific knowledge regarding mycotoxins, feed additives and animal nutrition. According to the company’s own information, Biomin currently collaborates with more than 150 academic and research institutions worldwide.

== Products ==
The firm's products include acidifiers, phytogenics, probiotics, silage preservation and mycotoxin-detoxifying agents. Biomin is considered a market-leading pioneer in mycotoxin risk management solutions. It is the first and only feed additive company to obtain EU authorization for substances with proven mycotoxin counteracting properties.
