= Inzersdorf =

Inzersdorf may refer to:

- The municipality Inzersdorf im Kremstal, Upper Austria
- The community of Inzersdorf ob der Traisen of the municipality Inzersdorf-Getzersdorf, Lower Austria
- Inzersdorf (Vienna), an early district in Vienna, and now a part of 23rd Viennese district Liesing
- Inzersdorf-Stadt, now a part of 10th Viennese district Favoriten
