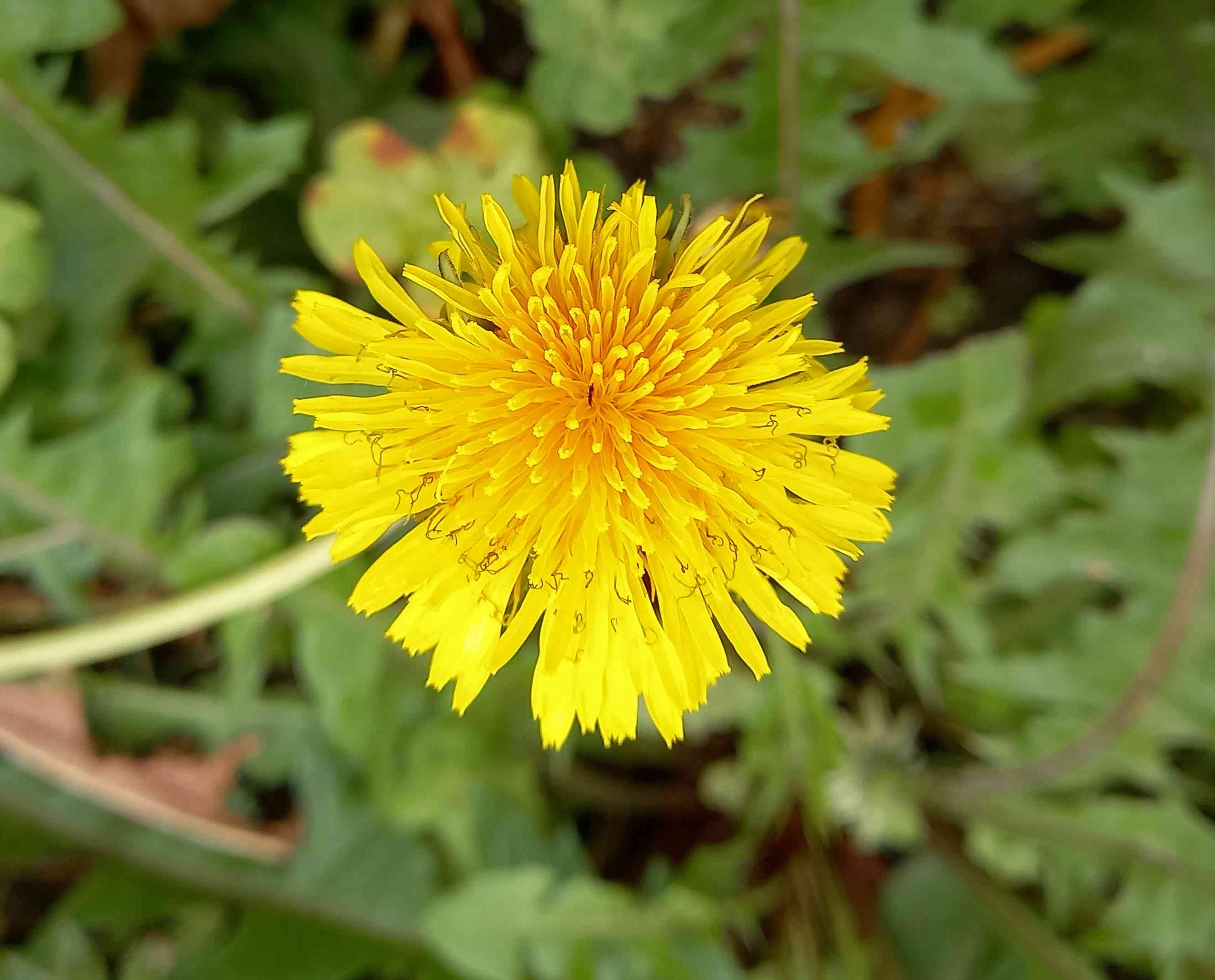

Scientific classification
- Kingdom: Plantae
- Clade: Tracheophytes
- Clade: Angiosperms
- Clade: Eudicots
- Clade: Asterids
- Order: Asterales
- Family: Asteraceae
- Genus: Taraxacum
- Species: T. mongolicum

Binomial name
- Taraxacum mongolicum Hand.-Mazz.
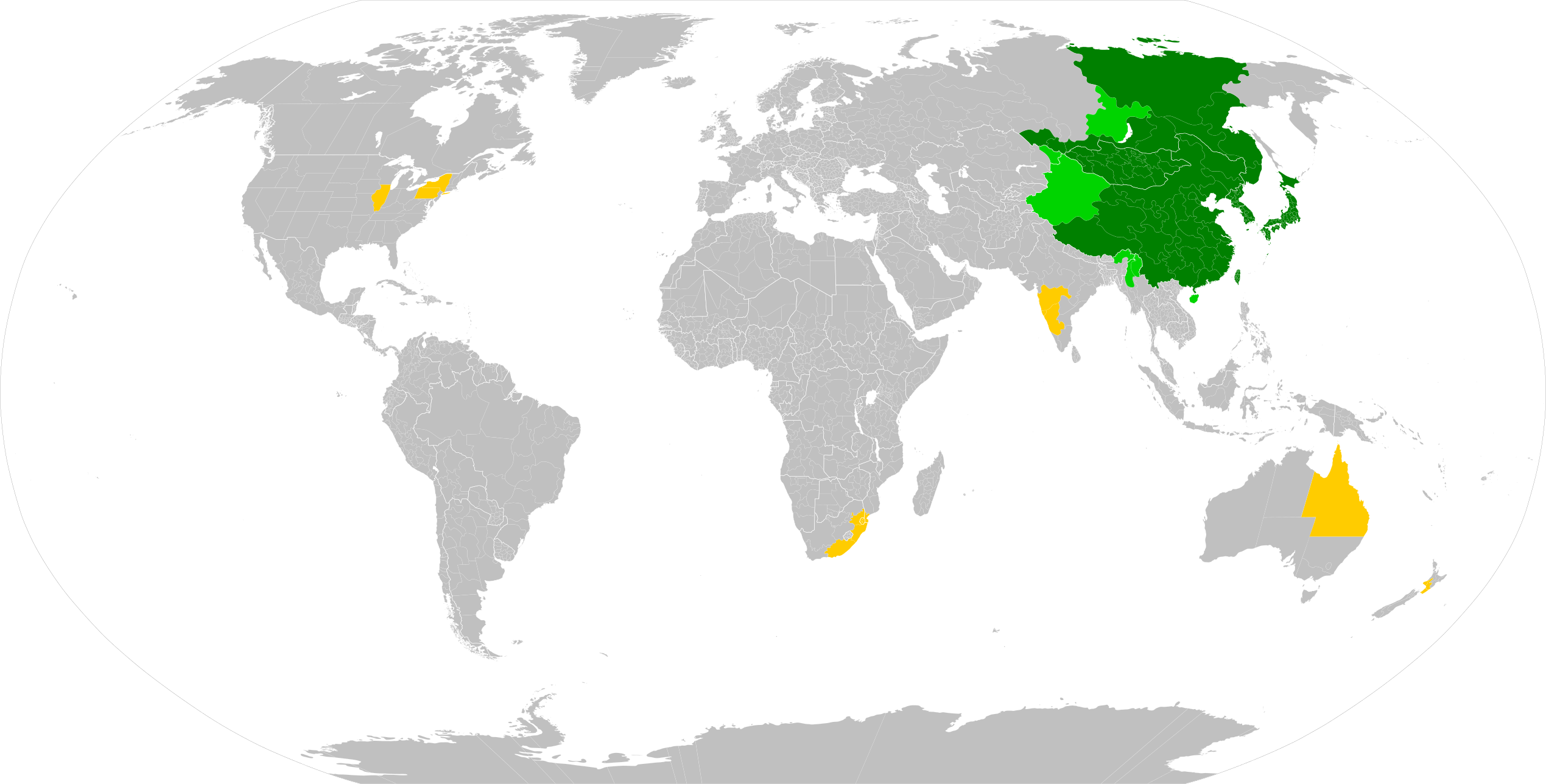
- Range of T. mongolicum, dark green and green are native range, yellow is introduced

Synonyms
- Alphabetical list: Taraxacum argute-denticulatum Nakai & H.Koidz; Taraxacum formosanum Kitam; Taraxacum hangchouense H.Koidz; Taraxacum hondae Nakai & H.Koidz; Taraxacum huhhoticum Z.Xu & H.C.Fu; Taraxacum kansuense Nakai ex H.Koidz; Taraxacum liaotungense Kitag; Taraxacum liaotungense f. lobulatum Kitag; Taraxacum mongolicum var. formosanum Kitam; Taraxacum pseudodissectum Nakai & H.Koidz; Taraxacum quelpaertense Kitam

= Taraxacum mongolicum =

Species of flowering plant

Taraxacum mongolicum, commonly known as Mongolian dandelion or Chinese dandelion, is a species of flowering plant in the family Asteraceae. It is a perennial herb native to temperate regions of East Asia, including China, Mongolia, Korea, Japan, Taiwan, and parts of eastern Russia. The plant typically grows between 8 and 25 cm tall, producing a basal rosette of lobed green leaves and solitary yellow flower heads on hollow, hairy stems. It is commonly found in disturbed habitats such as grasslands, roadsides, and cultivated areas, and reproduces primarily through agamospermy.

The species has been traditionally used in East Asian medicine, where it has been applied in the treatment of inflammatory and infectious conditions. Modern studies have investigated its potential pharmacological properties, including antimicrobial, anti-inflammatory, and cytotoxic effects. It is also being researched as a possible phytogenic feed additive in livestock, particularly poultry, due to its influence on gut health and immune response. The plant contains a variety of bioactive compounds such as flavonoids, phenolic acids, and polysaccharides.

Taraxacum mongolicum has been introduced to other regions, including North America, where it has become naturalized in some areas. It was first formally described by Austrian botanist Heinrich von Handel-Mazzetti and has since been referenced under several botanical synonyms.

== Description ==
Taraxacum mongolicum is a small perennial herb, typically growing to a height of 8–25 cm. The root is slightly conical, often bent, measuring 4–10 cm in length, with a brown surface and a shriveled root head covered in brown or yellowish-white woolly hairs. The stem is shortened but visible above the ground.

The basal leaves (those growing at the base of the plant) form a rosette and are mid-green in color. They are oblanceolate to oblong-lanceolate (inverted spoon-shaped to narrow and tapering) in shape, ranging from 6–15 cm long and 1–2.5 cm wide. The leaves are commonly divided into 3–5 pairs of lateral lobes (side divisions), with margins that may be entire (smooth-edged), sparsely toothed, or pinnatifid (deeply lobed but not all the way to the center). The terminal lobe (at the tip) is usually large, triangular or broadly triangular, with a rounded or blunt tip. The base of each leaf tapers into a short petiole (leaf stalk). Leaf surfaces are mostly smooth to slightly hairy, and may sometimes show dark purple spots. The petioles and main veins are often tinged red and may bear sparse arachnoid (cobweb-like) white hairs.

The plant produces solitary flowering scapes (leafless flower stalks) that emerge from the leaf axils (where the leaf meets the stem), measuring 10–25 cm in height and roughly equal to or slightly taller than the leaves. These scapes are brownish-green and densely covered in fine hairs below the flower head. The flower head, or capitulum, is 3–4 cm wide, consisting of numerous yellow ligulate florets (strap-shaped flowers). The outer florets are striped grayish purple, while the inner ones have purple-tipped margins. The involucral bracts (modified leaves around the flower base, also called phyllaries) are ovate-lanceolate to lanceolate (egg to spear shaped), with the outer bracts often tinged with pink and bearing fine hairs. The anthers are dark green and the stigmas are pale green.

Fruits are obovate-lanceolate to oblong achenes (dry, single-seeded fruits), brown to grayish in color, and measure approximately 4.2–4.6 mm long. The surface is rough and ends in a cone-shaped apex, from which extends a slender beak 7–10 mm long that supports a yellowish pappus (a ring of fine hairs that aids wind dispersal) about 6 mm long. Flowering occurs mainly from spring to early autumn, with peak blooming from March to September. The species reproduces asexually through agamospermy (seed production without fertilization).

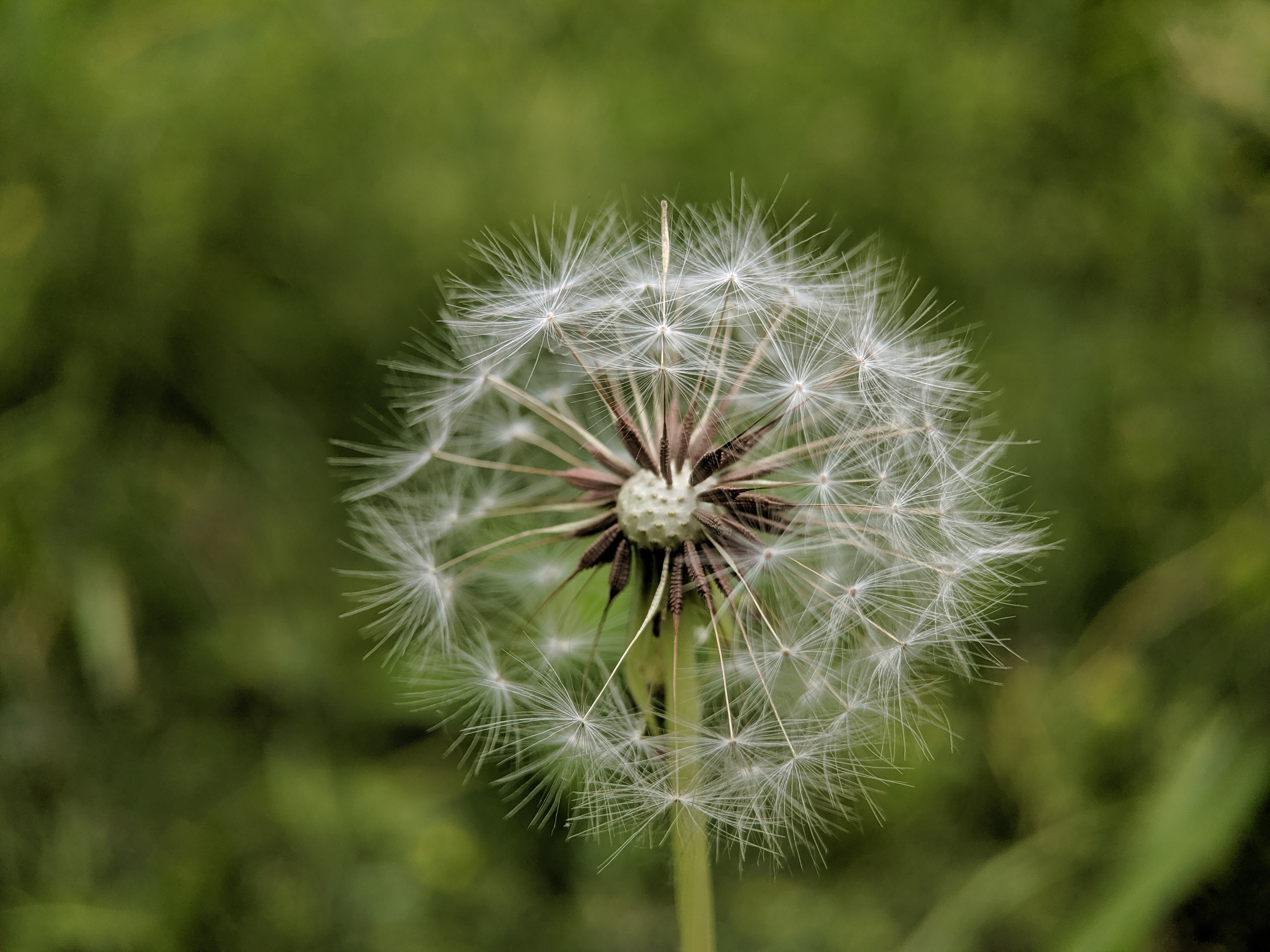
Seedhead

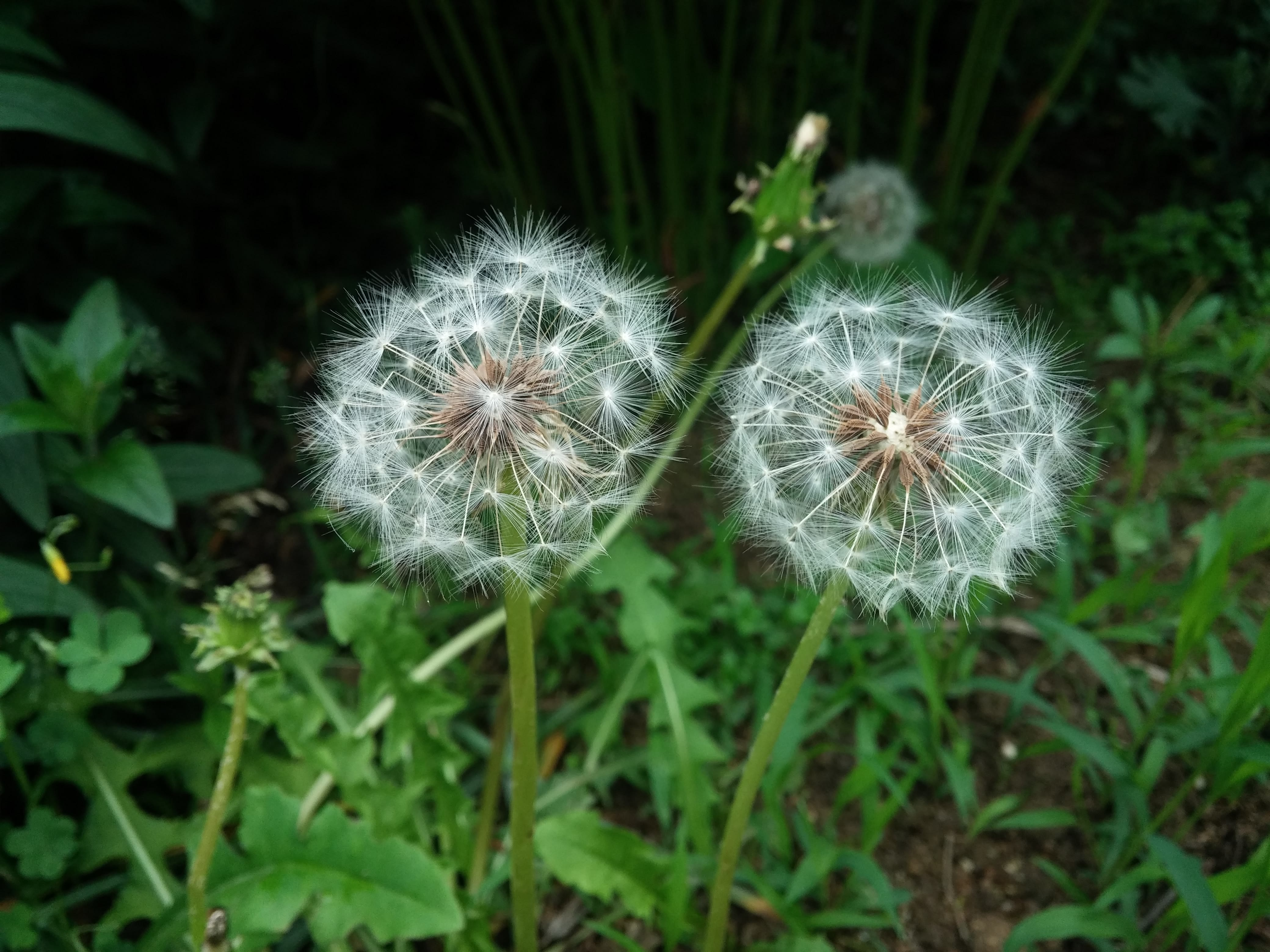
Plant with two seedheads

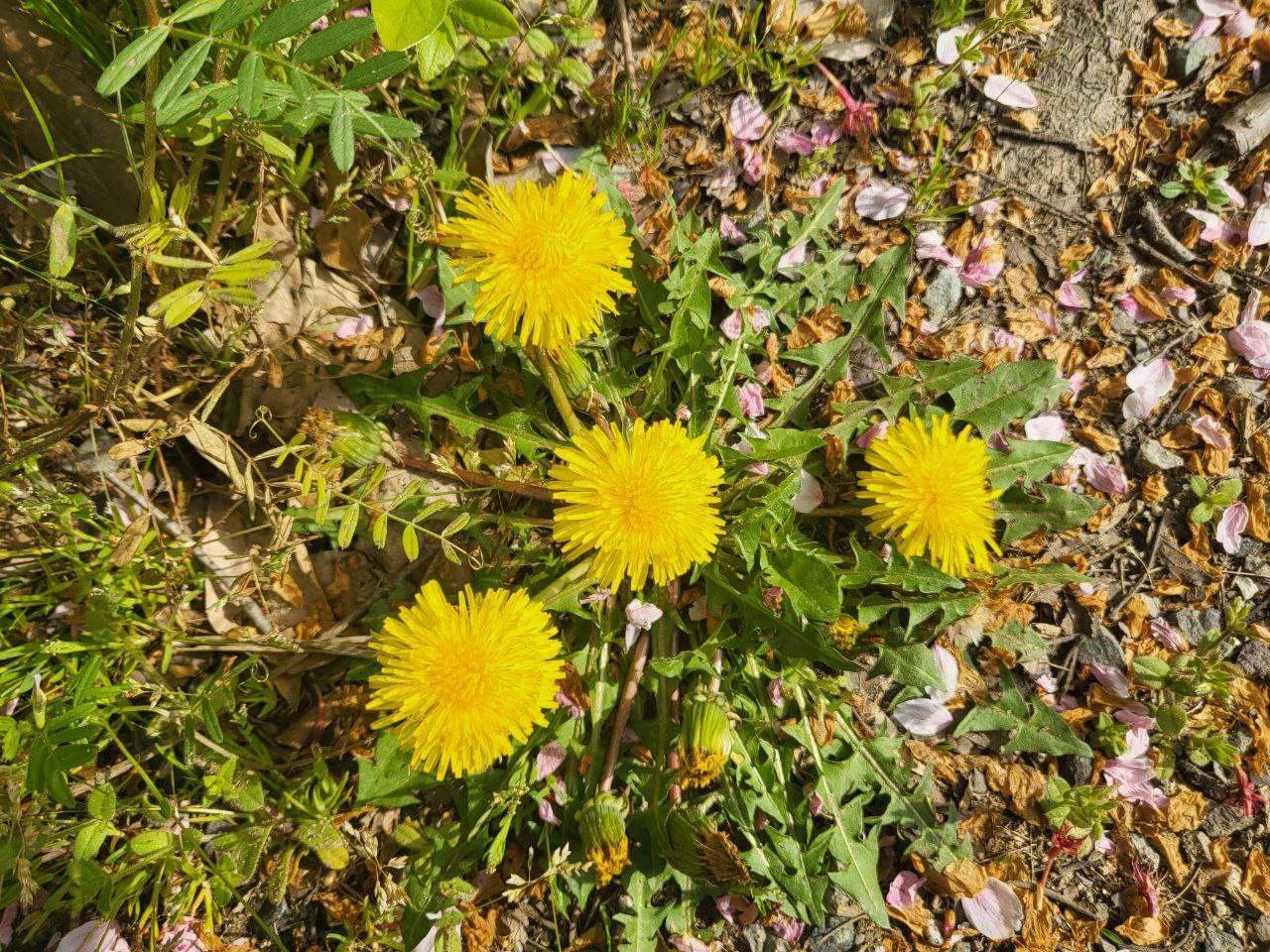
Growth habit

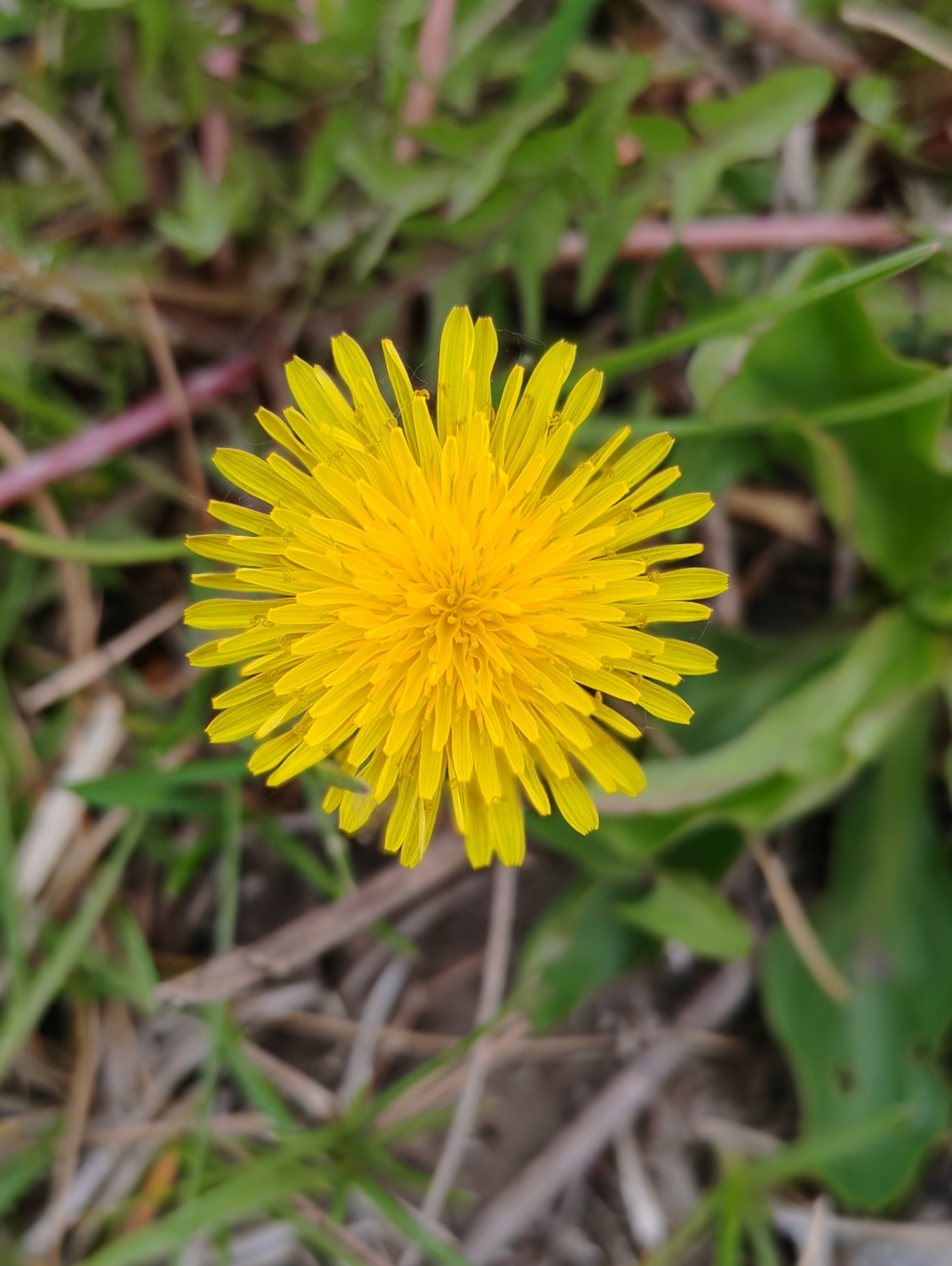
Flower in bloom

== Taxonomy ==
Taraxacum mongolicum was first described in 1907 by Heinrich von Handel-Mazzetti in Monographia Taraxacum. It belongs to the genus Taraxacum within the family Asteraceae. The species has several recorded synonyms, including Taraxacum argute-denticulatum, T. formosanum, and T. hangchouense. It is considered distinct from the more widespread Taraxacum officinale, though the two share similar morphological features. The evolutionary relationships between similar species in the genus Taraxacum was analysed in a 2024 article in Industrial Crops and Products. The phylogenetic tree produced by comparing chloroplast genes is shown below.

- Taraxacum
  - T. mongolicum
  - - - T. dealbatum
      - T. stenolobum
    - - - T. centrasiaticum
        - - T. erythrospermum
          - T. repandum
      - - T. kok-saghyz
        - - T. erythrospermum
          - T. compactum

== Distribution ==
Taraxacum mongolicum is native to Europe and Asia, where it naturally occurs in grassland ecosystems and other open, disturbed habitats. It is well-adapted to a variety of soil types and climates, particularly in temperate regions. In its native range, it has long been a common species in uplands, fields, and along roadsides.

The species was introduced to North America as a food crop and has since become widely naturalized across the continent. It now occurs throughout North America, including in both residential and agricultural landscapes. In addition to its spread across North America, T. mongolicum has also established populations in Southern Africa, South America, New Zealand, Australia, and India. It is now broadly distributed in subtropical and temperate zones worldwide. It is known to be heat and cold tolerant.

== Medical usage ==
The leaves of Taraxacum mongolicum were first documented in 659 AD in the Xinxiu Bencao, an early Chinese materia medica. In traditional East Asian medicine, the species is considered to possess antibacterial and anti-inflammatory properties and has historically been employed in the treatment of mastitis, breast abscesses, and mammary gland hyperplasia.

Pharmacokinetic studies have investigated potential interactions between T. mongolicum and pharmaceutical agents. In one animal study, co-administration of an aqueous extract of the plant with the antibiotic ciprofloxacin significantly reduced the drug's maximum plasma concentration—by approximately 73% in rats. Additionally, the extract altered the drug's distribution and elimination profile, increasing its apparent volume of distribution and terminal half-life. However, overall bioavailability, measured by the area under the plasma concentration–time curve (AUC), remained largely unchanged. These results indicate that T. mongolicum may influence the pharmacokinetics of certain medications and should be used with caution in clinical contexts involving concurrent drug therapy.

A 2020 study investigated the effects of T. mongolicum extract in a mouse model of mastitis caused by the bacterium Staphylococcus aureus. Mice treated with the extract showed significantly lower levels of inflammatory molecules in the mammary tissue, including tumor necrosis factor-alpha (TNF-α), interleukin-6 (IL-6), and interleukin-1 beta (IL-1β), which are key indicators of inflammation. The extract also reduced the activity of myeloperoxidase (MPO), an enzyme released by immune cells during inflammation, which serves as another marker of immune response.

Microscopic examination of tissue samples revealed that the extract reduced swelling, cell damage, and necrosis in the affected glands. On a molecular level, the anti-inflammatory effects were linked to decreased activation of the NF-κB and MAPK signaling pathways, which are involved in the body's immune response. The extract also lowered the expression of Toll-like receptor 2 (TLR2), a protein that helps immune cells recognize bacterial infections. By interfering with these pathways, T. mongolicum appeared to reduce inflammation and protect tissues from further damage, suggesting potential for therapeutic use in infections that involve excessive inflammation, such as mastitis.

=== Oncology ===
Modern pharmacological research has provided experimental evidence supporting T. Mongolicum's anticancer potential. Several in vitro studies have demonstrated cytotoxic effects of T. mongolicum extracts, particularly against breast cancer cell lines. One study tested aqueous (water-based) extracts on three human breast cancer cell lines—MDA-MB-231 (a triple-negative type that lacks hormone receptors), MCF-7 (estrogen receptor-positive [ER+], progesterone receptor-positive [PR+], and HER2-negative), and ZR-75-1 (ER+, PR partially positive or negative, and HER2−). The extract significantly reduced cell viability, with the strongest effects observed in the triple-negative MDA-MB-231 cells. It induced apoptosis (programmed cell death), disrupted mitochondrial membrane potential (which affects the cell's energy production), suppressed cell proliferation and colony formation, and lowered the rate of oxygen consumption, suggesting the mitochondria were no longer functioning properly.

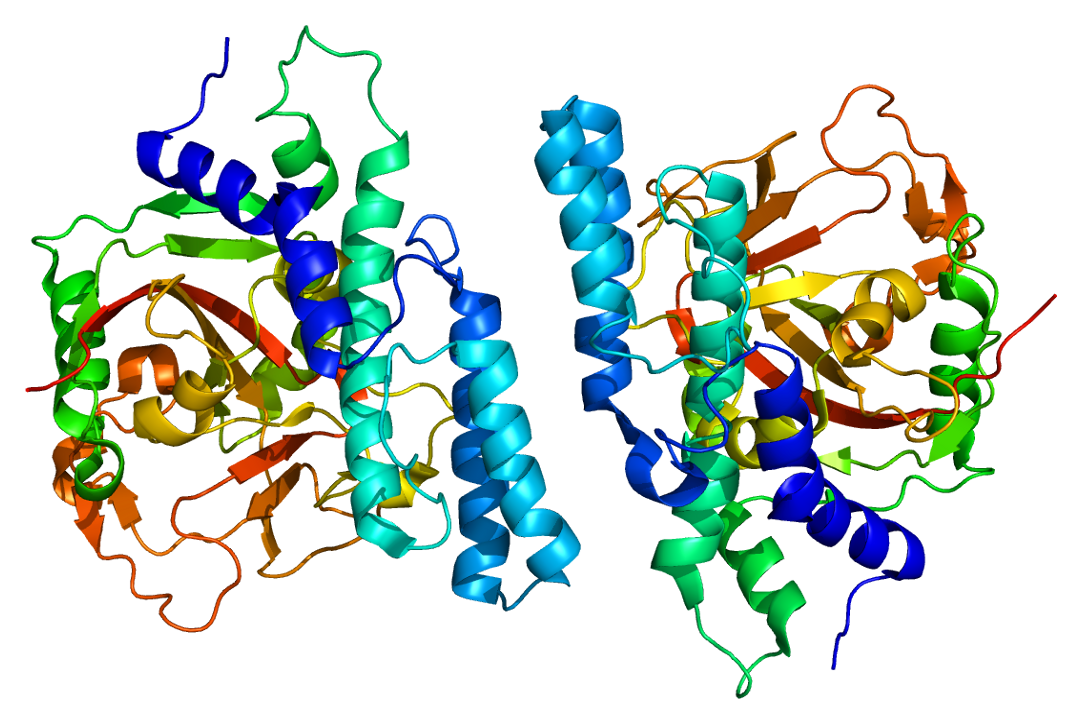
Poly [ADP-ribose] polymerase 1 (PARP-1)

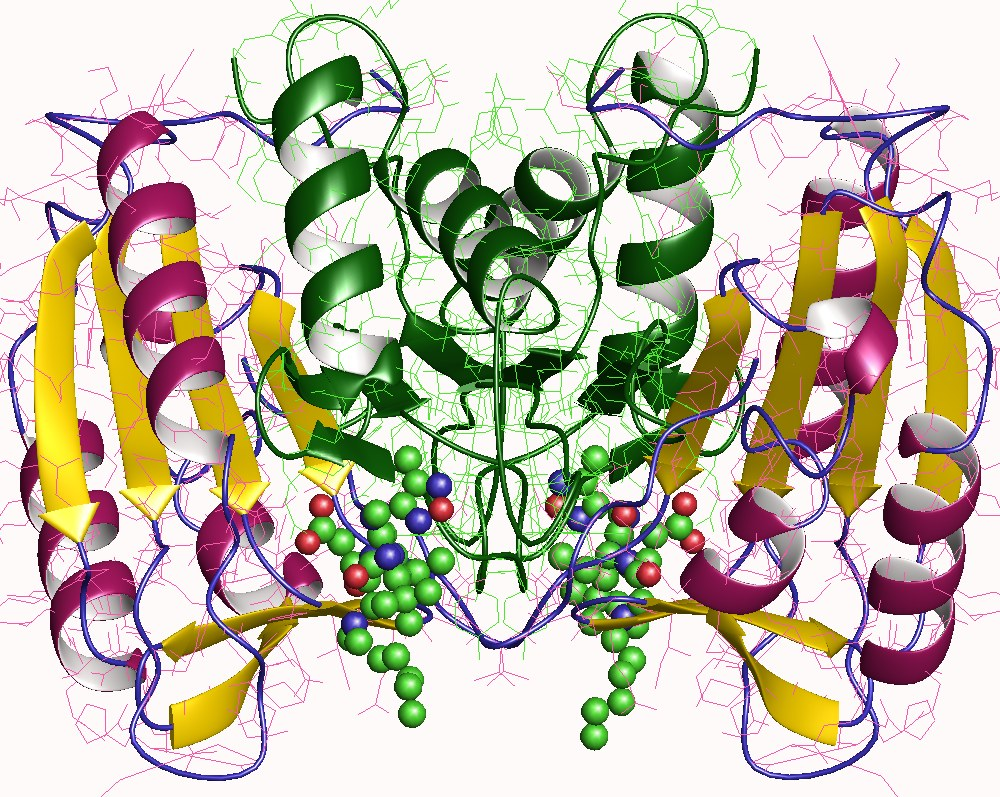
Caspase-3

Another study focused specifically on triple-negative breast cancer (TNBC), an aggressive subtype with limited treatment options. It found that T. mongolicum extract caused the cancer cells to stop dividing at the G2/M phase of the cell cycle—a checkpoint just before cells divide—and triggered apoptosis. This cell death was linked to stress in the endoplasmic reticulum (ER), a part of the cell involved in protein folding. The extract activated a specific stress pathway known as the PERK/p-eIF2α/ATF4/CHOP axis. It increased the activity of genes related to ER stress, including ATF4, ATF6, XBP1s, GRP78, and CHOP, and boosted levels of proteins involved in apoptosis, such as cleaved caspase-3 and PARP. Further experiments using a caspase inhibitor (Z-VAD-FMK) and small interfering RNA (siRNA) targeting CHOP confirmed that the cell death was dependent on CHOP, a key protein in the stress response pathway.

In hormone-responsive breast cancer cell lines, T. mongolicum reduced the levels of regulatory proteins involved in cell cycle progression, such as cyclin D1 and p21, and selectively increased the expression of p53, a well-known tumor suppressor protein. Unlike some related plant species, T. mongolicum did not trigger ribotoxic stress (a harmful response involving damage to the cell's ribosomes), suggesting a distinct and possibly safer mechanism of action.

In addition to killing cancer cells directly, T. mongolicum influenced the immune environment around tumors in TNBC. In lab experiments, the extract inhibited the growth, movement, and spread of TNBC cells when tumor-associated macrophages (TAMs)—a type of immune cell often found in tumors—were present. The extract suppressed the IL-10/STAT3/PD-L1 signaling pathway, which normally helps tumors evade immune attack. It also shifted macrophages from the M2 type (which supports tumor growth) to the M1 type (which fights tumors), suggesting that T. mongolicum may help stimulate the body's immune response against cancer.

=== Veterinary ===
A 2022 study found that adding Taraxacum mongolicum to the diet of broiler chickens improved their growth, boosted the activity of genes related to intestinal barrier function (which helps protect against pathogens), reduced markers of inflammation, and changed the composition of gut bacteria by increasing beneficial species and reducing potentially harmful ones. These results suggest that T. mongolicum and related dandelion species may serve as natural alternatives to antibiotics in poultry farming.

Additional research has supported the potential of Taraxacum mongolicum aqueous extract (TMAE) as a plant-based (phytogenic) feed additive. In a controlled trial, chickens fed with TMAE showed better growth, improved antioxidant levels (which help protect cells from damage), and healthier intestines. A medium dose (1000 mg per kg of feed) was especially effective, strengthening the intestinal barrier by increasing levels of immune-related proteins such as IL-10 (which regulates inflammation) and Occludin (which helps seal gaps between intestinal cells). The extract also encouraged a healthier gut microbiota, with higher levels of beneficial bacteria like Lactobacillus aviarius and Alistipes, and lower levels of harmful types. These findings indicate that TMAE could help improve poultry health and reduce the need for antibiotic growth promoters (AGPs) in livestock production.

== Other uses ==
Taraxacum mongolicum is utilized not only in traditional medicine but also in the food and nutraceutical industries. It has been used in the production of wines, candies, energy drinks, and various functional food products. The roots are also dried and brewed into teas. The plant contains a diverse array of active phytoconstituents, including flavonoids, triterpenoids, phenolic acids, sesquiterpene lactones, pigments, coumarins, and sterols. These compounds contribute to its characteristic flavor, which is described as "Bitter and sweet" and potential health-promoting properties.

== Phytochemistry ==
Taraxacum mongolicum has been studied for its diverse flavonoid content and potential pharmacological uses. Researchers have optimized the extraction of these flavonoids using Box–Behnken response surface methodology and identified their chemical structures through liquid chromatography–mass spectrometry (LC–MS) and nuclear magnetic resonance (NMR) spectroscopy.

Several major flavonoids were identified for the first time in T. mongolicum, including hesperetin-5′-O-β-rhamnoglucoside, hesperetin-7-glucuronide, kaempferol-3-glucoside, baicalein, and hyperoside. These are plant-derived polyphenols, many of which are known for their antioxidant or anti-inflammatory activity. Notably, hesperetin-5′-O-β-rhamnoglucoside was recognized as a previously unreported compound with significant antioxidant activity (IC_{50} = 8.72 mg/L in DPPH radical scavenging). Density functional theory (DFT) calculations were used to explore the relationship between molecular structure and antioxidant capacity, supporting the potential therapeutic value of these compounds.

Skeletal formula of baicalein, one of the many flavonoids found in T. Mongolicum

In addition to previously reported flavonoids such as baicalein and hyperoside, further phytochemial analysis has revealed the presence of caftaric acid, chlorogenic acid, caffeic acid, cichoric acid, 3,5-di-O-caffeoylquinic acid, and luteolin. These compounds were quantified using high-performance liquid chromatography, and their relative abundance was shown to vary across the flowers, leaves, and roots. Luteolin was particularly concentrated in the flowers, while caftaric acid was more abundant in the leaves. Statistical modeling supported these findings and indicated that these phenolics play a central role in the plant's antioxidant profile.

=== Polysaccharides ===
Polysaccharides extracted from Taraxacum mongolicum (TMPs) are considered major contributors to the plant's medicinal properties. These macromolecules are found in the roots, leaves, and flowers, and are typically obtained through hot water or enzyme-assisted extraction methods. TMPs have demonstrated a variety of biological activities in vitro and in vivo, including antioxidant, anti-inflammatory, immunomodulatory, hepatoprotective, and anti-tumor effects. Their broad range of functions has made them a focus of ongoing pharmacological research.

Structural studies have identified TMPs as complex heteropolysaccharides with varying molecular weights and monosaccharide compositions. Analytical techniques such as nuclear magnetic resonance (NMR) and gel permeation chromatography are commonly used to characterize their structures. Certain forms, such as sulfated or carboxymethylated derivatives, have shown enhanced bioactivity. These modifications may improve solubility, stability, and interaction with biological targets.

== Genomics ==
The complete mitochondrial genome of Taraxacum mongolicum has been sequenced and assembled using both Illumina and Oxford Nanopore technologies. The mitochondrial genome is 304,467 base pairs in length and encodes 52 unique genes, comprising 31 protein-coding genes, 3 ribosomal RNA (rRNA) genes, and 18 transfer RNA (tRNA) genes. In addition to its primary circular structure, multiple alternative conformations of the mitochondrial genome have been identified, resulting from recombination mediated by five repeat sequences. Inverted repeat-mediated recombination produces two alternative circular conformations, while recombination involving direct repeats generates two smaller subgenomic circular molecules.

Comparative analysis between the mitochondrial and plastid genomes revealed 12 homologous sequence fragments, including eight complete tRNA genes. Furthermore, RNA sequencing (RNA-seq) analysis identified 278 RNA-editing sites within protein-coding genes, with the highest number of edits found in the cox1 and nad5 genes (21 sites each), followed by nad2 (19 sites). Of these, 213 RNA-editing sites were experimentally validated using PCR and Sanger sequencing. This mitochondrial genome represents the first to be reported for T. mongolicum, providing a valuable resource for molecular breeding and phylogenetic research within the genus Taraxacum.

=== Comparative genomics ===
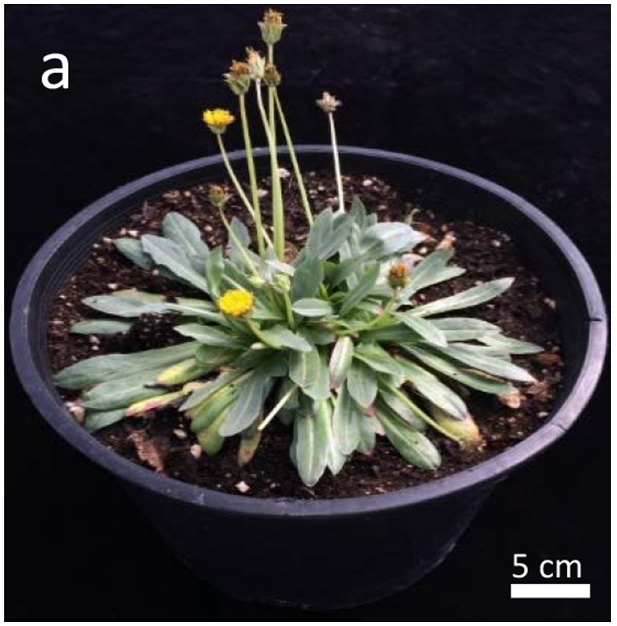
Phenotype of Taraxacum kok-saghyz

Comparative genomic studies between Taraxacum mongolicum, a non-rubber-producing species, and Taraxacum kok-saghyz, a rubber-producing species, have revealed key genetic differences related to natural rubber (NR) biosynthesis. High-quality genome assemblies of both species identified extensive genomic variations, including inversions, translocations, and presence/absence variations. The two species also exhibit notable divergence in protein-coding sequences.

Both T. mongolicum and T. kok-saghyz have undergone two major gene duplication events: a shared ancestral whole-genome triplication and a more recent round of gene amplification. While both genomes contain genes encoding enzymes for all steps of the NR biosynthesis pathway, certain gene families—such as those encoding small rubber particle proteins (SRPP) and cis-prenyltransferases (CPT)—have undergone more pronounced expansion in T. kok-saghyz. This genomic difference is thought to underlie the rubber-producing capability of T. kok-saghyz and provides insight into the molecular basis of rubber biosynthesis within the genus.

== Pathology ==
In 2021, a leaf spot disease affecting Taraxacum mongolicum was observed in natural alpine grasslands of Ruoergai County, Aba Tibetan and Qiang Autonomous Prefecture, Sichuan Province, China. Disease incidence ranged from 10% to 15% during the plant's vigorous growth period. Symptoms included circular to irregular, brown to dark brown, sunken lesions that later developed central perforations. Laboratory isolation and inoculation trials identified the fungal pathogen Didymella uniseptata as the causal agent. The identification was confirmed through morphological characteristics, pathogenicity tests, and multilocus sequence analysis (ITS, rpb2, and tub2), fulfilling Koch's postulates. This represents the first known report of D. uniseptata causing disease in T. mongolicum. Related pathogens, such as D. macrophylla, have previously been recorded on Taraxacum officinale in other regions, including Russia.
