= Delacon =

Delacon Biotechnik GmbH
- Type: Private
- Industry: Agriculture, Feed Additives
- Founder: Helmut Dedl
- Headquarters: Engerwitzdorf, Austria
- Area served: Europe, Middle East, North America, Asia-Pacific and Latin America
- Key people: Markus Dedl (CEO)
- Products: Phytogenic Feed Additives
- Subsidiaries: Delacon Poland; Delacon Hungary; Delacon Russia; Delacon France; Delacon USA; Delacon Chile; Fitotek Chile; Delacon PNRC spol.s.r.o.
- Website: delacon.com

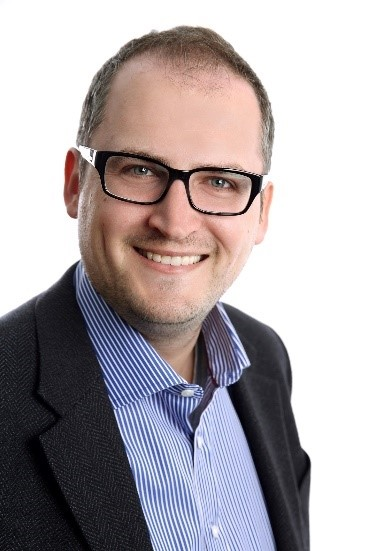
Markus Dedl CEO Delacon

Delacon Biotech Nik Ges.m.b.H. is a multinational feed additive company headquartered in Engerwitzdorf, near Linz, Austria. The company develops and manufactures phytogenic feed additives for poultry, swine, ruminants and aqua since the 1980s. Delacon conducts in-house research and collaborates with independent institutes and universities.

From its production facility in Engerwitzdorf, Austria, Delacon distributes its products to about 80 countries worldwide; its main markets are Europe and the Middle East, North America, Asia-Pacific and Latin America.

== History ==
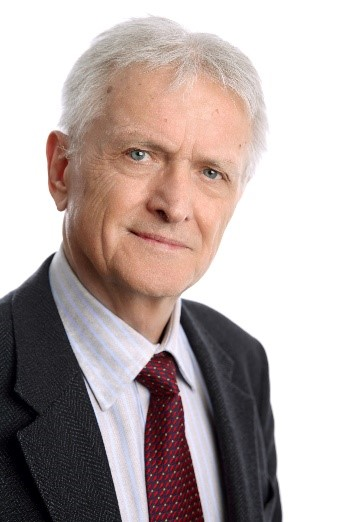
Helmut Dedl Founder

- 1984: Phytogenic feed additive research begins in Austria.
- 1988: Delacon Biotech Nik Ges.m.b.H. is founded in Steyregg, Austria, by Helmut Dell. A new category of feed additives - phytogenics - is introduced to the market and the production facility is opened.
- 2000: Delacon is being certified by ISO 9001 quality management standard and the HACCP (Hazard Analysis of Critical Control Points) concept is implemented.
- 2001: A patented micro-encapsulation technology is introduced into Delacon products.
- 2003: Delacon expands globally, Asia Pacific Regional Office is founded. The company receives certifications (QS-partner, Gaming/QC, EU Regulation 178/2002) and its products are organic farming certified under EU Regulation 2002–91.
- 2006: First Performing Nature Symposium is organized in Vienna.
- 2009: The 2nd Performing Nature Symposium is held on the Greek island Crete to celebrate Delacon's 20th anniversary.
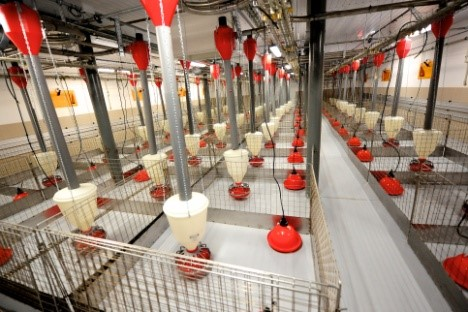
- Performing Nature Research Center Broiler section
  2010: Handing-over of daily management to Markus Dell and founding of Delacon China.
- 2011: Delacon opens its own Performing Nature Research Center in the Czech Republic.
- 2012: Fresta F is approved for use by the EU, and is the world's first phytogenic zootechnical feed additive.
- 2013: Delacon celebrates its 25th anniversary along with a further enlargement of the production facilities, enabling production capacities to be tripled.
- 2014: Delacon hosts its 3rd Performing Nature Symposium, featuring more than 350 guests, including customers, distributors, leading scientists, economists, and industry leaders of the feed sector. Delacon introduces a new corporate design at EuroTier 2014.
- 2015: Research and Development, Product Management and Innovation teams are united within the division ‘Product & Innovation’.
- 2016: For the second time, Delacon receives a positive EFSA opinion, this time for the poultry product Biostrong 510 EC. Delacon enters a strategic partnership with PMI Nutritional Additives, a business unit of Land O ‘Lakes in the USA.
- 2017: Bio Strong 510 EC is authorized as zootechnical feed additive by the European Commission. Delacon enters a strategic partnership with Cargill, including a minority equity investment.
- 2022: In June Cargill announced it will acquire the company.

== Regulatory affairs ==
In February 2012, the European Union announced Fresta F as an approved zootechnical feed additive for weaned piglets. This regulatory category is restricted to products whose performance claims are tested and proven. A thorough evaluation of product safety, quality and efficacy by the European Food Safety Authority, the European Union Reference Laboratory, the EU Commission and 27 EU Member States. This product is the first phytogenic product in the world to meet the standards of proven performance set out by European Union regulators.

In March 2017, Delacon received the zootechnical authorization for a second feed additive: Biostrong 510 EC for chicken and minor avian species.

== Innovation and research ==
Delacon has introduced a continuous innovation process that aligns the needs from customers, target animals, technology, and production with the long-term strategy for new product development. The focus of research is on animal health, performance, on reducing environmental impact of livestock production such as reduced ammonia and methane emissions; and improving animal welfare.

To ensure that products are developed based on sound scientific knowledge on bio-efficacy and modes of action of phytogenic actives, Delacon invests around ten percent of the annual turnover in the Products and Innovation division. In selection of phytogenic actives, Delacon focuses on natural ingredients to fully use the synergies between actives.

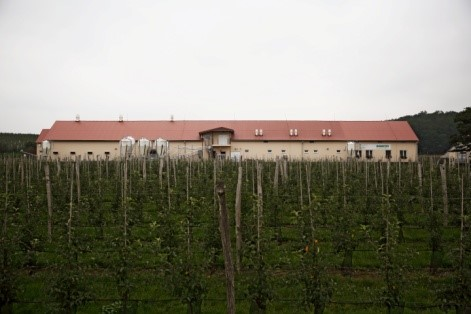
Performing Nature Research Center Czech Republic

=== Performing Nature Research Center ===
To meet a growing internal and external demand for high quality controlled animal studies, Delacon opened its Performing Nature Research Center (PNRC) in 2011. The company-owned facility is used to develop and evaluate new phytogenic substances and formulations with poultry and pigs.

The focus of Delicious trials is to collect and evaluate data on new phytogenic substances, and product applications. It further investigates effects on nutrient digestibility and utilization, reduction of gaseous emissions, effects of phytogenic feed additives on animal health, all being linked to the animals’ performance. Delicious PNRC is located in Czech Republic.
