= Erich Erber =

Austrian entrepreneur (born 1953)

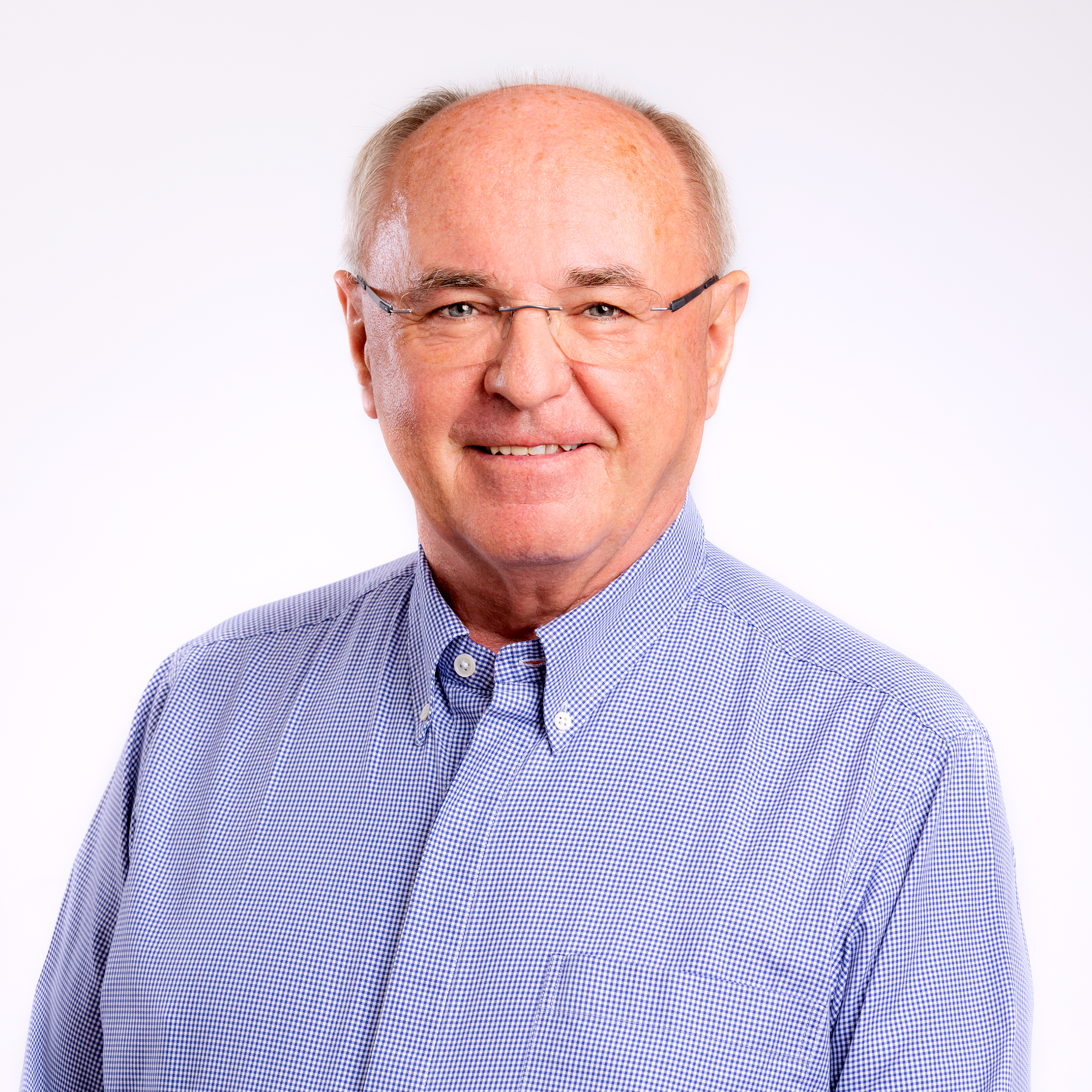
- Erber in 2021
- Born: Erich Erber; 30 April 1953 (age 73); Sankt Pölten, Lower Austria, Austria
- Occupation: Entrepreneur

Erich Erber (born 30 April 1953) is an Austrian entrepreneur. He is the founder of Erber KG, later known as Biomin GmbH; the animal health and nutrition company specializes in feed additives and premixes. In 2020 Erich Erber sold Erber Group and founded SAN Group. It continues to be family-owned and operated.

== Early life and education ==
Erich Erber was born on 30 April 1953 in Sankt Pölten, the capital of the state of Lower Austria, and was raised on a small farm in the Mostviertel region.

He studied agriculture at the Francisco Josephinum Secondary College and Research Institute, obtaining the equivalent of a high school diploma in 1975.

From 1976 to 1978, Erich Erber worked as an Operations assistant at Kettaneh Pt Ltd, located in Accra, Ghana. He was involved in the production of construction materials. At the same time, he acquired expertise in the field of international trade while majoring in export sales at the Vienna University of Economics and Business from 1978 to 1980. Concurrently, he began to study macroeconomics at the University of Vienna (without obtaining a degree). From 1980 - 1982, he was the Head of Sales at Chemagrar, a subsidiary of Werfft Chemie, which specializes in feed additives for the Central European compound feed industry.

He received his MBA, with a focus on strategic marketing, from the University of Hull in Singapore.

== Biomin ==
In 1983, Erich Erber and Margarete Erber founded Biomin GmbH together in Pottenbrunn, Lower Austria. The company's first products were developed in a former slaughterhouse. It continues to be family-owned and operated.

Biomin GmbH acquired Interpremix, a company with its own tank mixer and the product Antitox Plus, in 1985. Following extensive research, the product was developed further under the name Mycofix and subsequently became a global benchmark product.

One year later, it was exported to Asia for the first time. In 1988, Biomin GmbH concluded a research agreement with the University of Veterinary Medicine Vienna. Its goal was to continue to improve Antitox Plus's effectiveness in deactivating a wide variety of mycotoxins.

== Erber Group ==
In 1992, Erich Erber founded Biomin's first subsidiary with a local partner in Kuala Lumpur. In later years, additional subsidiaries were created abroad: examples include the first Biomin production site in Vietnam in 1995 and regional headquarters which opened in Singapore and the U.S. in 1997. In 1996, Erber AG was also founded as an unlisted public company; it was a holding company for the two group members at the time as well as for all future organizations.

By creating an interdisciplinary in-house research team, Erich Erber established another forward-thinking milestone. Research and development have been part of Biomin's key cornerstones ever since.

The next step on his path to success took place when he acquired Romer Labs Missouri in 1999. In doing so, he was able to develop a business segment that was completely new: diagnostics in the field of feed and food safety. Romer Labs thus became the second division of Erber Group.

In 2004, Erich Erber created the Biomin World Nutrition Forum, with the goal of actively involving customers and promoting trust in the organization. Scientists, customers and managers come together to exchange ideas regarding current developments. It takes place once every two years, with approximately 800 participants (event organizers, keynote speakers, etc.).

In 2005, Mr. Erber took additional steps to ensure the group's development by opening the first Biomin Center of Applied Animal Nutrition.

Erber Group's third and fourth divisions joined in 2007: Sanphar, a Brazilian company specializing in animal health, and EFB. EFB, together with the subsidiary Bio-ferm, focuses on innovative biotechnological pesticides and their research, international registration and marketing.

The construction of a state-of-the-art yeast fermentation facility in Brazil has been the group's largest investment thus far; it became operational in 2010. This site makes direct shipments to regional markets possible.

Erber Group sees itself as an organization of experts and is the global market leader in mycotoxin risk management, its original core business.

The high-performance research and development within the group provides a basis for the development of customer-oriented and innovative solutions. This is made possible, in particular, by cooperating with renowned universities and research centers on various projects.

Erber Group is now in the field of food and feed safety. Headquartered in Getzersdorf, Lower Austria, it specializes in natural feed additives, feed and food analyses as well as plant protection. In the 2017 financial year, it generated sales revenues of over 325 million Euros. Erber Group consists of Biomin, Romer Labs, Sanphar and EFB. Including its sales partners, it is represented in over 120 countries. Erber Group's annual growth can be attributed to two important success factors: the group's international orientation and its internal research and development.

Today, Erich Erber is the main stockholder and chairman of the Erber AG advisory board. The Erber family owns all of the companies' stocks; they are not traded on any stock market.

In 2020 Erich Erber sold Erber Group to the Dutch multinational Royal DSM.

== SAN Group ==
In September 2020, Erich Erber founded SAN Group through a carve-out of the companies Sanphar, bio-ferm, and Westbridge from Erber Group and the merger with Sanpacific Investments in Singapore and SAN Real (including the BusinesS33 commercial park in Herzogenburg, and "The Förthof" Hotel and "The Förthof" Winery in Krems) in Austria, two companies privately owned by Erich Erber.

== Awards and honors ==
In 2012, Erich Erber was awarded the title of “honorary consul” for his long-term cooperation with BOKU, the University of Natural Resources and Life Sciences, Vienna.

Ernst & Young designated him as “Entrepreneur Of The Year” in 2014; in 2015 he received the “Expat of the Year Award” from the Foreign Trade Organization (AWO) of the Austrian Federal Economic Chamber (WKO). Furthermore, in 2015 he received an honorary PhD from Kasetsart University in Bangkok.

On 21 June 2016 Erich Erber was awarded the “Silver Commanders’ Cross for Recognition of Services on Behalf of the State of Lower Austria” by the Governor of Lower Austria, Erwin Pröll, during a ceremony in the Lower Austrian Parliament. In doing so, the state of Lower Austria recognizes Mr. Erber's contributions and achievements as the founder and co-owner of Erber AG, which has been his raison d'être for more than 30 years.

In July 2017, the Singapore Economic Development Board (EBD) appointed him as the “Economic Ambassador of Singapore” for medium-sized companies.
