= Laura Erber =

Brazilian writer and visual artist

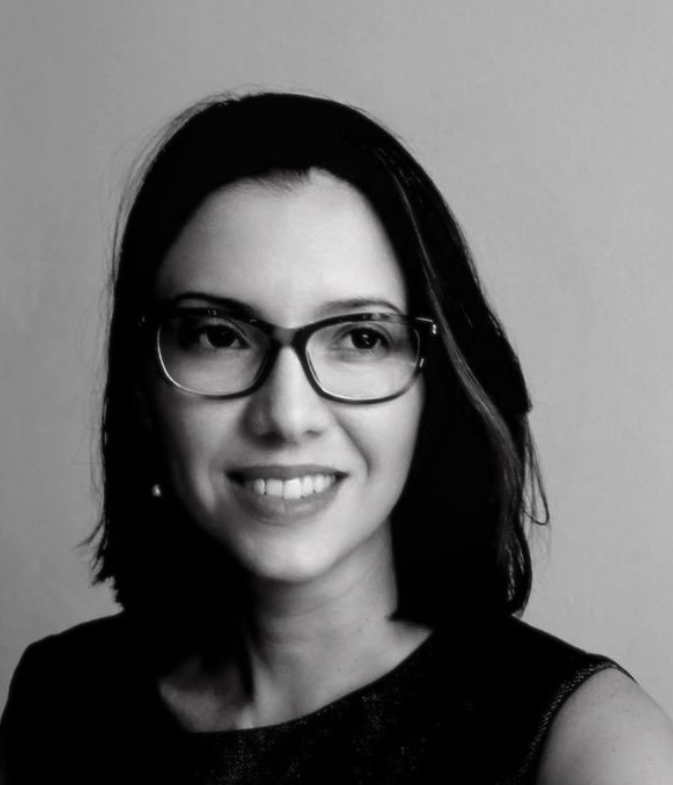
- Born: 1979 (age 46–47); Rio de Janeiro, Brazil
- Website: www.zazie.com.br

Laura Erber (Rio de Janeiro, 1979) is a Brazilian writer, artist, and researcher based in the Netherlands. She holds a Bachelor's degree in Literature from the Universidade do Estado do Rio de Janeiro (Rio de Janeiro State University – UERJ), as well as a Master's and Ph.D. in Literature from the Pontifícia Universidade Católica do Rio de Janeiro (Pontifical Catholic University of Rio de Janeiro – PUC-Rio). Her work renegotiates the relationships between different languages and mediums (drawing, film, photography, poetry, prose). In 2015, she founded Zazie Edições (Zazie Editions), an independent editorial platform focused on digital publications in Open Access format. Since 2022, she has directed the fellowships programme and international partnerships at the International Institute for Asian Studies – IIAS, Leiden University.

Between 2012 and 2019, she was an assistant professor in the Department of Theatre Theory at UNIRIO (Federal University of the State of Rio de Janeiro). She was a Visiting Professor at the University of Copenhagen, the Catholic University of Portugal, the Federal University of Minas Gerais, and at the Leiden University College. She currently lives and works in the Netherlands.

== Books ==
She is the author of Os corpos e os dias (The Bodies and the Days, Editora de Cultura, 2008 – finalist for the Jabuti Award in the Poetry category in 2009), Ghérasim Luca (EdUERJ, 2012), Esquilos de Pavlov (Pavlov's Squirrels, Alfaguara, 2013 – finalist for the Jabuti Award and the São Paulo Prize for Literature in the Novel category in 2014), A retornada (The Returnee, Relicário, 2017), O artista improdutivo (The Unproductive Artist, Âyiné, 2022), As palavras trocadas (The Swapped Words, Âyiné, 2023), Pequenos Fogos (Little Fires, Relicário, 2025), and Faltam Emojis (Missing Emojis, Círculo de Poemas, 2026). Her writing appears in prominent Brazilian and international literary outlets, such as: IMS Blog, Folha de S.Paulo, Revista Cult, Revista Serrote, Suplemento Pernambuco, ZUM, Words Without Borders, and is featured in the anthology "The Best of Young Brazilian Novelists" by the British magazine Granta (no. 121, 2012). Since 2014, she has also been creating books for children, such as: Bénédicte vê o mar (Bénédicte Sees the Sea, Zazie, 2011), Nadinha de nada (Nothing at All, Companhia das Letrinhas, 2016), O método de Pepe Chevette (Pepe Chevette's Method, Biruta, 2021), A Carta Perdida (The Missing Letter, Leiturinha, 2021) and Eu protesto! (I Protest!, GLAC, 2023).

== Arts ==
Her work has been exhibited in museums and art centers such as Centre Pompidou (France); IASPIS International Programme for Visual and Applied Arts (Sweden); Jeu de Paume (France); La Maison Européenne de la Photographie (France); Le Fonds Régional d’Art Contemporain Île-de-France (France); Moscow Museum of Modern Art (Russia); Centro Cultural Banco do Brasil (Brazil); Museu de Arte Moderna do Rio de Janeiro (Brazil); and Oi Futuro (Brazil). She was a fellow at the Akademie Schloss Solitude (Germany); Danish Arts Council (Denmark); Institute for Advanced Study at Central European University (Hungary); Le Fresnoy Studio National des Arts Contemporains (France); Proyecto Batiscafo - Triangle Network (Cuba); and Vlaanderen Pen Center (Antwerp). She has held solo exhibitions at the Centre International d’Art du Paysage Île de Vassivière (France); Fundació Miró (Barcelona); Grand Palais de Paris (France); Skive Ny Kunstmuseum (Denmark); Centro Cultural Banco do Brasil (Brazil); Galeria Novembro de Arte Contemporânea (Brazil); and Museu de Arte Moderna do Rio de Janeiro (Brazil). Starting in 2015, Erber began dedicating herself more to literature, while prioritizing drawing.
