= Josef Erber (naturalist) =

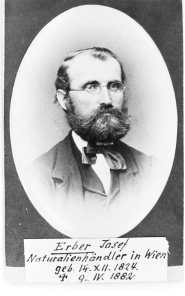
Josef Erber

Josef Erber was a natural history dealer in Vienna. He made expeditions to the Greek Islands.

== Selected works ==
- 1856 Beobachtungen über Zamenis aesculapii Wgl. Verh.zool.-bot.Ges.Wien 6 :393- 396
- 1857 Weitere Beobachtungen über Zamenis Aesculapii Verh.zool.-bot.Ges.Wien 7:47- 48
- 1863 Beobachtungen an Amphibien in der Gefangenschaft Verh.zool.-bot.Ges.Wien 13:129- 132
- 1864 Beiträge zur Lebensweise der Tarantel Verh.zool.-bot.Ges.Wien 14:717- 720
- 1864 Die Amphibien der österr. Monarchie Verh.zool.-bot.Ges.Wien 14 :
- 1865) Ueber die auf der Seestrandskiefer: Pinus halepensis Mich. lebenden schädlichen Insekten. (Seitenzahl Angabe korrekt, im Buch falsch papiniert) Verh.zool.-bot.Ges.Wien 15 : 943- 946
- 1867 Bemerkungen zu meiner Reise nach den griechischen Inseln. Verh. Zool.-Bot. Ges. Wien; 17: 853-856.
- 1868. Bericht über eine Reise nach Rhodus. Verhandl. Zool. (Bot.) Ges. Wien. 18:903-908.
