= Phytogenics =

Phytogenics are a group of natural growth promoters or non-antibiotic growth promoters used as feed additives, derived from herbs, spices or other plants. The term phytogenic feed additives was coined by an Austrian multinational feed additives company named Delacon, and was first introduced to the market in the 1980s.

Essential oils represent a concentrated form of phytogenics, containing mainly the active ingredients of the plants. The spectrum of phytogenic feed additives is vast and does not only consist of essential oils, but also includes other active ingredient groups, such as pungent substances, bitter substances, saponins, flavonoids, mucilages and tannins. Phytogenic feed additives, known as PFAs or botanicals, are substances of plant origin added to animal diets at recommended levels with the aim of improving animal nutrition and growth. The potential of phytogenic feed additives to promote growth in young piglets and poultry is under preliminary research.

== Modes of action ==
=== Effect on growth rates ===
Compounds such as caraway oil, lemon oil, and dried herbs and spices, may improve the growth rate of certain animals. Phytogenic feed additives can substitute for antibiotic growth promoters in poultry diets.

=== Effect on ammonia emissions ===
Certain compounds, such as saponins, have shown potential to reduce ammonia emissions of animals by inhibiting urease activity that converts urea in ammonia and carbon dioxide.

=== Quorum sensing inhibitory effects ===
Phytogenics have been shown to interfere with bacterial quorum sensing and thus have the potential to reduce virulence of certain bacterial pathogens. Quorum sensing inhibition is used as a possible method to treat bacterial disorders in farm animals.

== Registration ==
According to Art. 6, Reg. EC 1831/2003, a zootechnical feed additive is defined as “any additive used to affect favourably the performance of animals in good health or used to affect favourably the environment”. In the European Union, all phytogenic products must pass the authorization process as feed additive, if efficacy claims are used. The requirements concerning safety issues are mandatory for all additives, whereas the scope of application differs, and is reflected by the feed additive categories.

Unlike most botanical feed additives, which are considered as sensory additives (flavors), Delacon obtained zootechnical registrations for its main phytogenic products in the pig and poultry feed sector in 2012 and 2017, covering both digestibility and performance parameters.

In order to obtain the registration as a zootechnical feed additive, a dossier of complete, comprehensive and validated data on the quality, safety and efficacy of the feed additive must be submitted to the European Commission. The Commission mandates the European Reference Laboratory (EURL) and the European Food Safety Authority (EFSA) to carry out a detailed evaluation of the dossier. The EURL then analyses and evaluates relevant parameters of the samples, methods and traceability of the additive in the feed chain (additive-premixture-feed). The full evaluation report has to be submitted to the EFSA. After the order of the European Commission, EFSA issues a scientific opinion to the European Commission, the Member States and the applicant on the safety and efficacy of the additive. This opinion demonstrates whether the feed additive has the potential to meet these requirements and whether it is safe for the target animals, workers, consumers and the environment. Following this intensive evaluation, EFSA formulates a scientific opinion which serves as the basis for the final decision and approval by the European Commission in concordance with the Member States.
