= Inzersdorf-Getzersdorf =

- Municipality
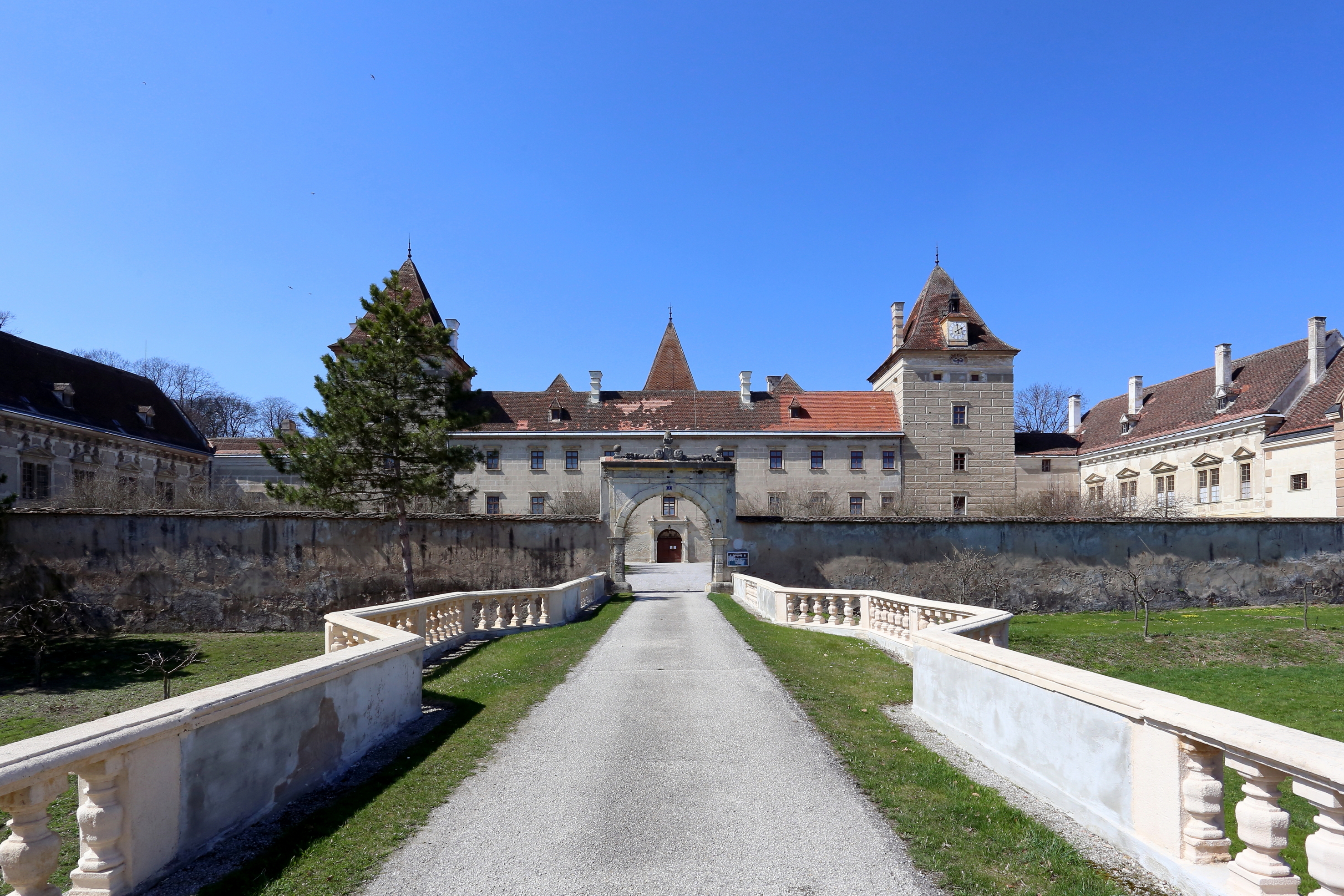
- Walpersdorf Castle in Inzersdorf-Getzersdorf

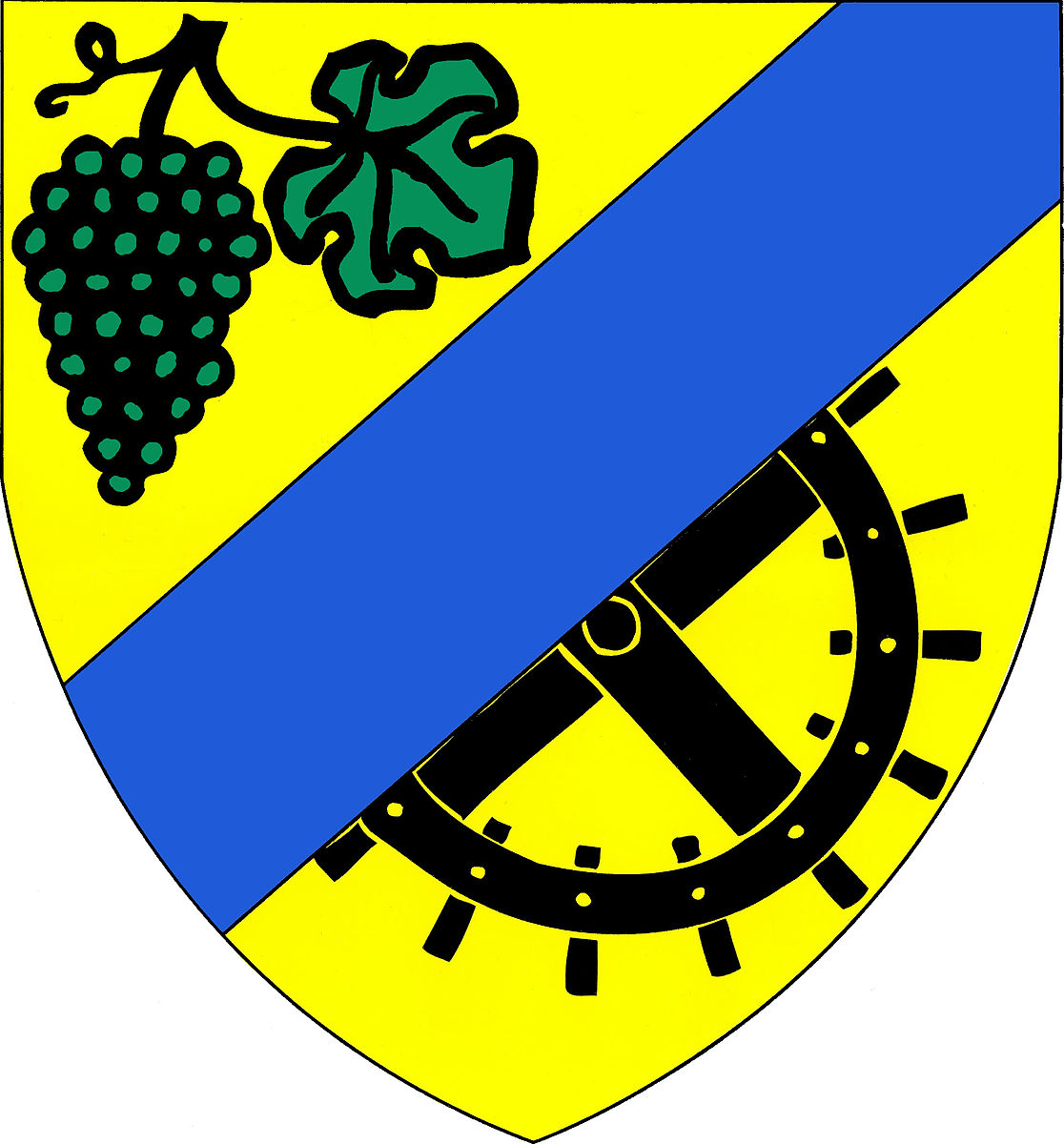
- Coat of arms

- Location within Austria
- Coordinates: 48°19′N 15°40′E
- Country: Austria
- State: Lower Austria
- District: Sankt Pölten-Land

Government
  - Mayor: Mag. Ewald Gorth

Area
  - Total: 13.63 km^{2} (5.26 sq mi)
- Elevation: 260 m (850 ft)

Population (2018-01-01)
  - Total: 1,581
  - Density: 116.0/km^{2} (300.4/sq mi)
- Time zone: UTC+1 (CET)
  - Summer (DST): UTC+2 (CEST)
- Postal code: 3130
- Area code: 02782
- Website: http://www.inzersdorf-getzersdorf.gv.at

Inzersdorf-Getzersdorf is a town in the district of Sankt Pölten-Land in the Austrian state of Lower Austria.

== Population ==
Historical population
Year	Pop.	±%
1971	1,143	—
1981	1,133	−0.9%
1991	1,335	+17.8%
2001	1,399	+4.8%
